= Tethart Philipp Christian Haag =

Dutch painter (1737–1812)

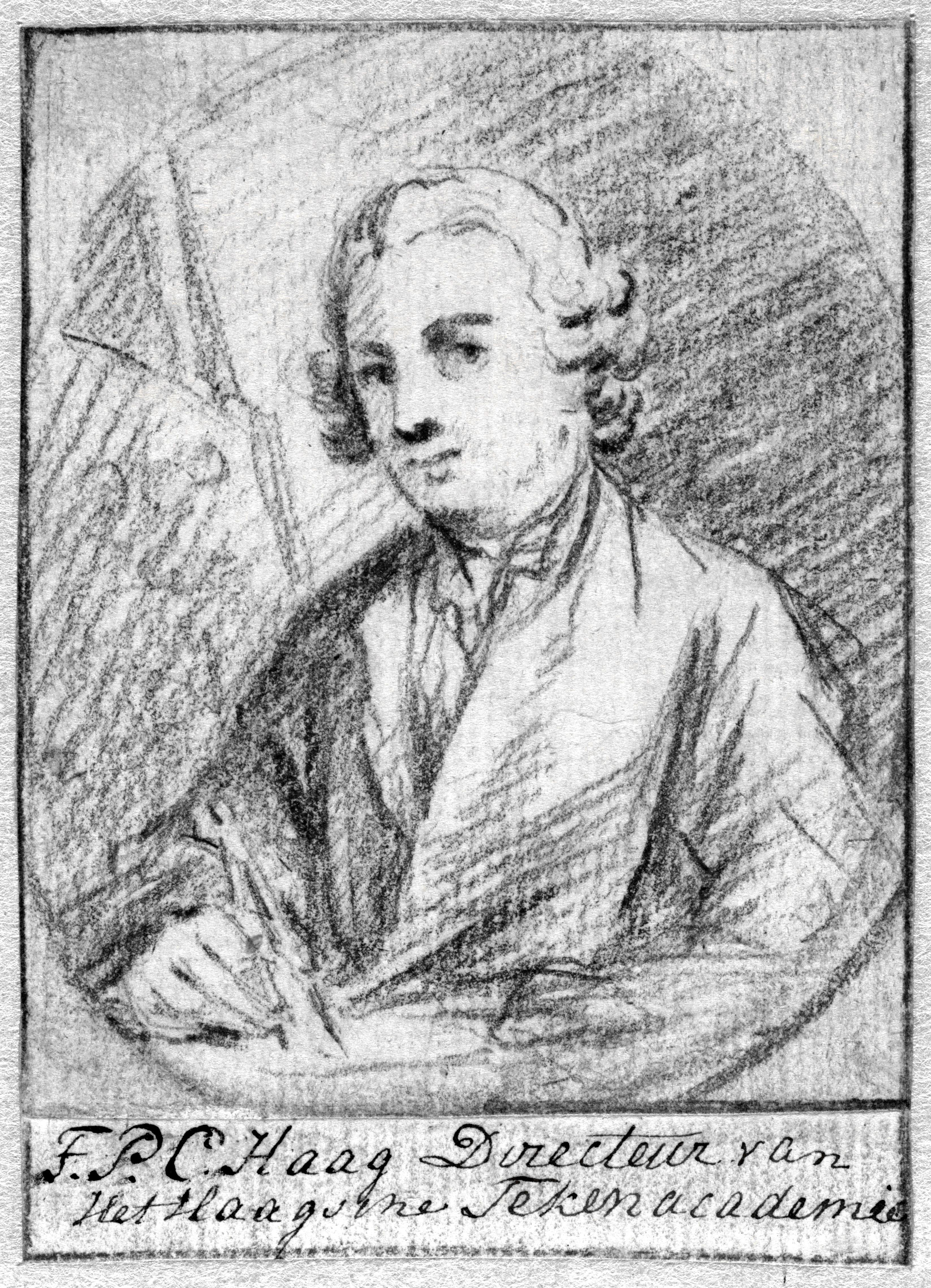
Tethart Philipp Christian Haag, self-portrait

Tethart Philipp Christian Haag (22 May 1737 – 23 August 1812) was a Dutch artist and court painter to William V of Orange-Nassau and the director of cultural institutions in The Hague.

== Biography ==
=== Youth ===
Tethart Haag was born in Kassel. He was the son of Johann David Christian Haag, who took him in 1747 to the Netherlands when he was employed there as court painter to Stadhouderlijk Hof in Leeuwarden. When Prince William IV was elevated to stadtholder in 1747 and moved to The Hague, Johann took his son with him to move there. Tethart was taught by his father in painting and in 1756 joined a painting society in The Hague called the Confrerie Pictura, where he registered in 1760 as a portrait and horse painter.

=== Court Painter ===
In 1760, Tethart followed his deceased father as court painter to Stadtholder Prince William V. In that capacity he made an inventory of the paintings in the governor's court between 1763 and 1764. From Haag, alongside portraits of the governor, several other works depicted: stable interiors and driving schools, portraits of horses with or without driver and portraits of prominent people, often depicted on horseback. A remarkable work of Haag is his painting of Wilhelmina of Prussia, Princess of Orange on a horse, which hangs in the Rijksmuseum in Amsterdam. Contrary to tradition he did not picture her sitting with both legs on one side, but in the male position, which was customary for kings and emperors. Tethart Haag gave painting lessons to the princess. He also made drawings of paintings by famous masters, including The Young Bull by Paulus Potter. Haag also worked as an engraver and etcher.

=== Prince William V Gallery ===
As court painter to Prince William V, Haag also managed the collection of paintings by the governor and was his chief adviser in the foundation in 1774 of a stadtholder 'Picture Gallery' at the Buitenhof in The Hague. He was thus the first director and curator of this first public museum in the Netherlands, which would later be known as the Prince William V Gallery. His salary amounted to 200 guilders in 1783. However, he had access to a service property located on the first floor of the picture gallery on the Buitenhof.

=== Director of Cultural Institutions ===
In addition to his work for the governor's court and as an artist, Haag held various posts at cultural institutions in The Hague. He was chief (since 1762) of the Hague guild Confrerie Pictura and in 1788 he was appointed dean. He was also director of the Hague Academy of Drawing.

He died in 1812 in The Hague.

== Gallery ==
Tethart Philipp Christian Haag's paintings

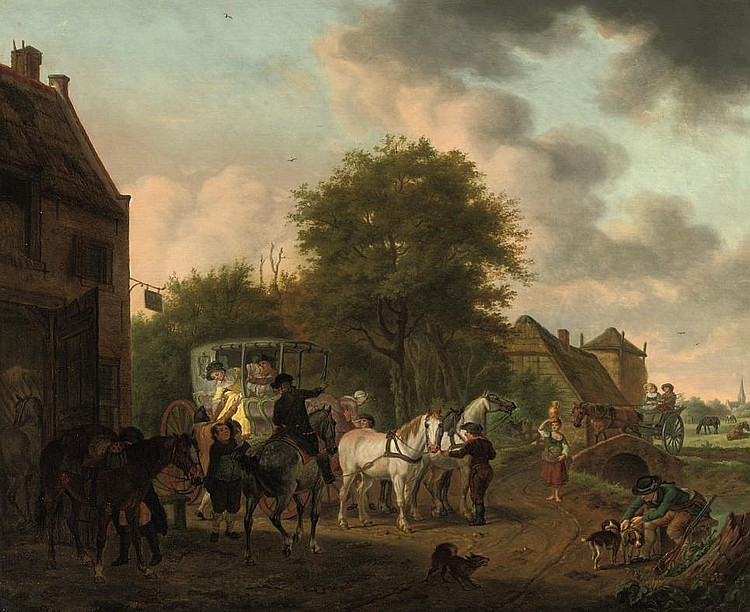
Elegant party in a carriage stop in a village

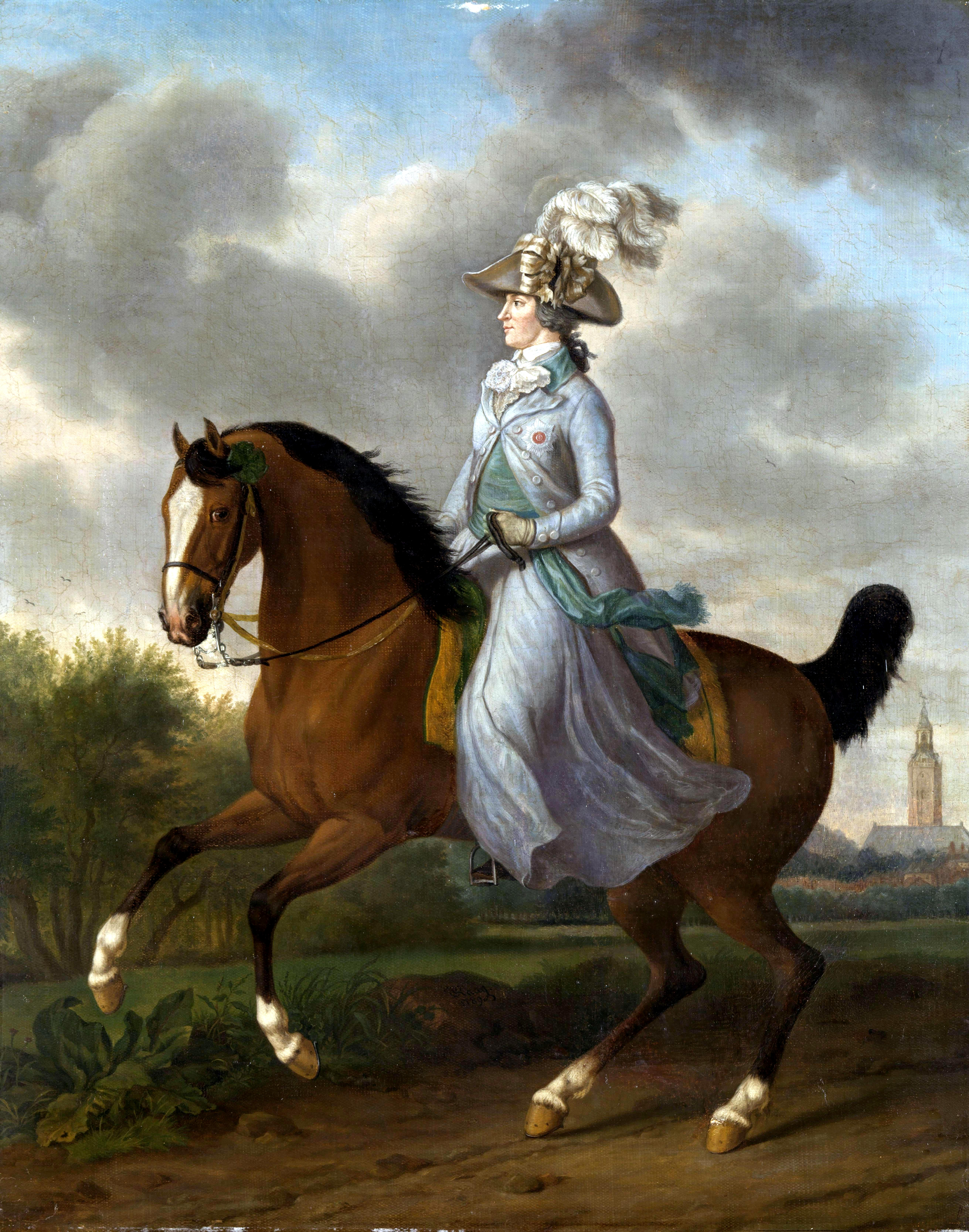
Portrait of Wilhelmina of Prussia, Princess of Orange

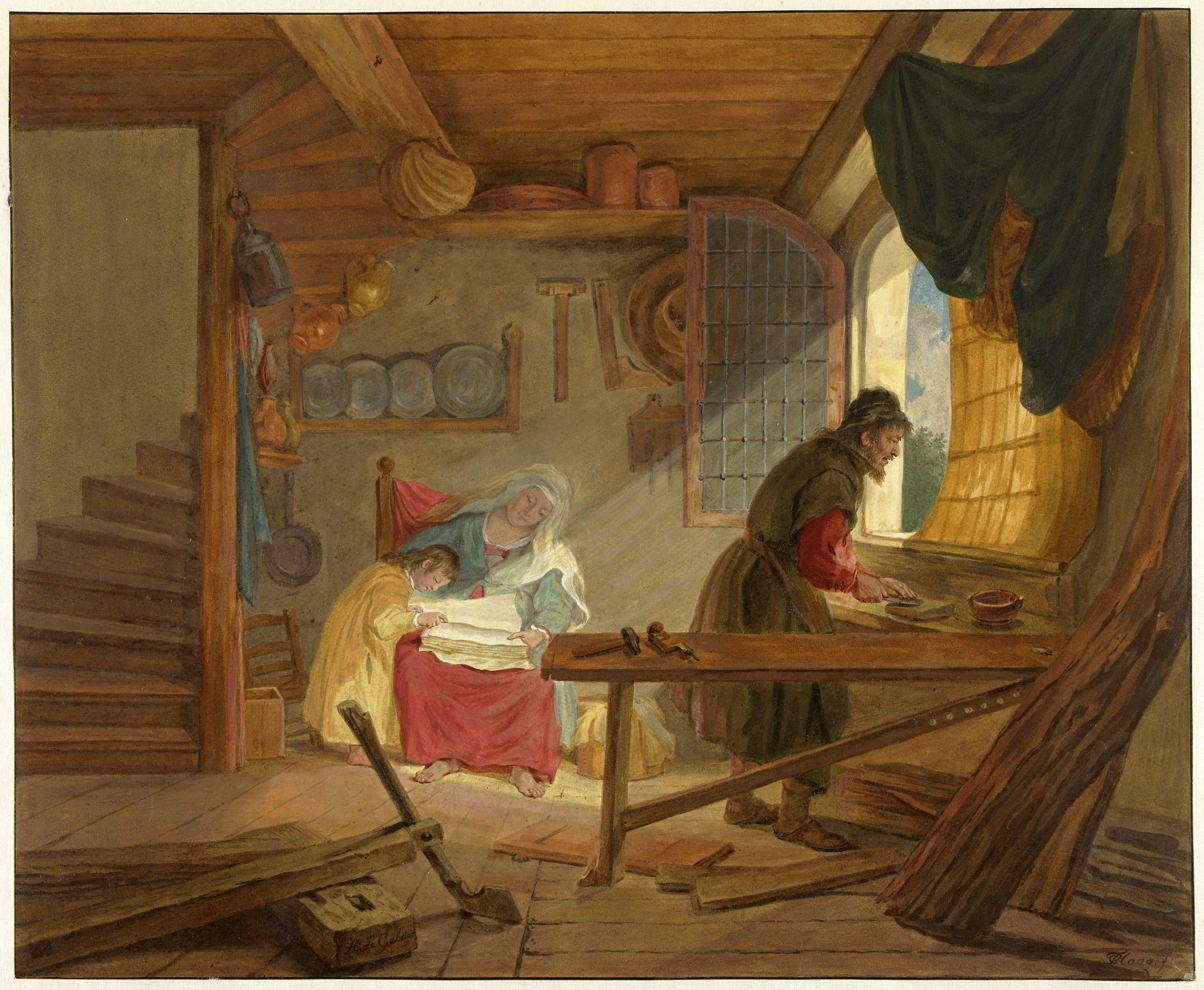
The Holy Family in Josef's workshop, between 1747 and 1812

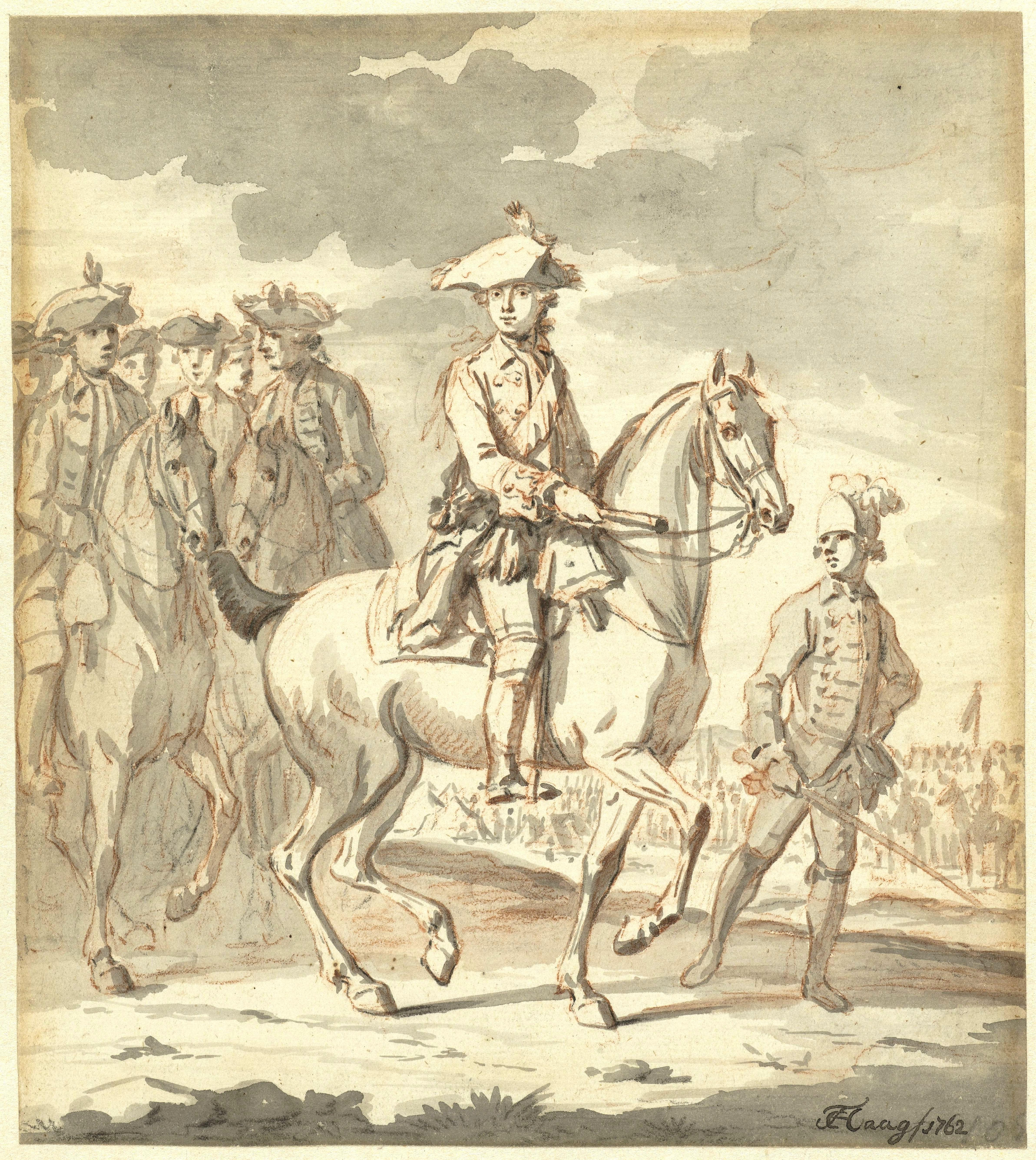
The young Prince William V on horseback.

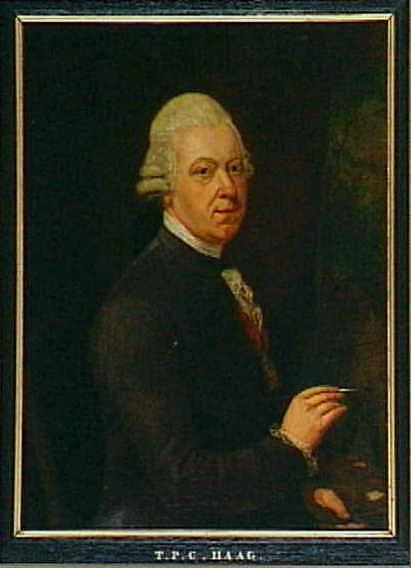
Self Portrait Tethart Hague from 1777

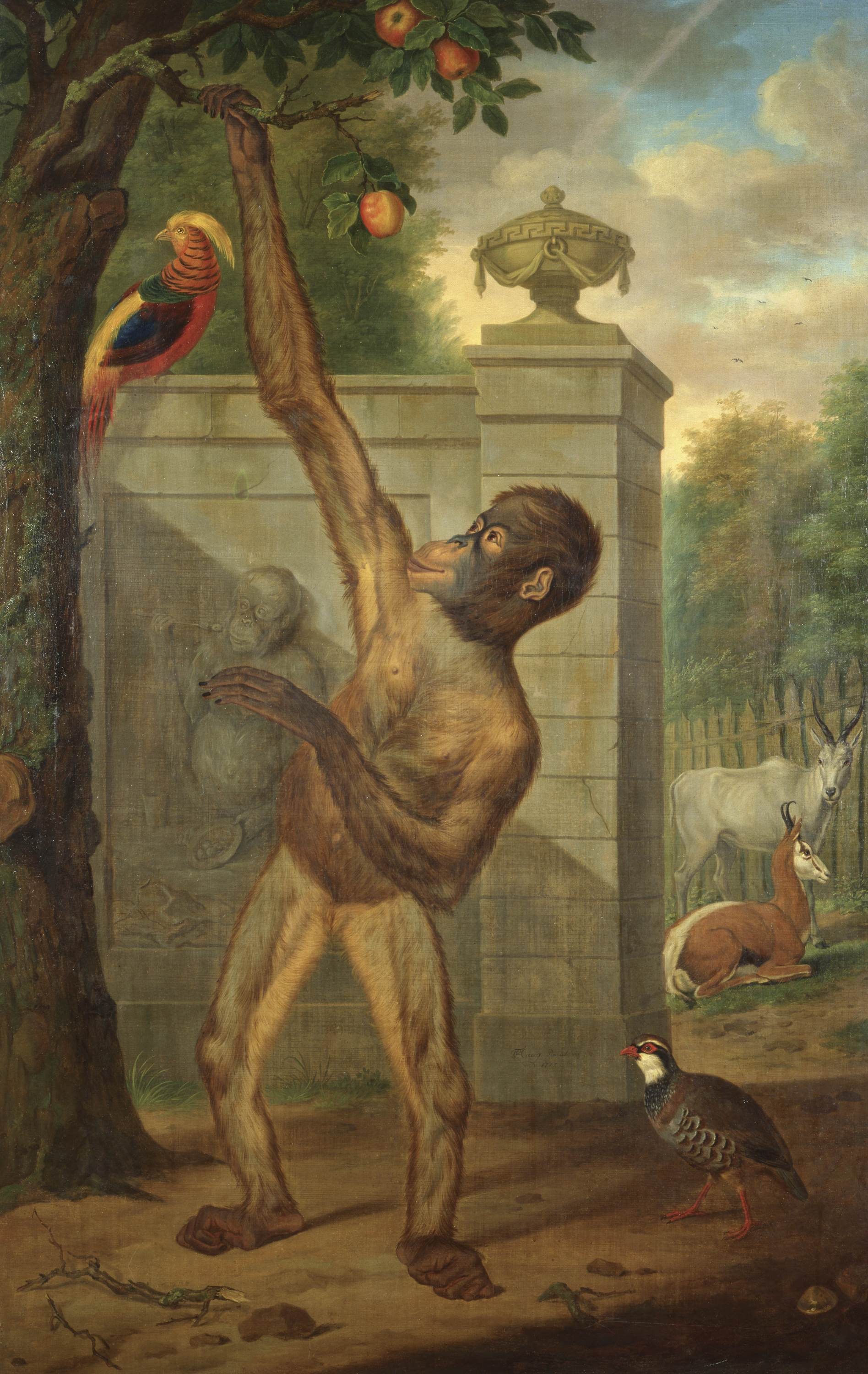
Orangutan in the zoo of William V, picking an apple

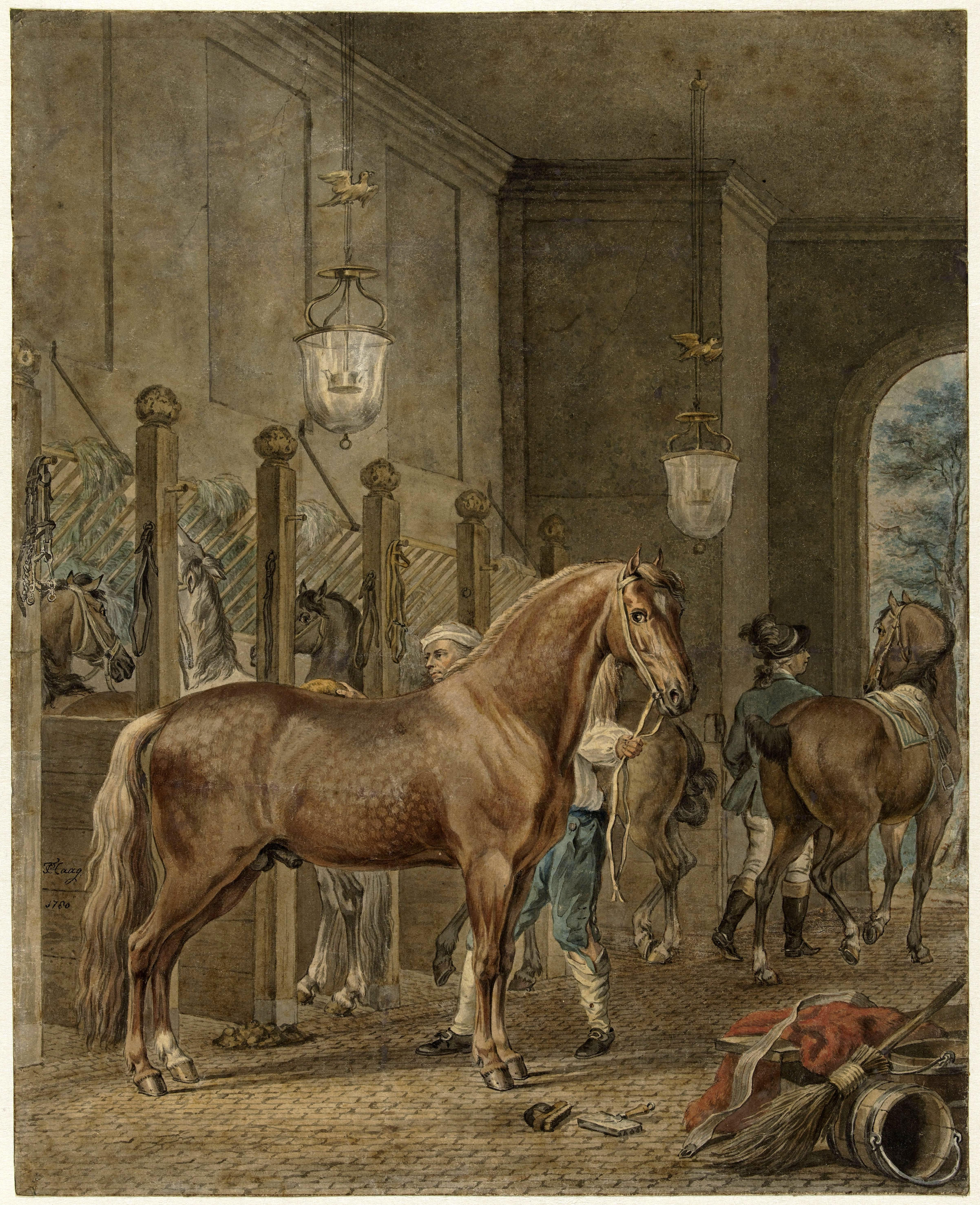
Stable with horses

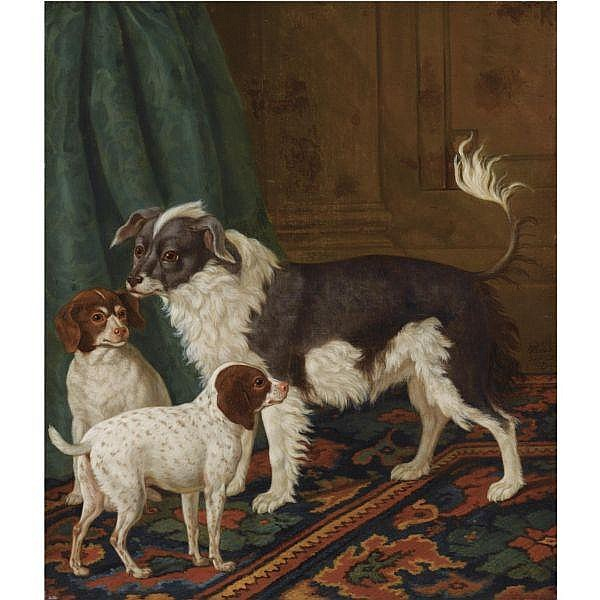
Dog and two puppies in an interior, 1792

== Sources ==
- Haag, Tethart Philipp Christian at the Netherlands Institute for Art History
