= Flower Still life with a watch =

1663 painting by Willem van Aelst

Flower still life with a watch
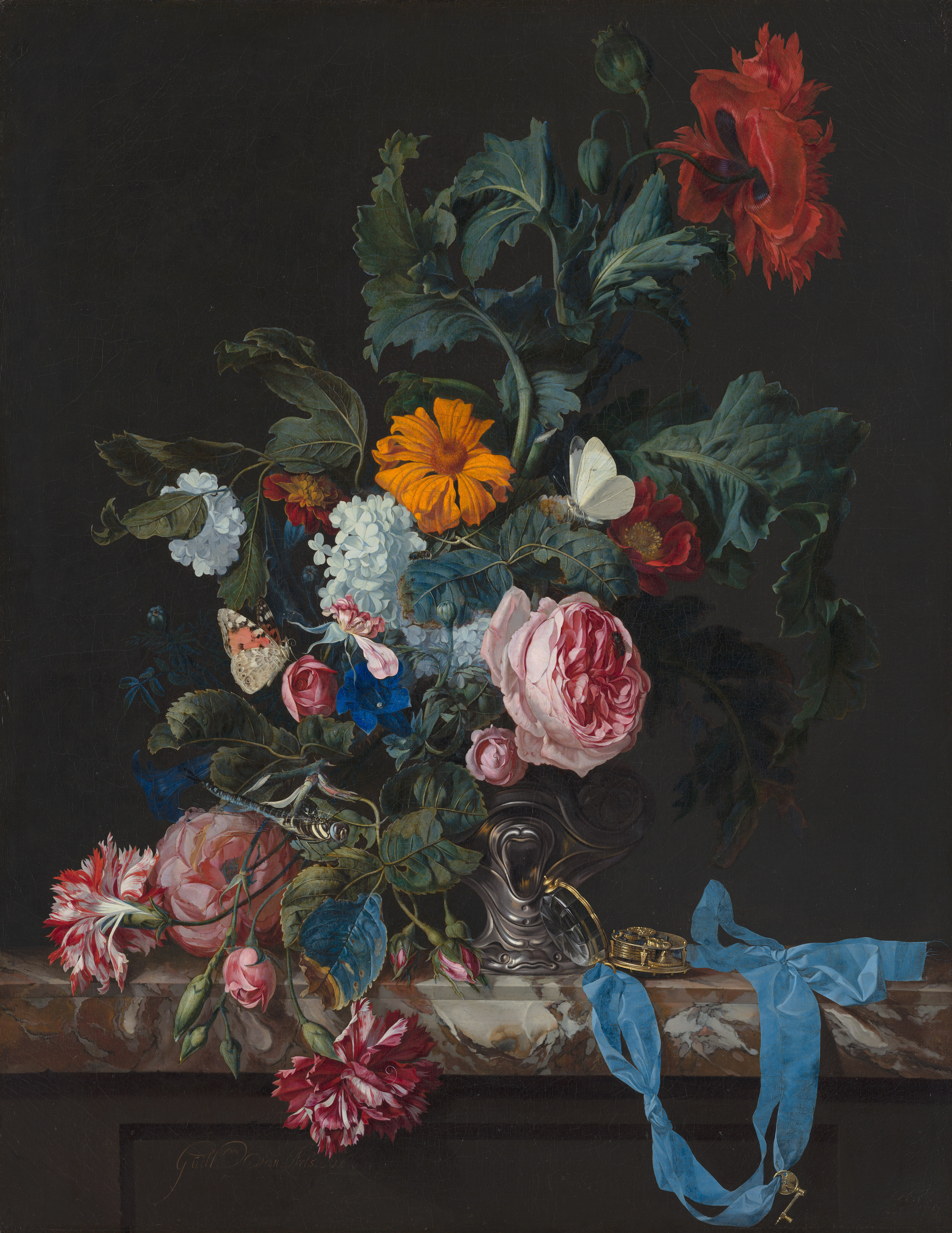
- Artist: Willem van Aelst
- Year: 1663
- Medium: oil paint, canvas
- Dimensions: 62.5 cm (24.6 in) × 49 cm (19 in)
- Location: Mauritshuis, Het Loo Palace
- Accession: 2

Flower still life with a watch is a 1663 floral painting by Willem van Aelst. It is in the collection of the Mauritshuis and exhibited at the Gallery Prince Willem V.

== Early history and creation ==
This work was painted in Amsterdam where it was signed and dated Guill.mo van Aelst. 1663. Van Aelst had recently returned from Italy and thus signed as "Guillelmo" rather than Willem. He remained in Amsterdam until his death and was a strong influence on other Amsterdam flower painters, including Rachel Ruysch.

== Description and interpretation ==
Displayed in frame at Mauritshuis

The work shows a watch with a blue ribbon attached. It is not clear which watchmaker designed it. The bouquet shows Rosa gallica, poppy, Pieris, Myosotis, Gentiana, Viburnum opulus, Tagetes lucida, Tagetes patula, butterfly, Southern Hawker, and Calliphoridae. The vase itself is an object created by Johannes Lutma in the auricular style.

The painting follows in a tradition of Dutch and Flemish flower still life paintings showing a pocket watch attached to a blue ribbon with a wind-up key. This is one of many recurring symbols of the Vanitas genre that Van Aelst and others used:

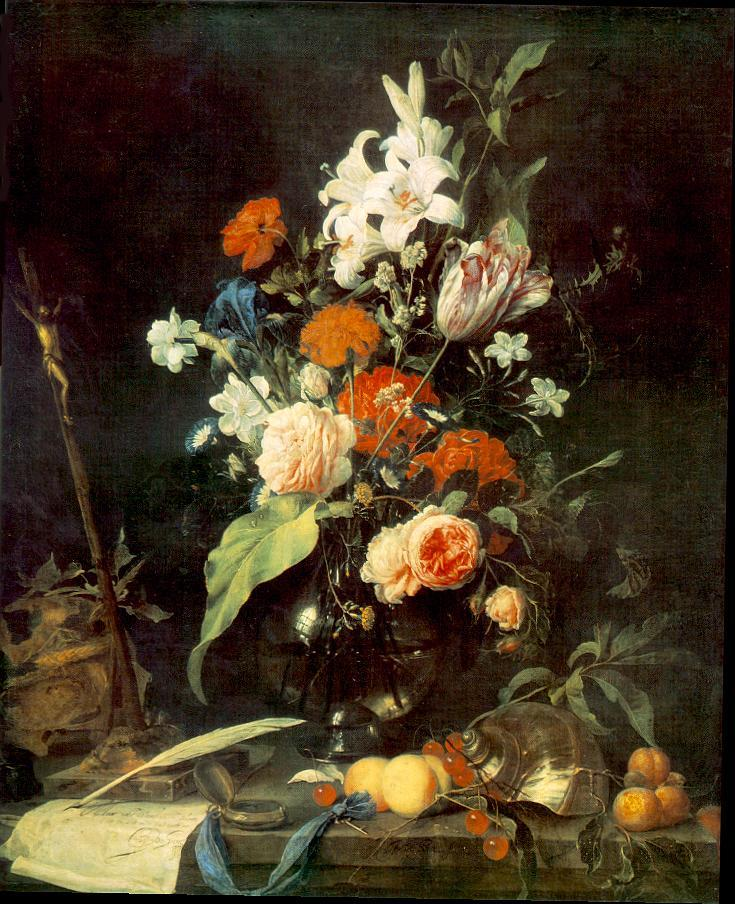
Jan Davidsz de Heem, 1630s

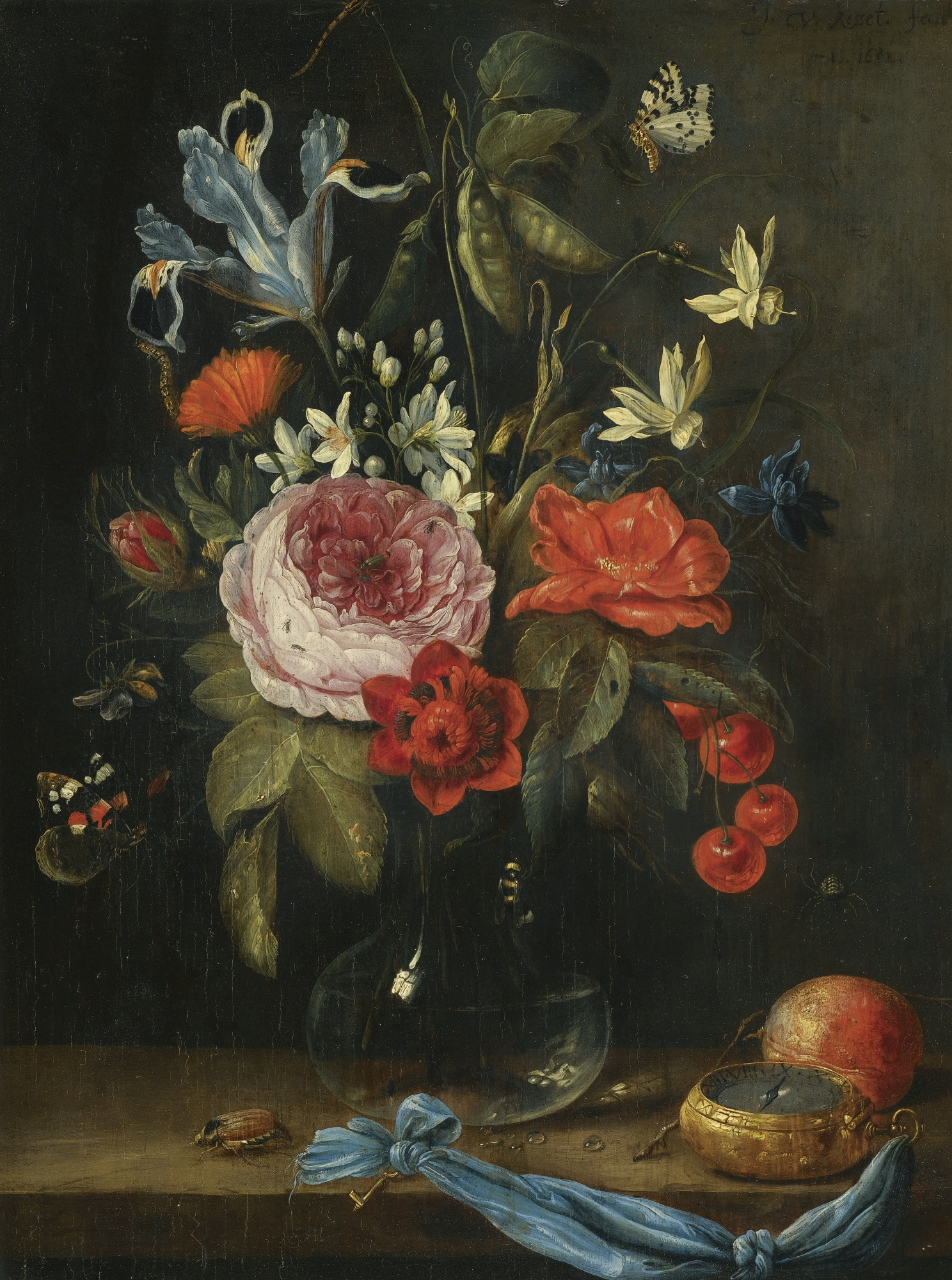
Jan van Kessel the elder, 1652

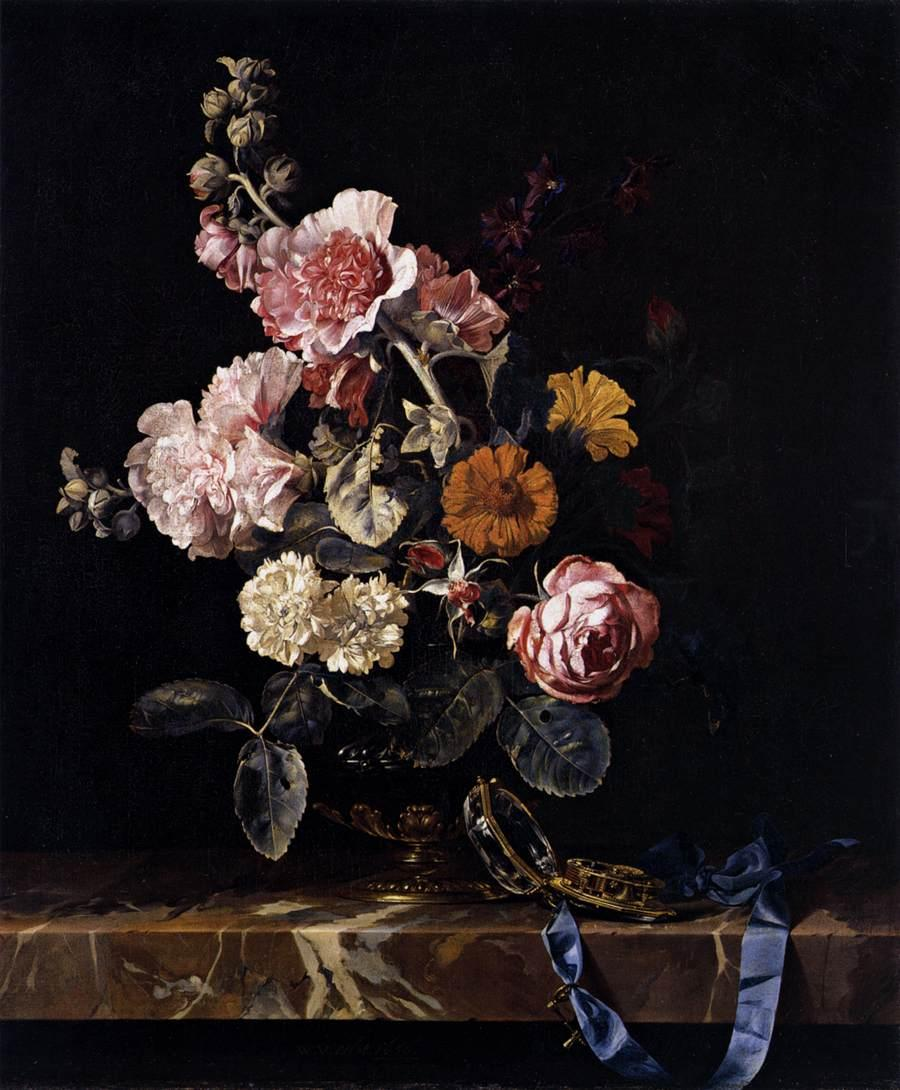
Willem van Aelst, 1656

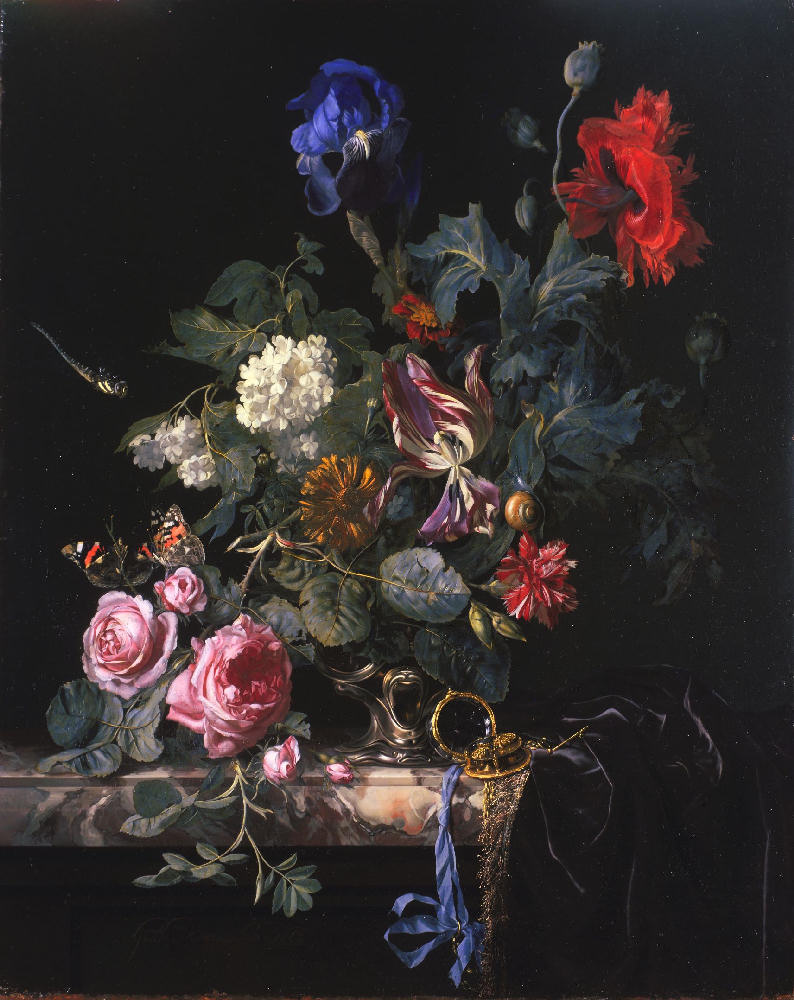
Willem van Aelst, 1663

== Later history and influence ==
The painting is one of many from the Dutch Royal collection at Het Loo Palace, Apeldoorn. It is registered there as early as 1757. William V, Prince of Orange took it to The Hague for his new 1774 gallery. It was in the gallery when its contents were taken to Paris as war booty during the French occupation. It was on show in the Louvre from 1795 until 1815, whereupon it was returned.
