= Hierarchy of genres =

Ranks of different genres in an art form in terms of their prestige and cultural value

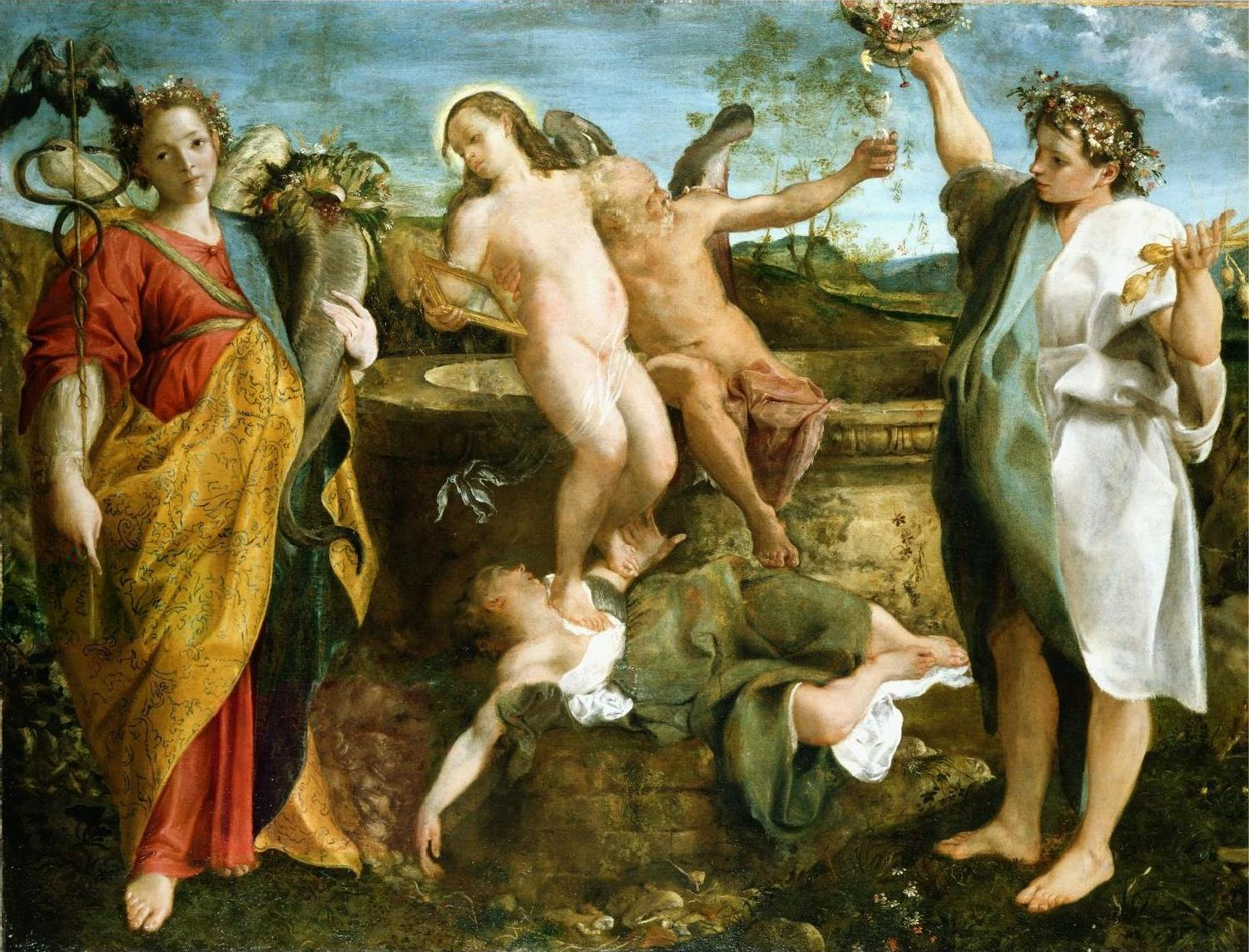
Annibale Carracci, An Allegory of Truth and Time (1584–85), an allegorical history painting relying very little upon realism.

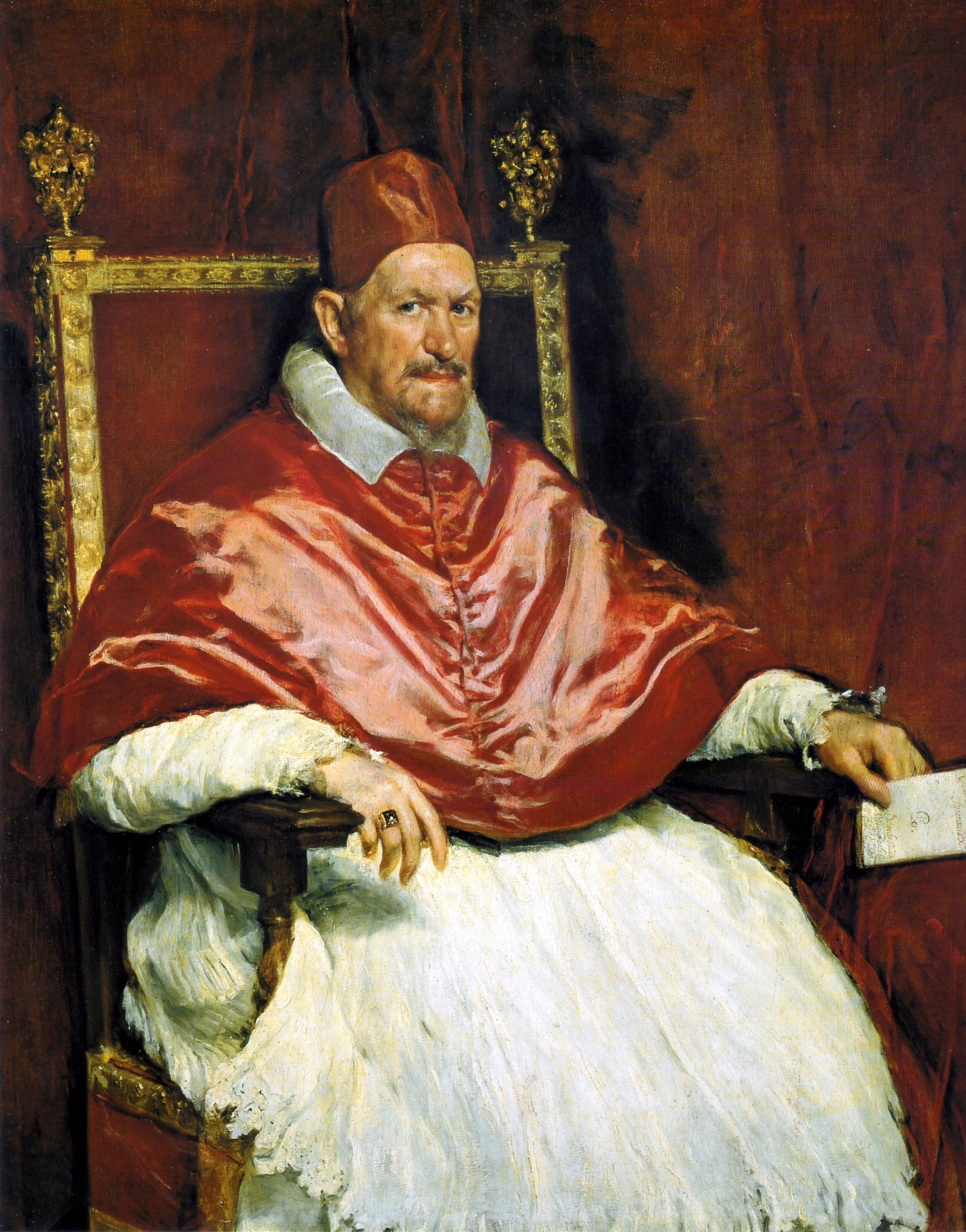
Velázquez, portrait painting of Pope Innocent X, c. 1650

A hierarchy of genres is any formalization which ranks different genres in an art form in terms of their social prestige and cultural value.

In literature, the epic was considered the highest form, for the reason expressed by Samuel Johnson in his Life of John Milton: "By the general consent of criticks, the first praise of genius is due to the writer of an epick poem, as it requires an assemblage of all the powers which are singly sufficient for other compositions." Below that came lyric poetry, and comic poetry, with a similar ranking for drama. The novel took a long time to establish a firm place in the hierarchy, doing so only as belief in any systematic hierarchy of forms expired in the 19th century.

In music, lyrical settings of words were accorded a higher status than merely instrumental works, at least until the Baroque period, and opera retained a superior status for much longer. The status of works also varies with the number of players and singers involved, with those written for large forces, which are certainly more difficult to write and more expensive to perform, given higher status. Any element of comedy reduced the status of a work, though, as in other art forms, often increased its popularity.

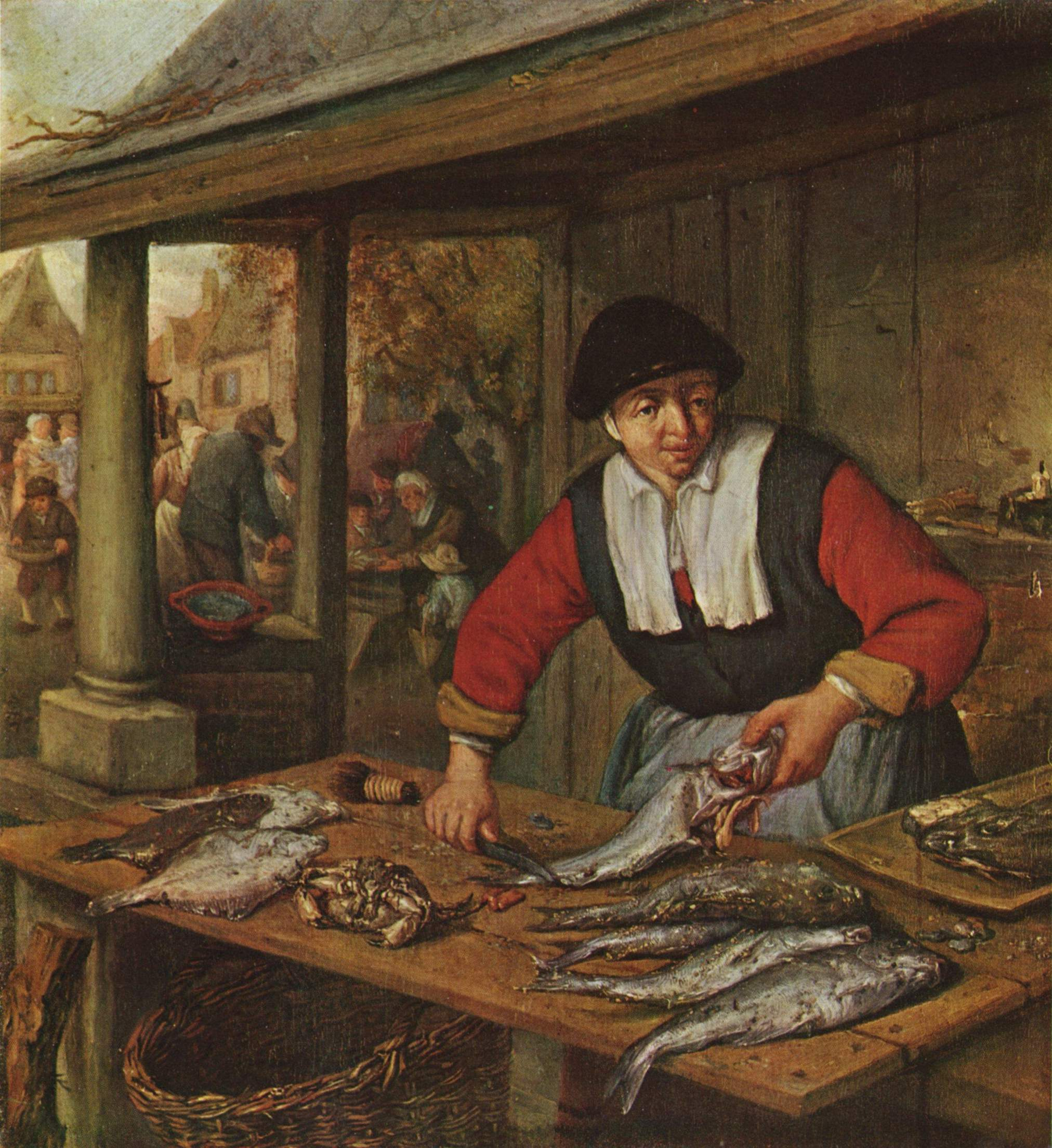
A genre painting. Adriaen van Ostade, Fishmonger, 1660–1670, oil on oak, 29 × 26.5 cm, Museum of Fine Arts, Budapest.

The hierarchies in figurative art are those initially formulated for painting in 16th-century Italy, which held sway with little alteration until the early 19th century. These were formalized and promoted by the academies in Europe between the 17th century and the modern era, of which the most influential became the French Académie de peinture et de sculpture, which held a central role in Academic art. The fully developed hierarchy distinguished between:

- History painting, including historically important, religious, mythological, or allegorical subjects
- Portrait painting
- Genre painting or scenes of everyday life
- Landscape and cityscape art (landscapists were called "common footmen in the Army of Art" by the Dutch theorist Samuel van Hoogstraten)
- Animal painting
- Still life

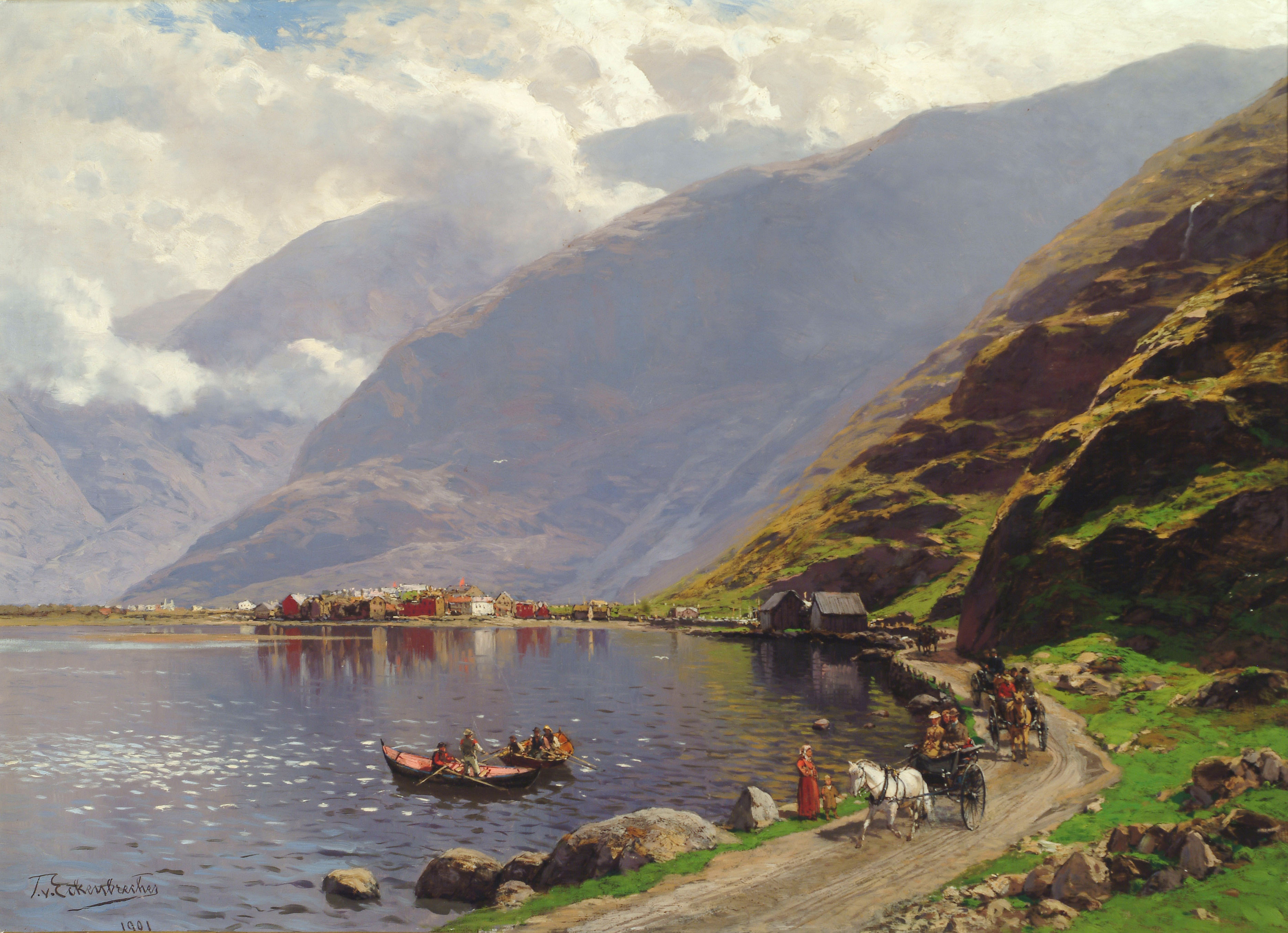
A landscape. Themistokles von Eckenbrecher, View of Laerdalsoren, on the Sognefjord, oil on canvas, 1901.

The hierarchy was based on a distinction between art that made an intellectual effort to "render visible the universal essence of things" (imitare in Italian) and that which merely consisted of "mechanical copying of particular appearances" (ritrarre). Idealism was privileged over realism in line with Renaissance Neo-Platonist philosophy.

The term is mostly used within the field of painting, and from the High Renaissance onwards, by which time painting had asserted itself as the highest form of art. This had not been the case in Medieval art and the art-commissioning sectors of society took a considerable period to fully accept this view. The Raphael Cartoons are a clear example of the continuing status of tapestry, the most expensive form of art in the 16th century. In the Early Medieval period, lavish pieces of metalwork had typically been the most highly regarded, and valuable materials remained an important ingredient in the appreciation of art until at least the 17th century. Until the 19th century, the most extravagant objets d'art remained more expensive, both new and on the art market, than all but a few paintings. Classical writings which valued the supreme skills of individual artists were influential, as well as developments in art which allowed the Renaissance artist to demonstrate their skill and invention to a greater degree than was usually possible in the Middle Ages.

== Renaissance art ==
The hierarchy grew out of the struggle to gain acceptance of painting as one of the liberal arts, and then controversies to establish an equal or superior status within them with architecture and sculpture. These matters were considered of great importance by artist-theorists such as Leon Battista Alberti, Leonardo da Vinci, and Giorgio Vasari. Against the sculptors, Leonardo argued that the intellectual effort necessary to create an illusion of three-dimensionality made the painters' art superior to that of the sculptor, who could do so merely by recording appearances. In his De Pictura ("About Painting") of 1441, Alberti argued that multi-figure history painting was the noblest form of art, as being the most difficult, which required mastery of all the others, because it was a visual form of history, and because it had the greatest potential to move the viewer. He placed emphasis on the ability to depict the interactions between the figures by gesture and expression.

Theorists of the Early and High Renaissance accepted the importance of representing nature closely, at least until the later writings of Michelangelo, who was strongly influenced by neoplatonism. By the time of Mannerist theorists such as Gian Paolo Lomazzo and Federico Zuccari (both also painters) this was far less of a priority. Both emphasized beauty as "something which was directly infused into the mind of man from the mind of God, and existed there independent of any sense-impressions", a view bound to further reduce the status of works depending on realism. In practice the hierarchy represented little break with either medieval and classical thought, except to place secular history painting in the same class as religious art, and to distinguish (not always clearly) between static iconic religious subjects and narrative figure scenes, giving the latter a higher status. Ideas of decorum also fed into the hierarchy; comic, sordid or merely frivolous subjects or treatment ranked lower than elevated and moral ones.

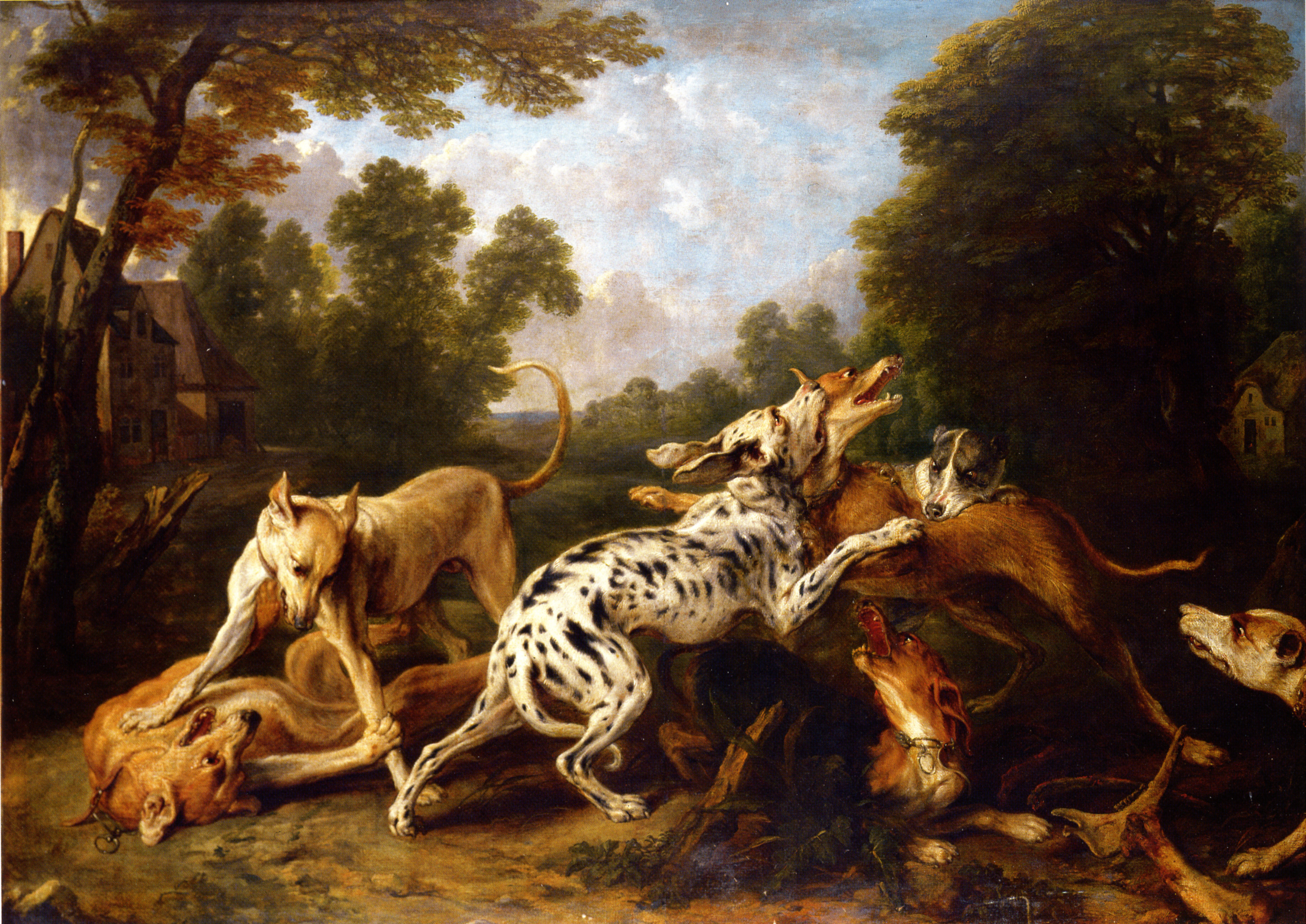
Animal painting by Frans Snyders, Dogs fighting in a wooded clearing

During the Renaissance landscape, genre scenes and still lifes hardly existed as established genres, so discussion of the status or importance of different types of painting was mainly concerned with history subjects as against portraits, initially small and unpretentious, and iconic portrait-type religious and mythological subjects. For most artists some commitment to realism was necessary in a portrait; few could take the high-handed approach of Michelangelo, who largely ignored the actual appearance of the Medici in his Medici Chapel sculptures, supposedly saying that in a thousand years no one would know the difference (a retort Gainsborough is also said to have used, with a shorter timeframe).

Many portraits were extremely flattering, which could be justified by an appeal to idealism as well as the sitter's vanity; the theorist Armenini claimed in 1587 that "portraits by excellent artists are considered to be painted with better style [maniera] and greater perfection than others, but more often than not they are less good likenesses". On the other hand, numbers of courtly sitters and their parents, suitors or courtiers complained that painters entirely failed to do justice to the reality of the sitter.

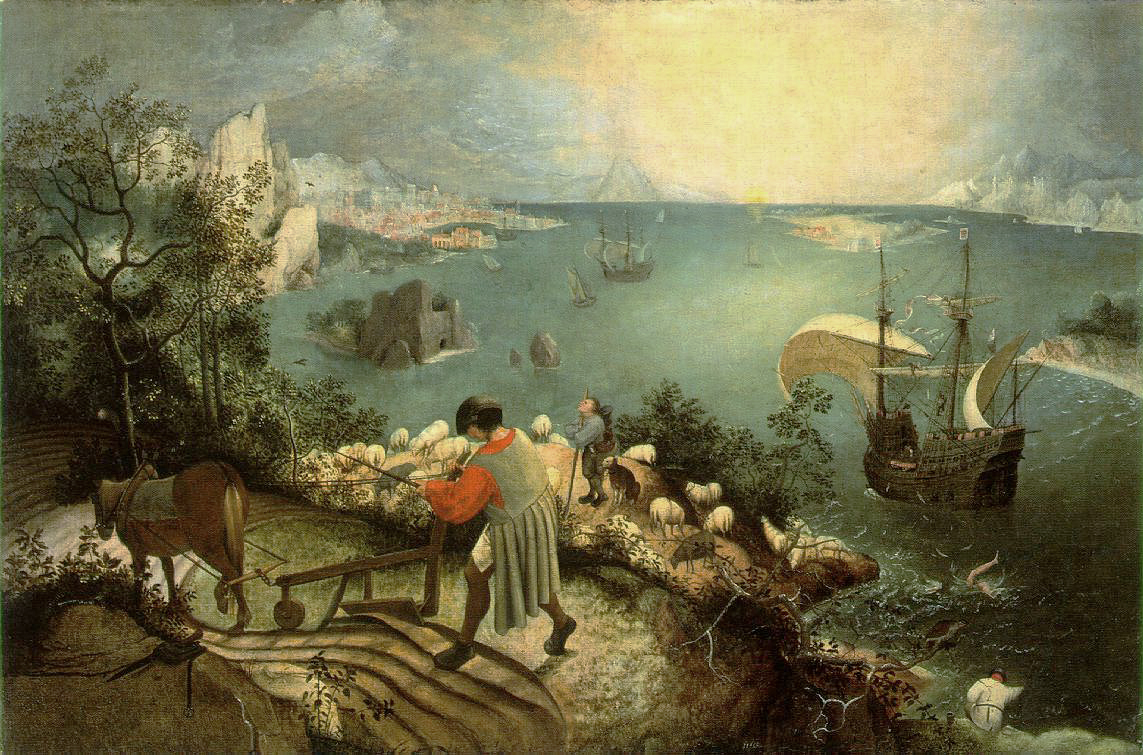
Landscape with the Fall of Icarus, c. 1560 after Pieter Bruegel, an original treatment of a history subject dominated by a genre figure.

The question of decorum in religious art became the focus of intense effort by the Catholic Church after the decrees on art of the Council of Trent of 1563. Paintings depicting biblical events as if they were occurring in the households of wealthy contemporary Italians were attacked, and soon ceased. Until the challenge of Caravaggio at the end of the century, religious art became thoroughly ideal.

== 17th and 18th century art ==
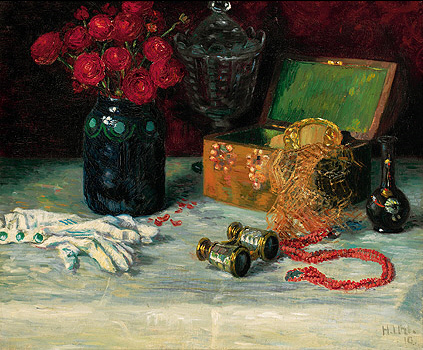
A still life. Heinrich Uhl, Still life with Jewelry Box, Opera Glasses, Gloves, and Bouquet of Flowers, oil on canvas, 50 x 60 cm.

The new genres of landscape, genre painting, animal painting and still life came into their own in the 17th century, with the virtual cessation of religious painting in Protestant countries, and the expansion of picture buying to the prosperous middle class. Although similar developments occurred in all advanced European countries, they were most evident in the enormously productive schools of Dutch Golden Age painting and Flemish Baroque painting. However no theorists emerged to champion the new genres, and the relatively small amount of Dutch theoretical writing, by Karel van Mander, Samuel Dirksz van Hoogstraten, Gerard de Lairesse and others, was mostly content to rehash Italian views, so that their writings can seem oddly at variance with the Dutch art actually being produced in their day.

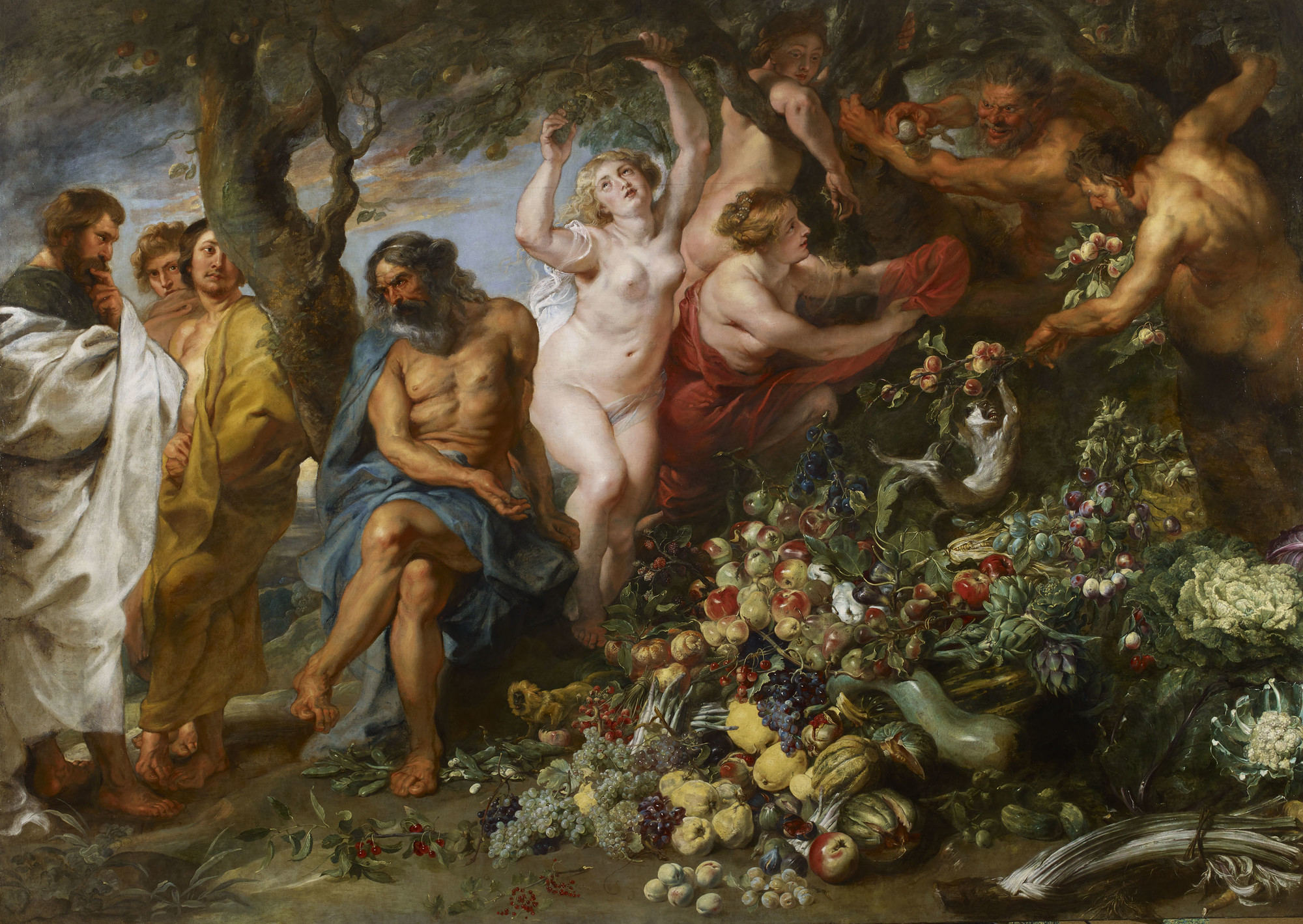
Pythagoras Advocating Vegetarianism (1628–1630), by Peter Paul Rubens (figures) and Frans Snyders (still life), mixing history painting and still life in a way typical of Flemish Baroque painting.

The hierarchy was mostly accepted by artists, and even genre specialists such as Jan Steen, Karel Dujardin and Vermeer produced a few history paintings, which were better paid when commissions could be obtained, but in general far harder to sell. The unhappy history of Rembrandt's last history commission, The Conspiracy of Claudius Civilis (1661) illustrates both his commitment to the form and the difficulties he had in finding an audience. In Flanders, as well as great quantities of pure genre works, there was a trend towards history paintings with a major genre element, whether animals, landscape or still life. Often the different elements were painted by different artists; Rubens and Frans Snyders often co-operated in this way.

The size of paintings, and very often the prices they realized, increasingly tended to reflect their position in the hierarchy in this period. Until the Romantic period the price and saleability of what were essentially landscapes could be increased by adding small mythological or religious figures, creating a landscape with..., a practice that went back to the beginnings of landscape painting in the Flemish world landscapes of Joachim Patinir in the early 16th century. Flemish Baroque painting was the last school to often paint the lowest genres at a large size, but usually combined with figure subjects.

An influential formulation of 1667 by André Félibien, a historiographer, architect and theoretician of French classicism became the classic statement of the theory for the 18th century:

Celui qui fait parfaitement des païsages est au-dessus d'un autre qui ne fait que des fruits, des fleurs ou des coquilles. Celui qui peint des animaux vivants est plus estimable que ceux qui ne représentent que des choses mortes & sans mouvement; & comme la figure de l'homme est le plus parfait ouvrage de Dieu sur la Terre, il est certain aussi que celui qui se rend l'imitateur de Dieu en peignant des figures humaines, est beaucoup plus excellent que tous les autres ... un Peintre qui ne fait que des portraits, n'a pas encore cette haute perfection de l'Art, & ne peut prétendre à l'honneur que reçoivent les plus sçavans. Il faut pour cela passer d'une seule figure à la représentation de plusieurs ensemble; il faut traiter l'histoire & la fable; il faut représenter de grandes actions comme les historiens, ou des sujets agréables comme les Poëtes; & montant encore plus haut, il faut par des compositions allégoriques, sçavoir couvrir sous le voile de la fable les vertus des grands hommes, & les mystères les plus relevez.

He who produces perfect landscapes is above another who only produces fruit, flowers or seashells. He who paints living animals is more estimable than those who only represent dead things without movement, and as man is the most perfect work of God on the earth, it is also certain that he who becomes an imitator of God in representing human figures, is much more excellent than all the others ... a painter who only does portraits still does not have the highest perfection of his art, and cannot expect the honour due to the most skilled. For that he must pass from representing a single figure to several together; history and myth must be depicted; great events must be represented as by historians, or like the poets, subjects that will please, and climbing still higher, he must have the skill to cover under the veil of myth the virtues of great men in allegories, and the mysteries they reveal".

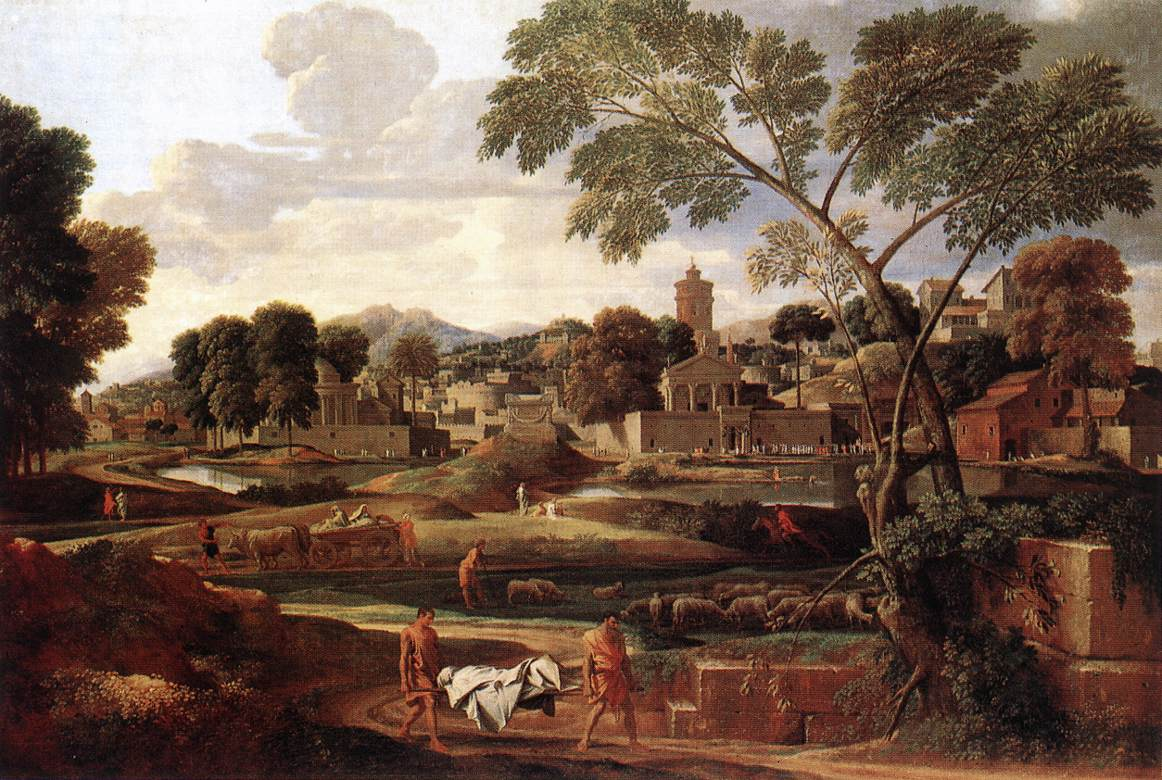
The Burial of Phocion by Poussin, 1648; a couple of small figures upgrade a landscape into a history painting

Allegorical painting was raised above other types of history painting; together they were the grand genre, including paintings with religious, mythological, historical, literary, or allegorical subjects—they embodied some interpretation of life or conveyed a moral or intellectual message. The gods and goddesses from the ancient mythologies represented different aspects of the human psyche, figures from religions represented different ideas, and history, like the other sources, represented a dialectic or play of ideas. Subjects with several figures ranked higher than single figures. For a long time, especially during the French Revolution, history painting often focused on depiction of the heroic male nude; though this waned in the 19th century.

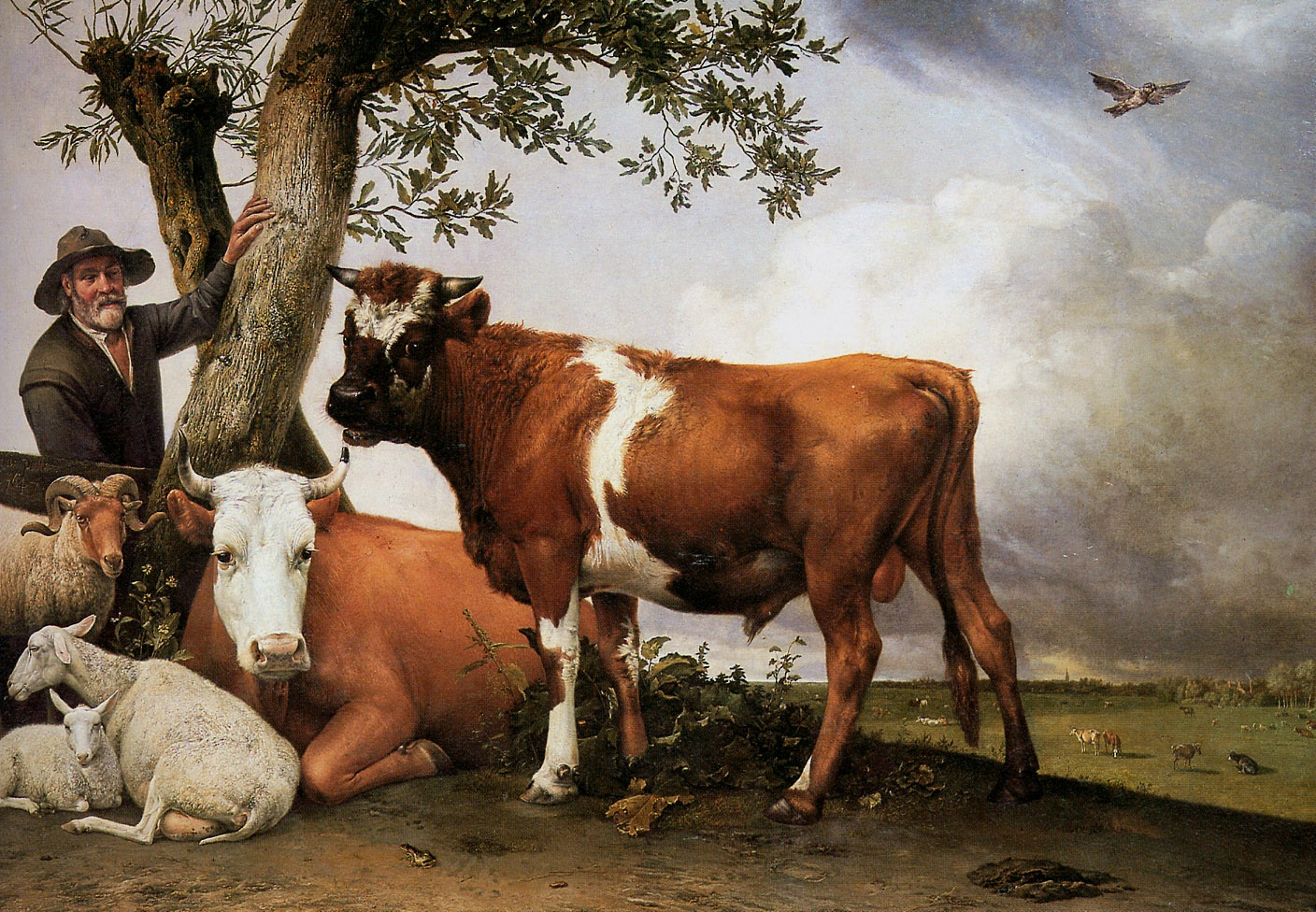
Paulus Potter, The Bull (1647); 3.4 metres wide. An unusually monumental animal painting that challenges the hierarchy of genres by its size; in the 19th century such works would become common.

After history painting came, in order of decreasing worth: portraits, scenes of everyday life (called scènes de genre, or "genre painting", and also petit genre to contrast it with the grande genre), landscapes, animal painting, and finally still lifes. In his formulation, such paintings were inferior because they were merely reportorial pictures without moral force or artistic imagination. Genre paintings—neither ideal in style, nor elevated in subject—were admired for their skill, ingenuity, and even humour, but never confused with high art.

The hierarchy of genres also had a corresponding hierarchy of formats: large format for history paintings, small format for still lifes. This had occasionally been breached in the past, especially in large Flemish works, and the monumental The Young Bull of the Dutch artist Paulus Potter, as well as the larger of the two Butchers' Shop canvases of Annibale Carracci. But for the most part the relative prices obtainable for the different genres ensured the hierarchy of size also; it would not have been economic to paint a very large subject from the lower genres, except for commissioned group portraits. Rubens' largest landscapes were painted for his own houses.

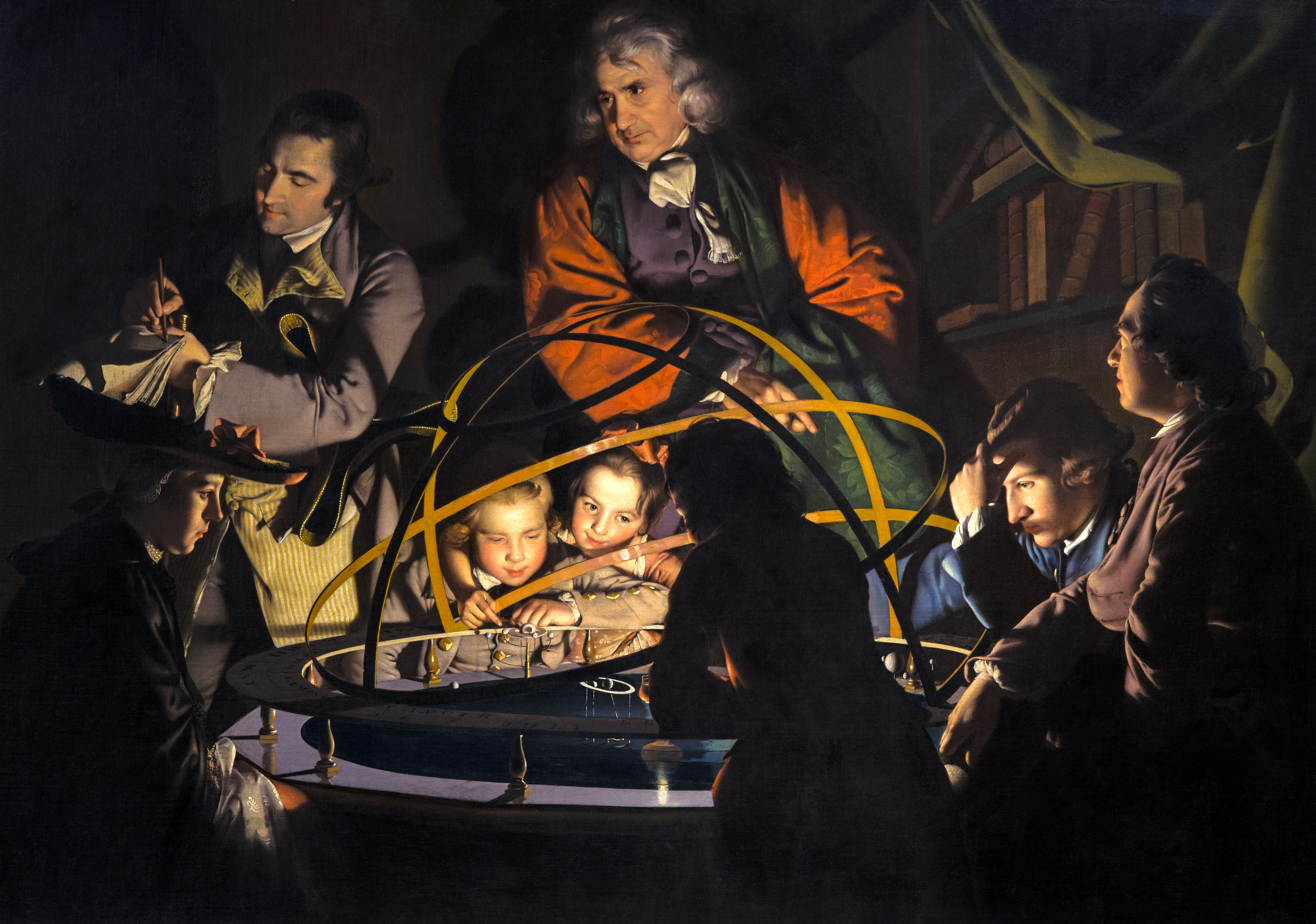
Joseph Wright of Derby, A Philosopher Lecturing on the Orrery, 1766, a conversation piece with no portraits and with the full seriousness of the history painting.

The use of the pictorial elements of painting such as line and color to convey an ultimate unifying theme or idea was regarded as the highest expression of art, and an idealism was adopted in art, whereby forms seen in nature would be generalized, and in turn subordinated to the unity of the artwork. It aimed at universal truth through the imitation of nature. Later dissenting theorists, such as Gotthold Ephraim Lessing, held that this focus on allegory was faulty and based on a wrong analogy between the plastic arts and poetry rooted in the Horatian dictum ut pictura poesis ("as is painting so is poetry").

The British painter Sir Joshua Reynolds in his Discourses of the 1770s and 1780s, reiterated the argument for still life to the lowest position in the hierarchy of genres on the grounds that it interfered with the painter's access to central forms, those products of the mind's generalising powers. At the summit reigned history painting, centred on the human body: familiarity with the forms of the body permitted the mind of the painter, by comparing innumerable instances of the human form, to abstract from it those typical or central features that represented the body's essence or ideal.

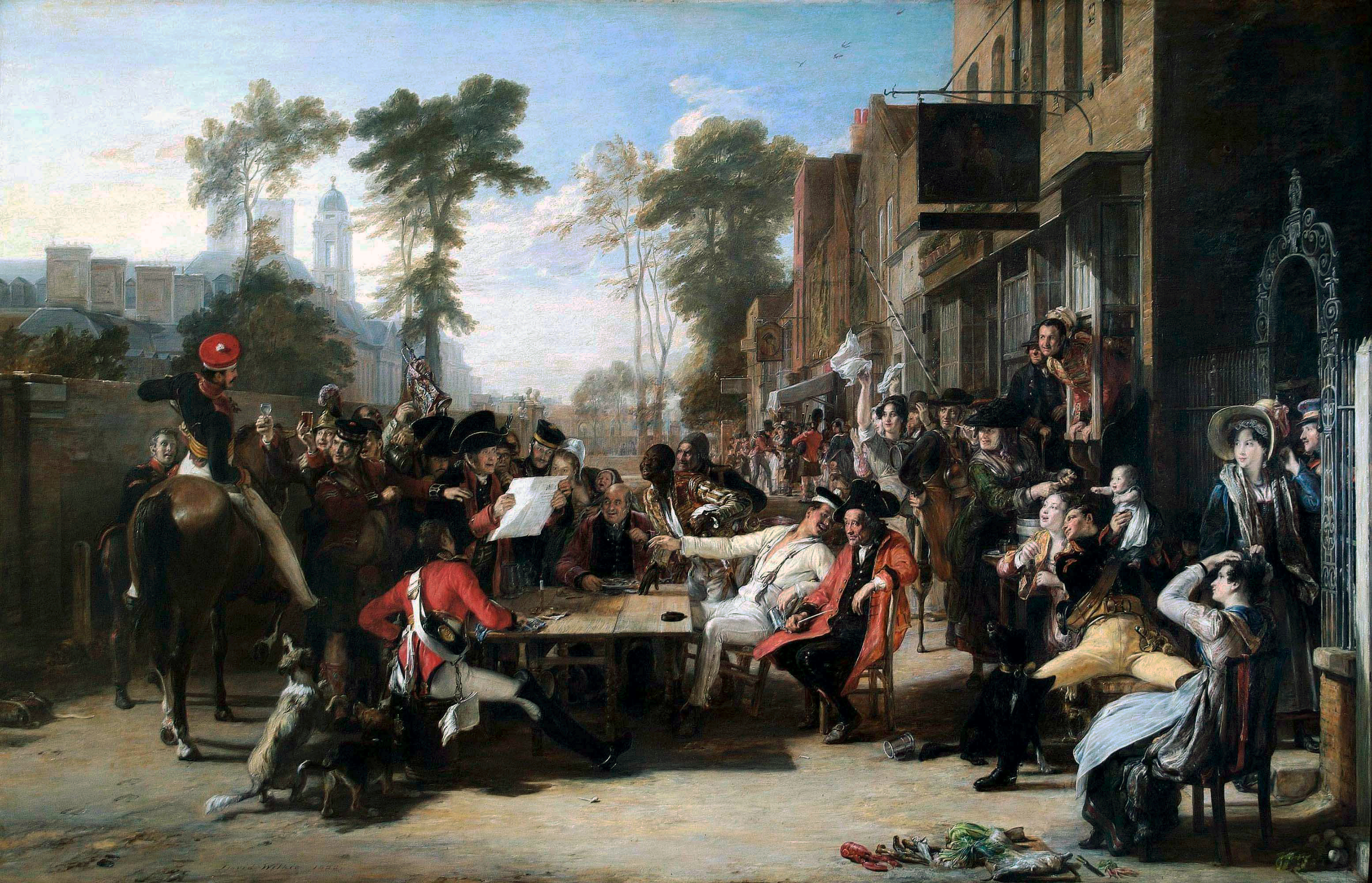
Sir David Wilkie, The Chelsea Pensioners reading the Waterloo Dispatch, 1822. Genre or history painting? The types have merged, in a way typical of the 19th century.

Though Reynolds agreed with Félibien about the natural order of the genres, he held that an important work from any genre of painting could be produced under the hand of genius: "Whether it is the human figure, an animal, or even inanimate objects, there is nothing, however unpromising in appearance, but may be raised into dignity, convey sentiment, and produce emotion, in the hands of a painter of genius. What was said of Virgil, that he threw even the dung about the ground with an air of dignity, may be applied to Titian; whatever he touched, however naturally mean, and habitually familiar, by a kind of magic he invested with grandeur and importance."

Though European academies usually strictly insisted on this hierarchy, over their reign, many artists were able to invent new genres which raised the lower subjects to the importance of history painting. Reynolds himself achieved this by inventing the portraiture style that was called the Grand Manner, where he flattered his sitters by likening them to mythological characters. Jean-Antoine Watteau invented a genre that was called fêtes galantes, where he would show scenes of courtly amusements taking place in Arcadian settings; these often had a poetic and allegorical quality which were considered to ennoble them.

Claude Lorrain practised a genre called the ideal landscape, where a composition would be loosely based on nature and dotted with classical ruins as a setting for a biblical or historical theme. It artfully combined landscape and history painting, thereby legitimising the former. It is synonymous with the term historical landscape which received official recognition in the Académie française when a Prix de Rome for the genre was established in 1817. Finally, Jean-Baptiste-Siméon Chardin was able to create still life paintings that were considered to have the charm and beauty as to be placed alongside the best allegorical subjects. However, aware of this hierarchy, Chardin began including figures in his work in about 1730, mainly women and children.

== 19th century ==
Romanticism greatly increased the status of landscape painting, beginning in British art and more gradually that of genre painting, which began to influence history painting in the anecdotal treatments of the Style Troubadour in France and equivalent trends elsewhere. Landscapes grew in size to reflect their new importance, often matching history paintings, especially in the American Hudson River School and Russian painting. Animal paintings also increased in size and dignity, but the full-length portrait, even of royalty, became mostly reserved for large public buildings.

Until the middle of the 19th century, women were largely unable to paint history paintings as they were not allowed to participate in the final process of artistic training—that of life drawing, in order to protect their modesty. They could work from reliefs, prints, casts and from the Old Masters, but not from the nude model. Instead they were encouraged to participate in the lower painting forms such as portraiture, landscape and genre. These were considered more feminine in that they appealed to the eye rather than the mind.

Toward the end of the 19th century, painters and critics began to rebel against the many rules of the Académie française, including the status accorded to history painting, which was beginning to be bought mainly by public bodies of one sort or another, as private buyers preferred subjects from lower down the hierarchy. In Britain the Pre-Raphaelite movement tried to revitalize the history painting, with mixed success; other movements made similar efforts. Many Pre-Raphaelites ended their careers mainly painting other subjects. New artistic movements included the Realists and Impressionists, which each sought to depict the present moment and daily life as observed by the eye, and unattached from historical significance; the Realists often choosing genre painting and still life, while the Impressionists would most often focus on landscapes.
