= Prince William V Gallery =

- Galerij Prins Willem V
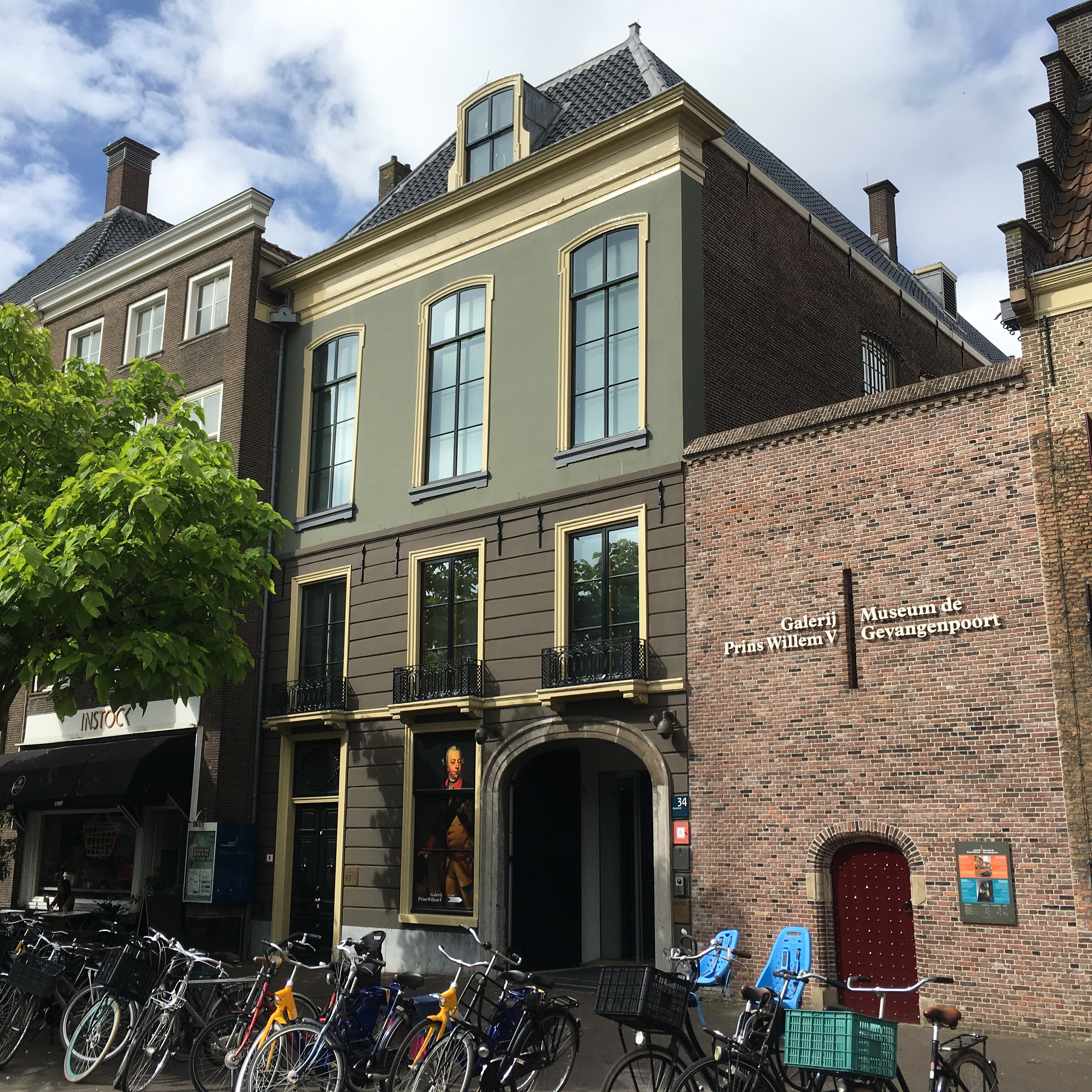
- The Gallery is on the 2nd floor of the building in the center. On the right is the entrance to both gallery and the adjacent Museum Gevangenpoort
- Established: 1774
- Location: The Hague
- Coordinates: 52°4′45.9″N 4°18′37.39″E
- Type: Art museum
- Accreditation: Dutch Museum Association
- Collections: Dutch Golden Age
- Collection size: ± 150
- Visitors: 29,236 (2017)
- Founder: William V, Prince of Orange
- Executive director: Emilie Gordenker
- Business director: Sander Uitdenbogaard
- Curator: Ariane van Suchtelen
- Architect: Philip Willem Schonck
- Owner: Mauritshuis
- Public transit access: Kneuterdijk / Lange Vijverberg
- Parking: Heulstraat
- Website: Official website

The Prince William V Gallery is an art gallery on the Buitenhof in The Hague that currently shares an entrance with the Gevangenpoort museum. It is a recreation of the original gallery Galerij Prins Willem V, once founded there by William V, Prince of Orange, in 1774. The displayed paintings are part of the collection of the Mauritshuis. Amongst the paintings on display are works by Peter Paul Rubens, Jan Steen, Paulus Potter and Gerard van Honthorst.

== History ==
Though built in 1774, the gallery has not been continuously open, mostly because the collection was abducted by the French 20 years after it opened and another 20 years passed before most of the works were recovered. In the meantime another gallery was opened in nearby Huis ten Bosch and undeterred by events, Prince William continued collecting art for a new gallery. After recovery of most important works in 1815, the large collection was re-housed in 1822 in the Mauritshuis. The old location was kept on as an archive. It wasn't reopened as an art gallery until 1977.

=== Original 1774 gallery ===
The collection of paintings of the gallery had been established by previous stadtholders of the Netherlands, members of the House of Orange-Nassau. Prince William V inherited the family collection when he was just four years old, after his father died. At that time the paintings were spread out over a number of his residences. The prince took up a special interest in paintings and made his first buy when he was fifteen years old. Sometimes he would acquire an entire collection, such as the Govert van Slingelandt collection in 1768. In 1763 he instructed his court painter Tethart Haag to create an inventory of his extensive collection. The latter also served as curator to the collection of paintings owned by the stadtholder and was his chief adviser in the purchase of paintings. The prince aspired to be seen as an equal to the great monarchs of Europe and the possession of a great art collection was, at that time, considered to be an element typical of such a status. He decided to bring his collection together in one location, so he could present it to his guests. To that end he bought two adjacent houses near his residence in The Hague, where he planned for the construction of an art gallery for his collection. During this process Tethart Haag served as his main advisor. The gallery was consequently built in 1773–1774, according to the wishes of the prince and under the direction of Tethart Haag. In 1774 the gallery opened, and in addition to the guests of the prince, it became the first museum in the Netherlands where the general public was allowed to visit. The prince appointed Tethart Haag as the first director of the art gallery-museum. In 1795 the collection was abducted by the French and housed in the Louvre as war booty. Under a later treaty many paintings were recovered in 1815, but many were not, such as the portrait of William III of Orange, now in the Museum of Fine Arts of Lyon.

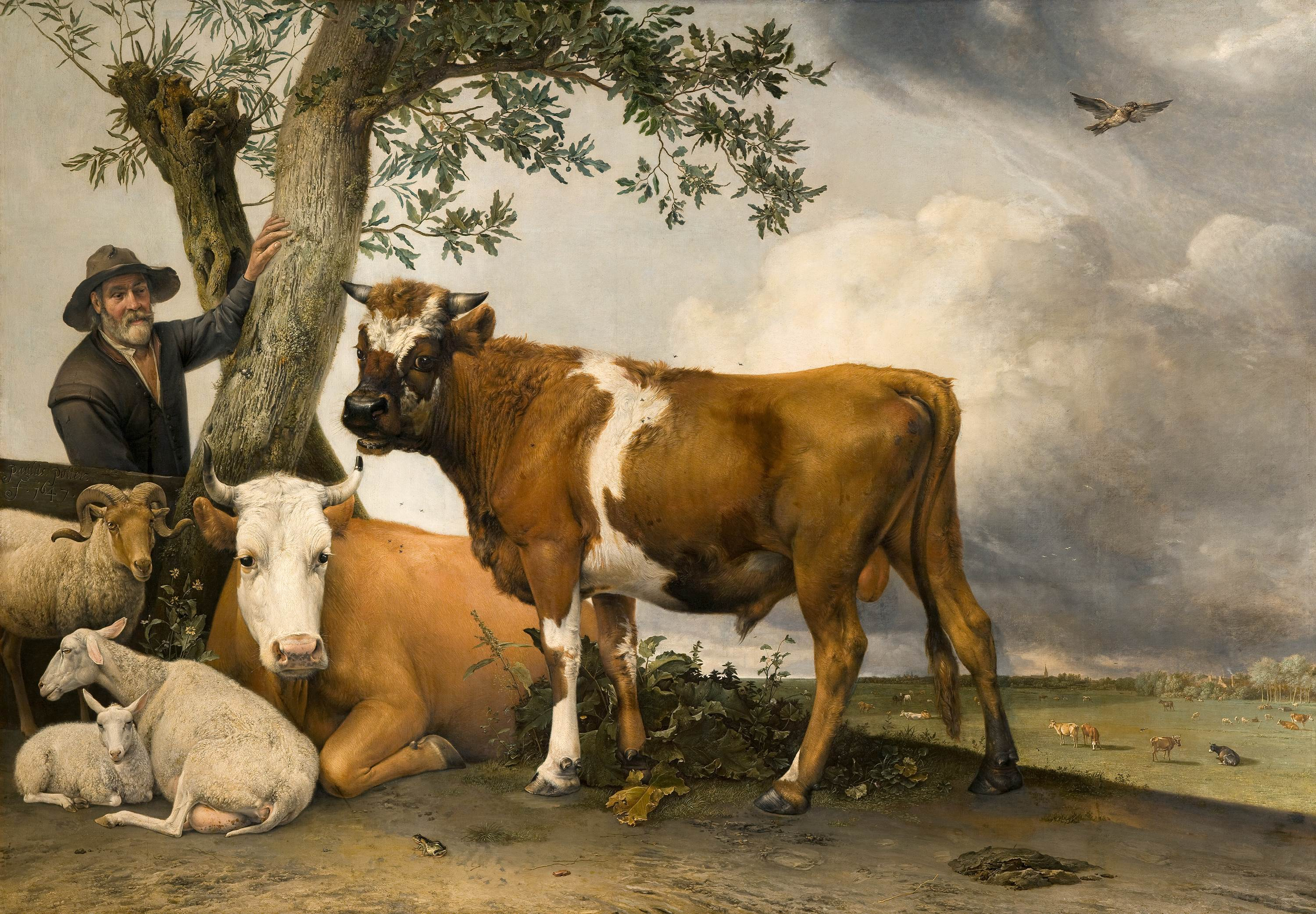
The Young Bull was displayed in the Louvre for 20 years among Raphaels and Titians that were taken from Italy as war booty

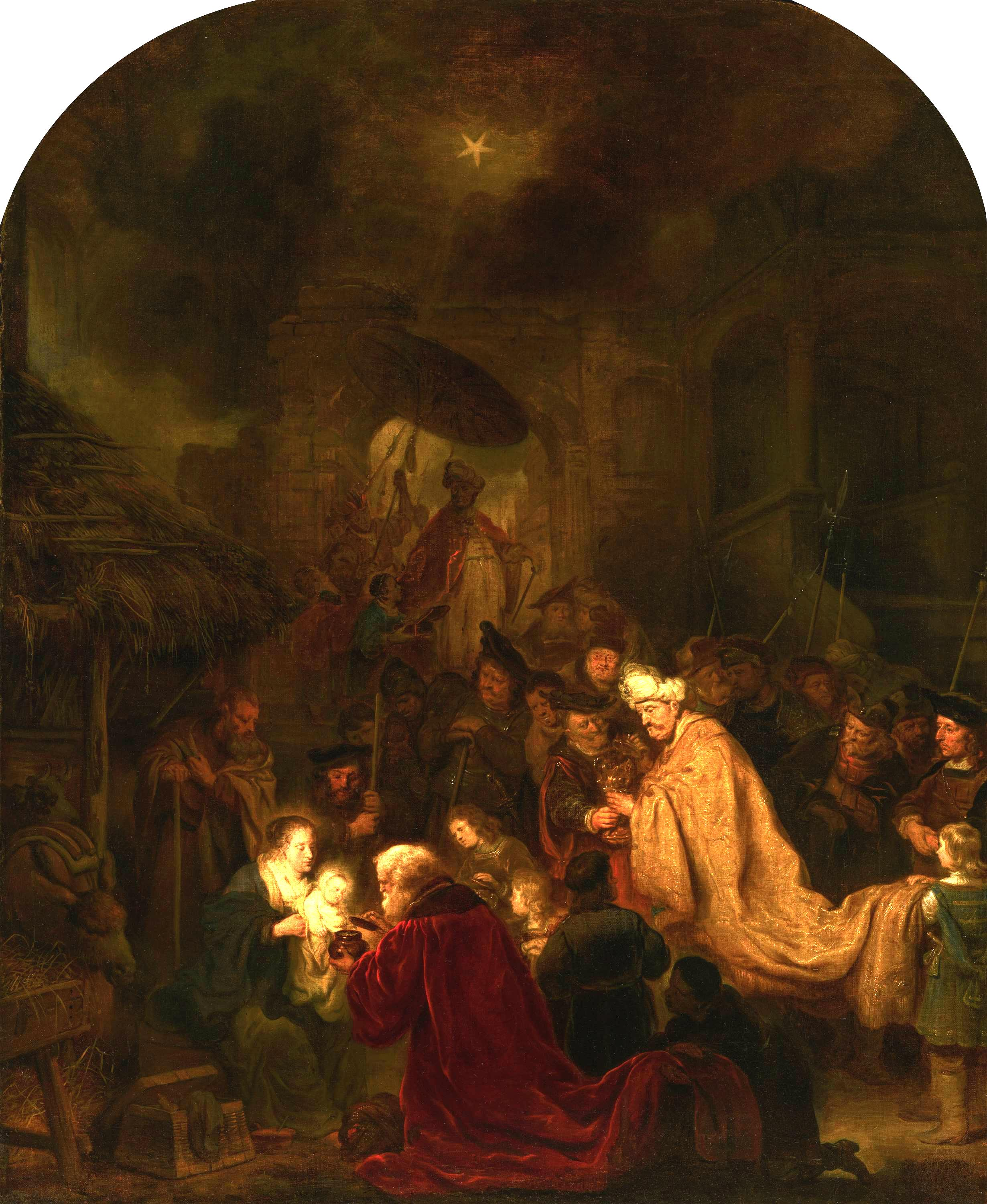
The Adoration of the Magi by Salomon Koninck, was the first painting William V, Prince of Orange, added to the existing collection

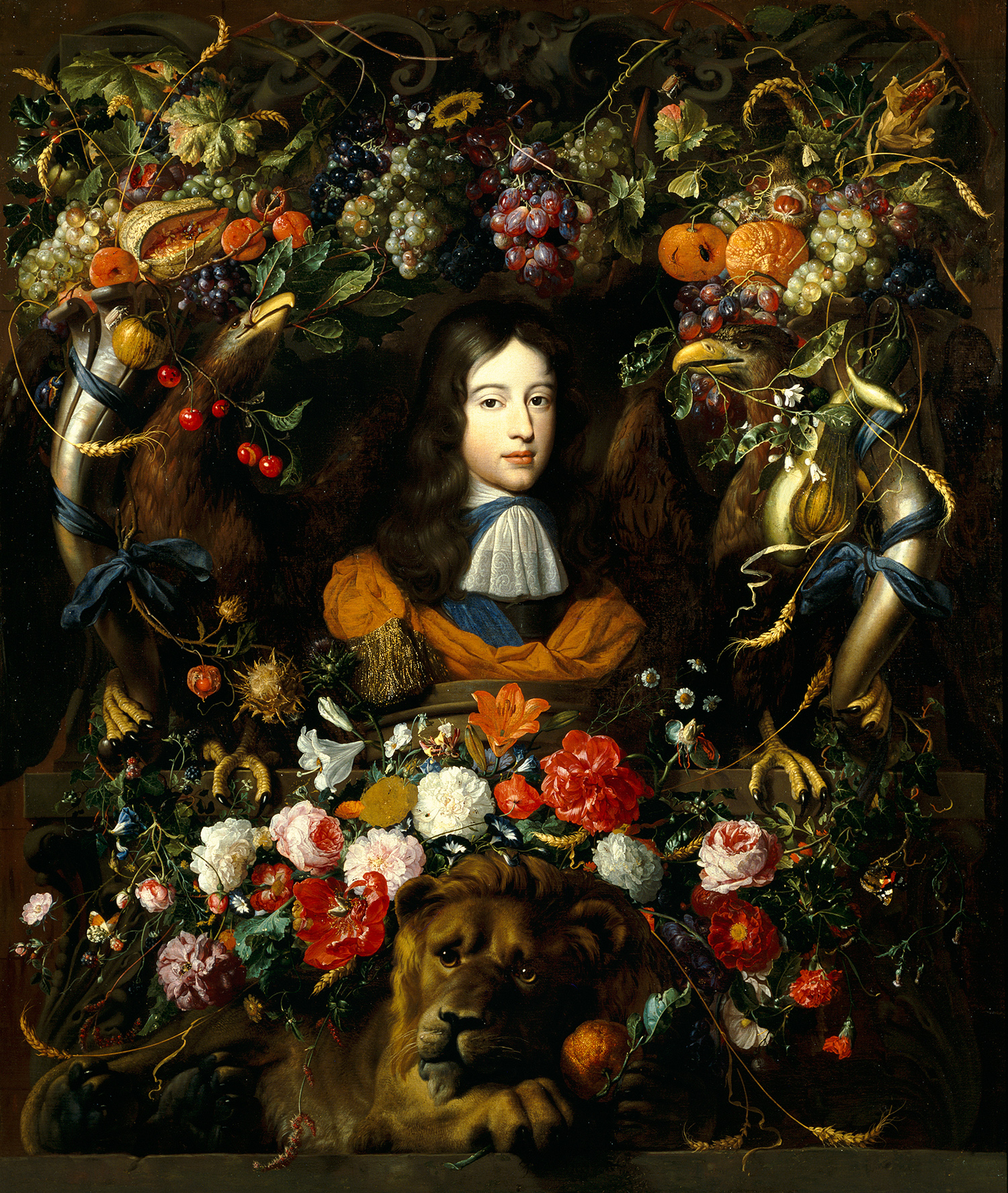
Portrait of William III of Orange by Jan Davidsz. de Heem, a war booty taken to France 1795, never to be returned.

Some of the more notable works that were abducted to France and came back were:

image	title	painter	date	Mauritshuis #ID
	Portrait of Robert Cheeseman	Hans Holbein	1533	276
	The Garden of Eden with the Fall of Man	Peter Paul Rubens; Jan Brueghel the Elder	1617	253
	Portrait of Anna Wake (1605-1669)	Anthony van Dyck	1628	240
	Appelles painting Campaspe	Willem van Haecht	1630	266
	Simeon's song of praise	Rembrandt	1631	145
	Susanna	Rembrandt	1636	147
	The feast of the gods at the wedding of Peleus and Thetis	Abraham Bloemaert	1638	17
	Choir of the Nieuwe Kerk in Delft with the tomb of William the Silent	Gerard Houckgeest	1651	57
	Allegorical portrait of the Steyn family as scene of Diogenes	Caesar van Everdingen	1652	39
	The young mother	Gerrit Dou	1658	32
	Ships on a Calm Sea	Willem van de Velde the Younger	1658	200
	Peasants in an inn	Adriaen van Ostade	1662	128
	A Woman Writing Music	Gabriël Metsu	1663	94
	Flower Still life with a watch	Willem van Aelst	1663	2
	Beach scene	Adriaen van de Velde	1665	198
	Self-portrait 1669	Rembrandt	1669	840

== Modern gallery ==
Since 2010, museum visitors can view the restored art gallery that can be reached through a special staircase that connects the two buildings. The collection which hangs here is a modern reconstruction of the original 1774 art cabinet that was situated upstairs above a fencing school. The paintings, taken from various collections, hang crowded together on the walls in the style of the late 18th century. An effort is made to create an impression of the original gallery, rather than any historical accuracy in the choice where which paintings hang specifically. Former top pieces from the gallery such as Potter's Young Bull hang elsewhere, and the gallery itself underwent several changes in exhibition format after it reopened in 1815. Purchases made to replace lost paintings grew the collection so that in 1822 the collection (then called Koninklijk Kabinet van Schilderijen te 's-Gravenhage) was moved to the Mauritshuis Royal Picture Gallery which remains the formal owner of the paintings on display. The location was used as an archive until it reopened in 1977, but closed again as it underwent restoration work in 1993-1994 and in 2009.

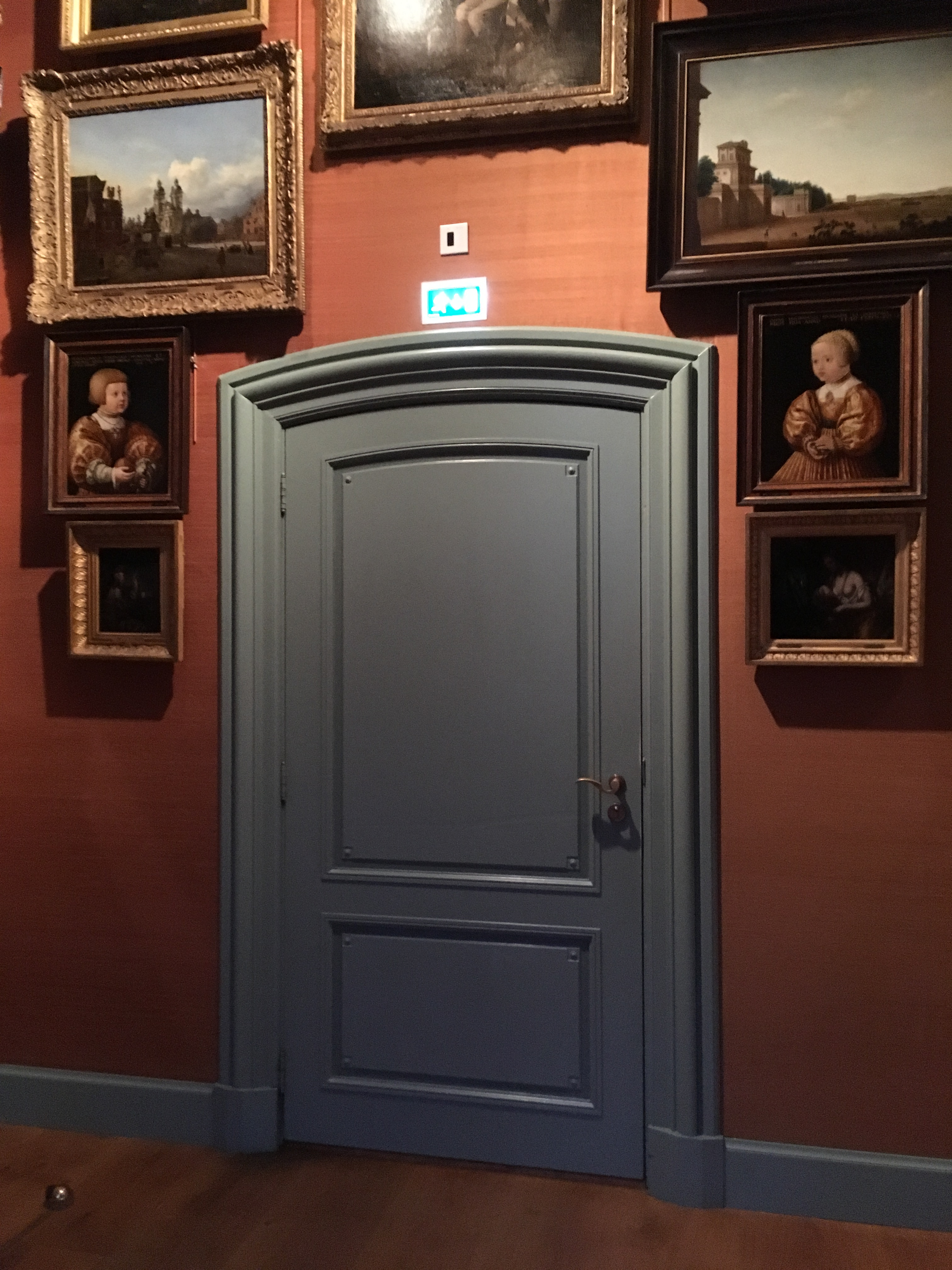
Entrance through the anteroom

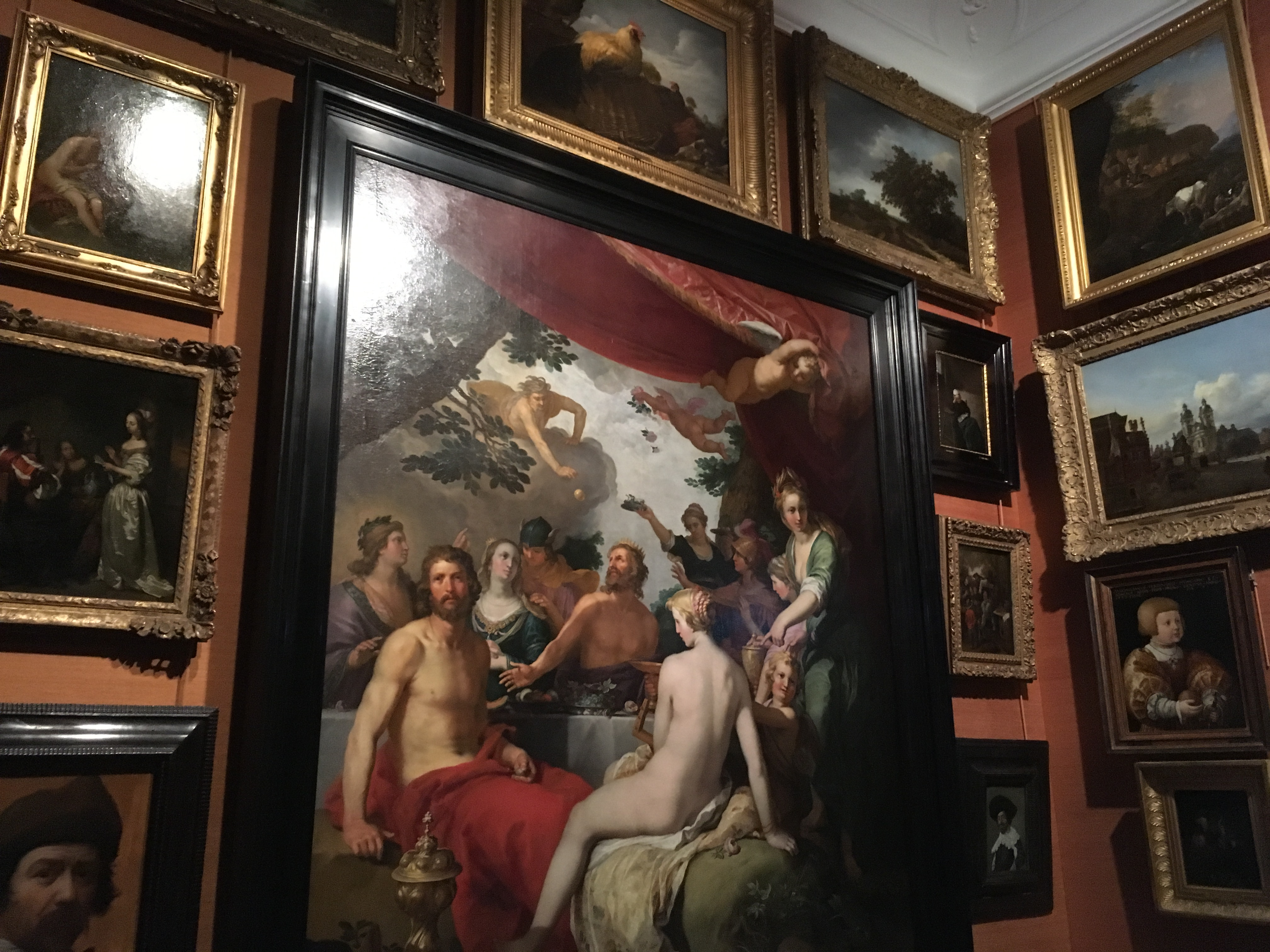
18th century style display of paintings

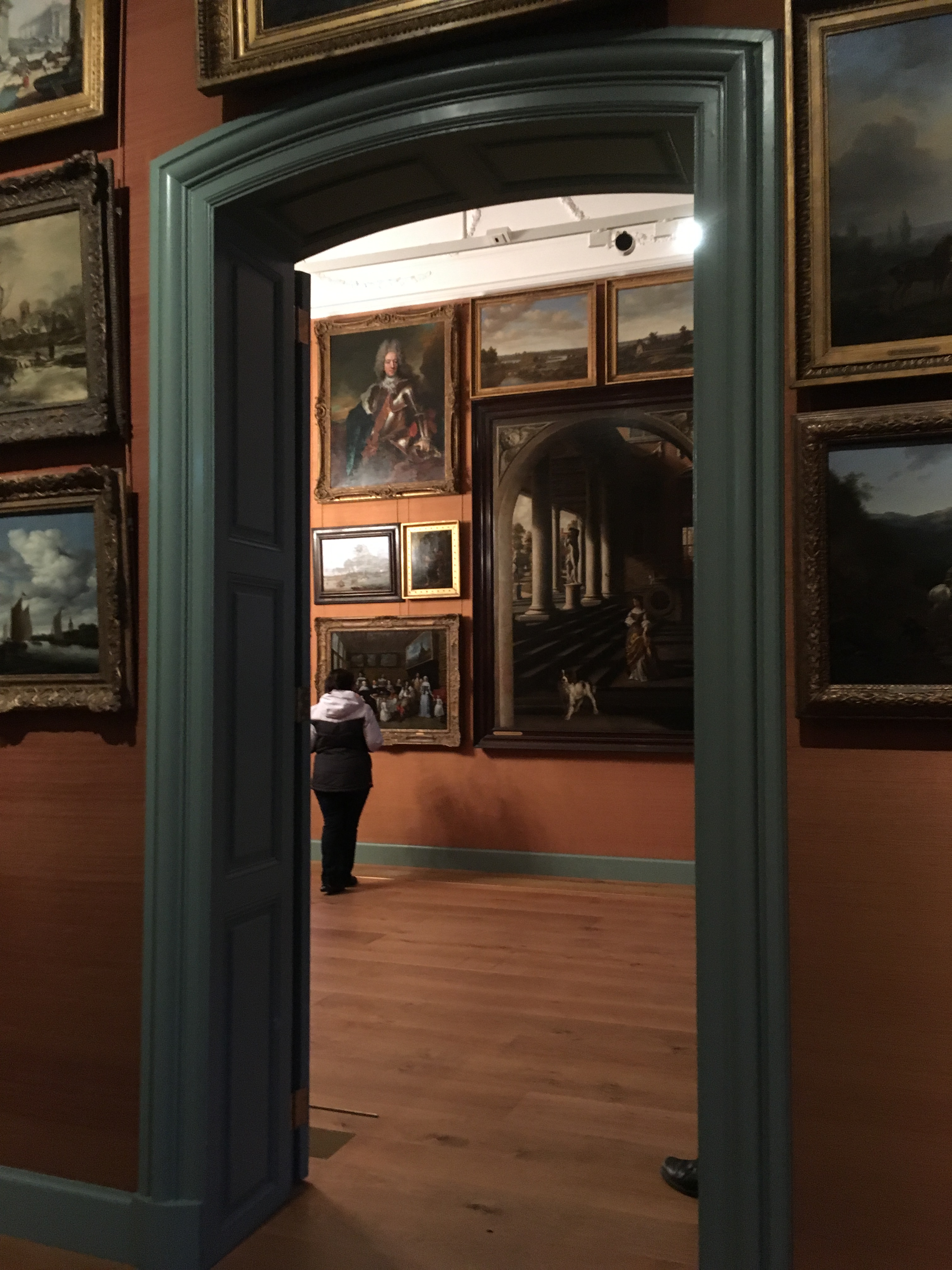
Entrance to the gallery hall

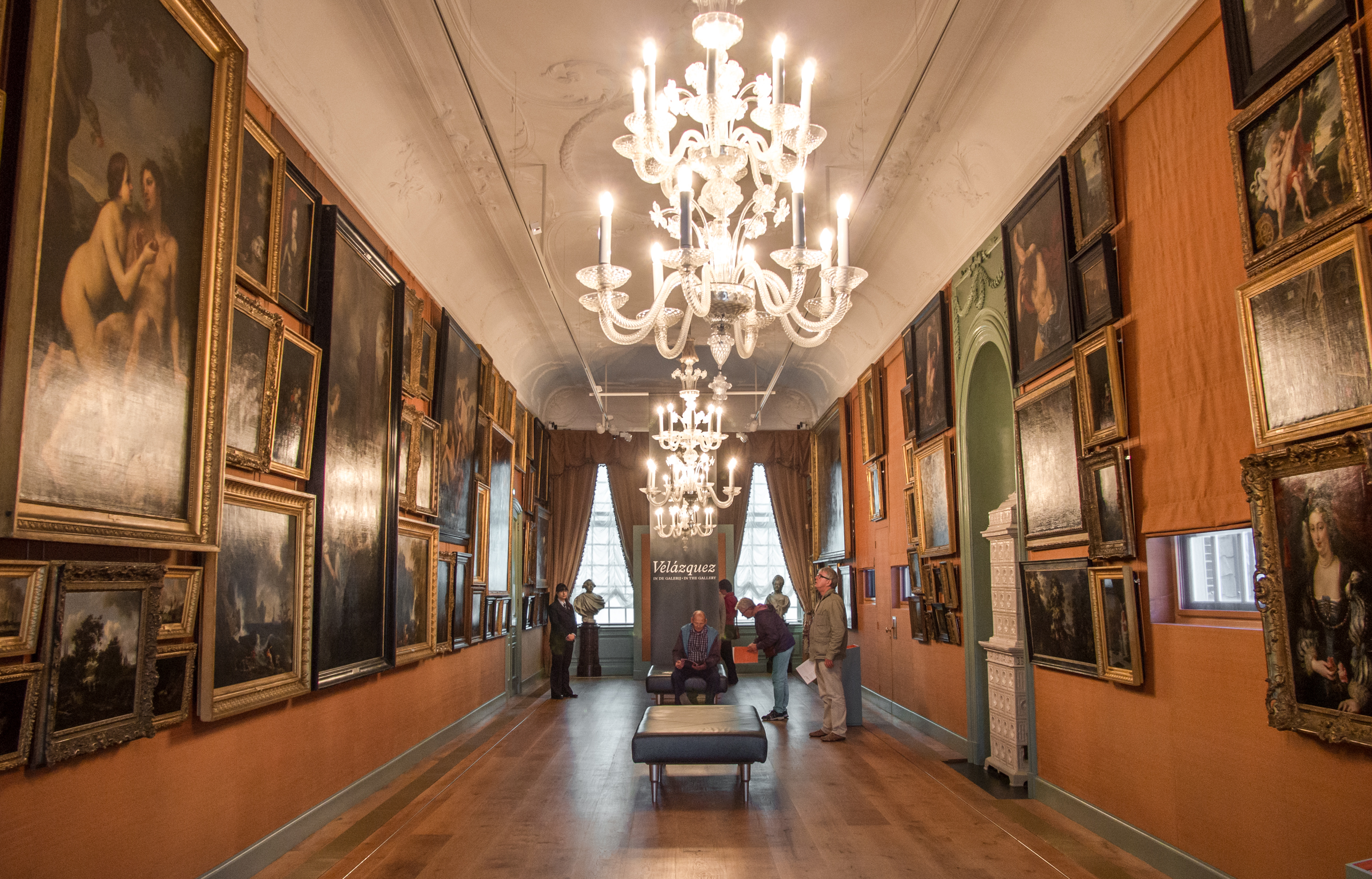
Interior of the gallery hall

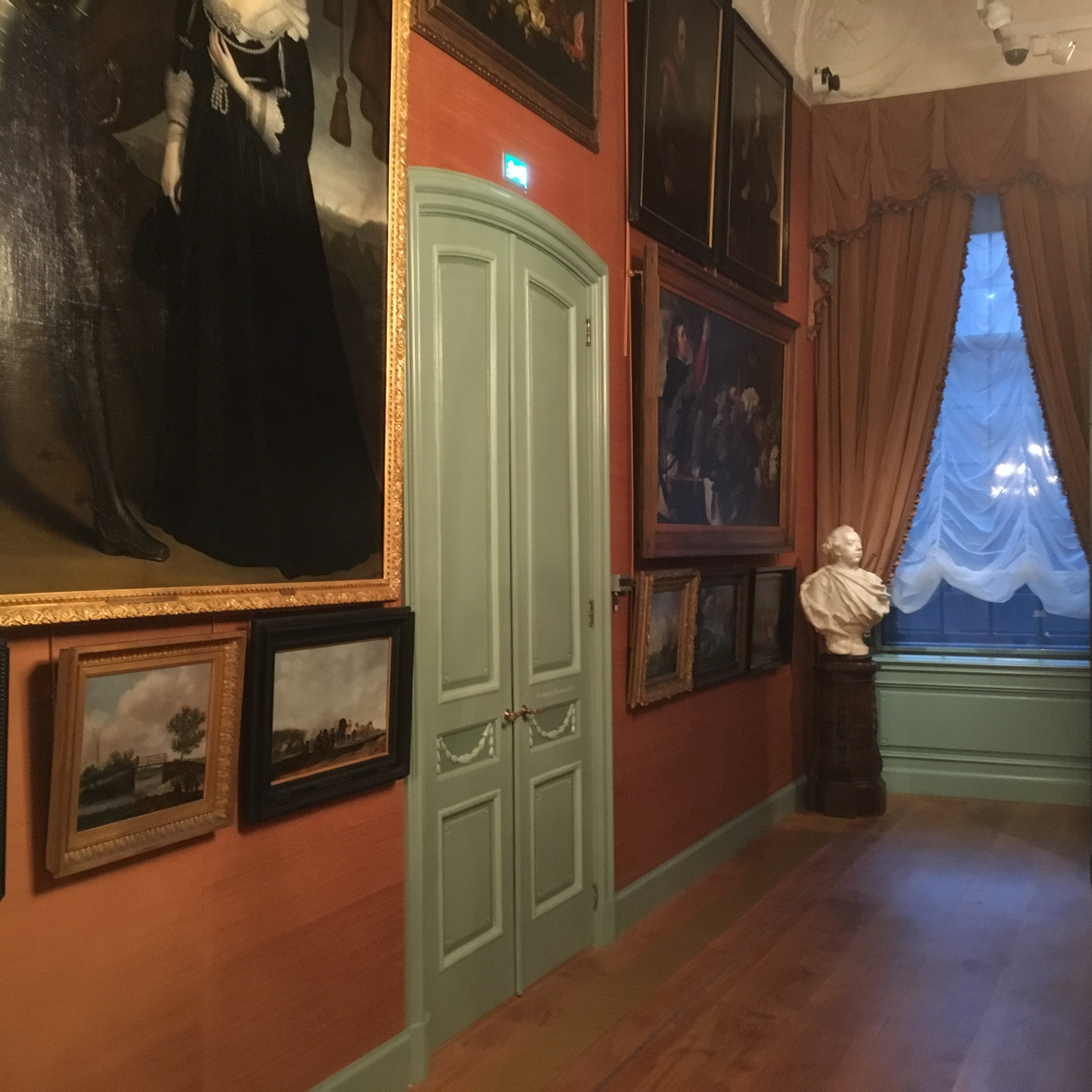
Inside the gallery hall, with bust of William V, Prince of Orange
