= The Young Bull =

Painting

- De stier (Dutch)
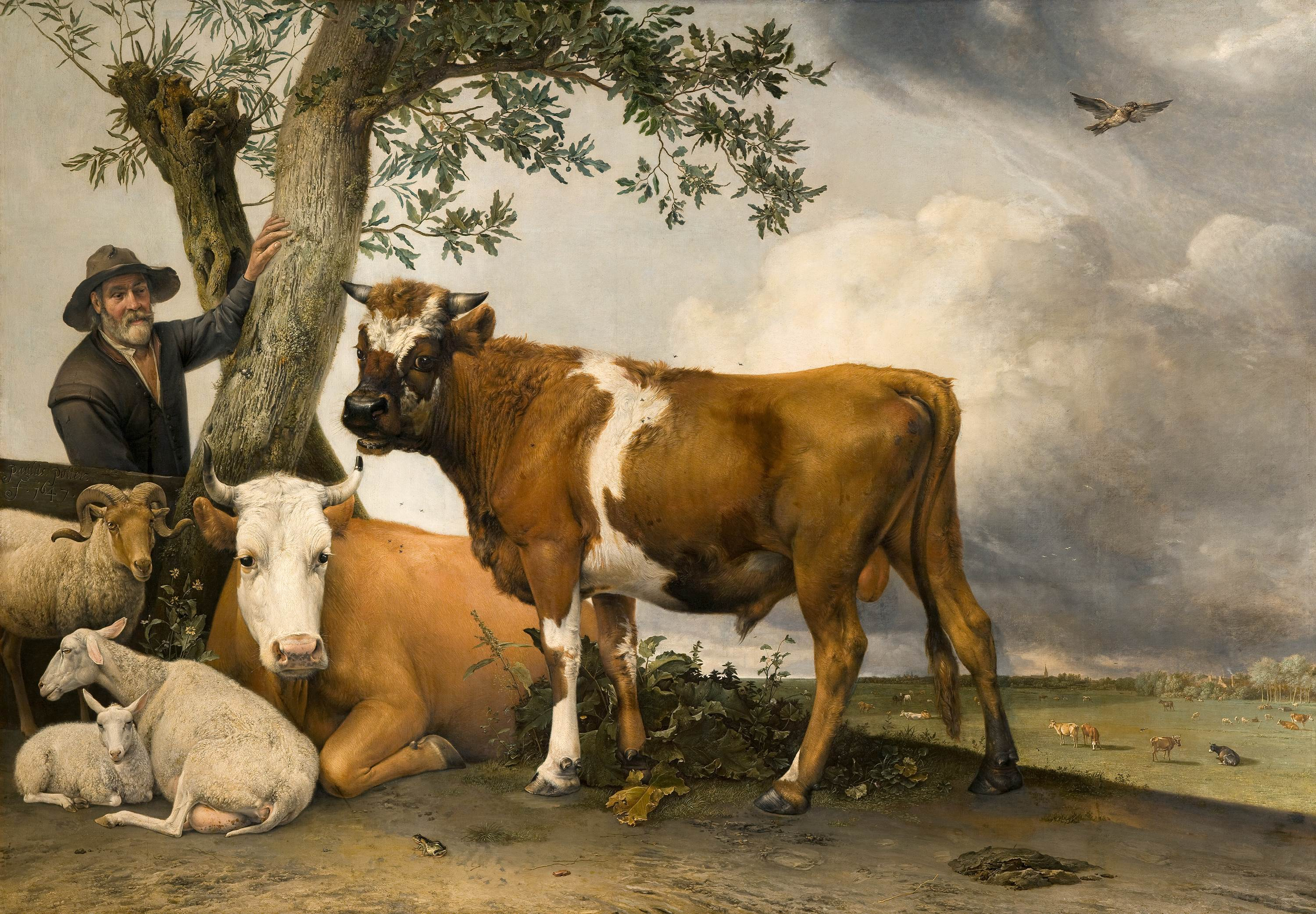
- Artist: Paulus Potter
- Year: 1647
- Medium: Oil on canvas
- Movement: Dutch Golden Age painting
- Subject: Bull
- Dimensions: 235.5 cm × 339 cm (92.7 in × 133 in)
- Location: Mauritshuis, The Hague, Netherlands

The Young Bull (Dutch: De jonge stier) or The Bull (Dutch: De stier) is an oil painting of a bull by Paulus Potter. It is in the collection of the Mauritshuis in The Hague in the Netherlands.

At about life-size, this is an unusually monumental animal painting that challenges the hierarchy of genres by its almost heroic treatment of an animal. The large size allows space for very detailed realism, including a number of flies, that was both admired and criticised, especially in the 19th century.

The painting is signed and dated 1647, meaning that Potter, who was born in November 1625, was only 22 when he completed it; he died in 1654, before he reached 30. The painting was highly admired in the 18th and 19th centuries; in the 1870s the French artist and critic Eugène Fromentin asserted confidently that it, Rembrandt's The Night Watch, and his The Anatomy Lesson of Dr. Nicolaes Tulp (also in the Mauritshuis) were the three most famous paintings in the Netherlands.

The painting was eventually enlarged by Potter, who added extra strips of canvas on both sides and at the top to his original composition, which just included the bull itself. The village in the background is Rijswijk, between Delft and The Hague. Paintings of animals in landscape were Potter's speciality, this is the largest apart from his single life-size equestrian portrait; most of his works are far smaller.

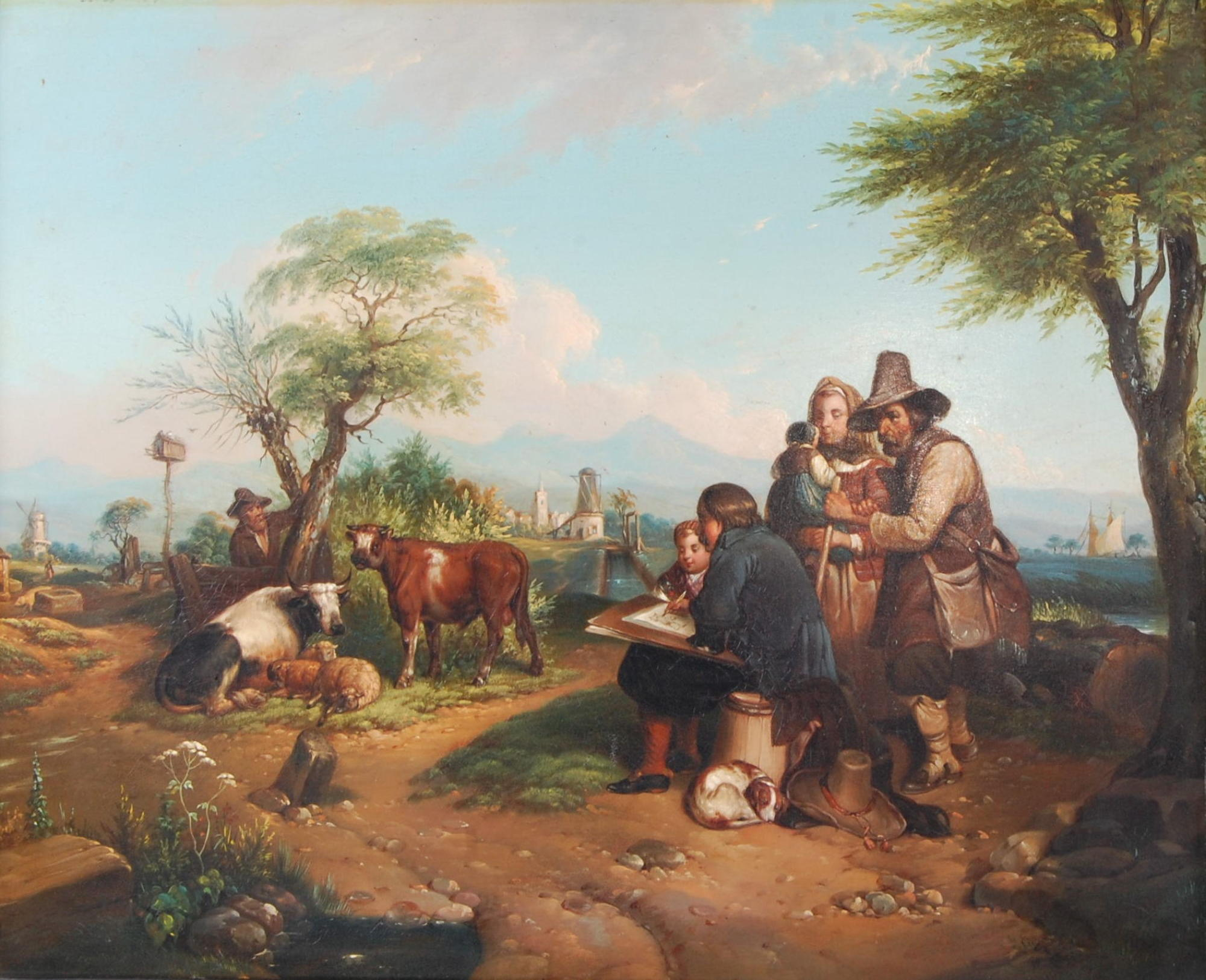
Eugène Lepoittevin, Paul Potter Painting the Young Bull, 1843.

The bull was a symbol of prosperity to the Dutch, hitherto overlooked in art, and apart from the horse was by far the most commonly shown animal in Dutch Golden Age painting; goats were used to indicate Italy. This is an enormous and famous portrait which was in the Prince William V Gallery collection that Napoleon took to Paris in 1795 and was returned under the terms of the Treaty of Paris (1815). It hung in the Louvre for 20 years. Livestock analysts have noted from the depiction of the various parts of the bull's anatomy that it appears to be a composite of studies of six different animals from widely different ages.

Like the equally life-size bird in Jan Asselijn's The Threatened Swan (1650), the bull can also function as a symbol of the Dutch Republic. Probably not until Whistlejacket, a painting of an English racehorse of a century later, was an equally monumental animal portrait to be found.
