= Isaac Blessing Jacob (Gerbrand van den Eeckhout) =

1642 painting by Gerbrand van den Eeckhout

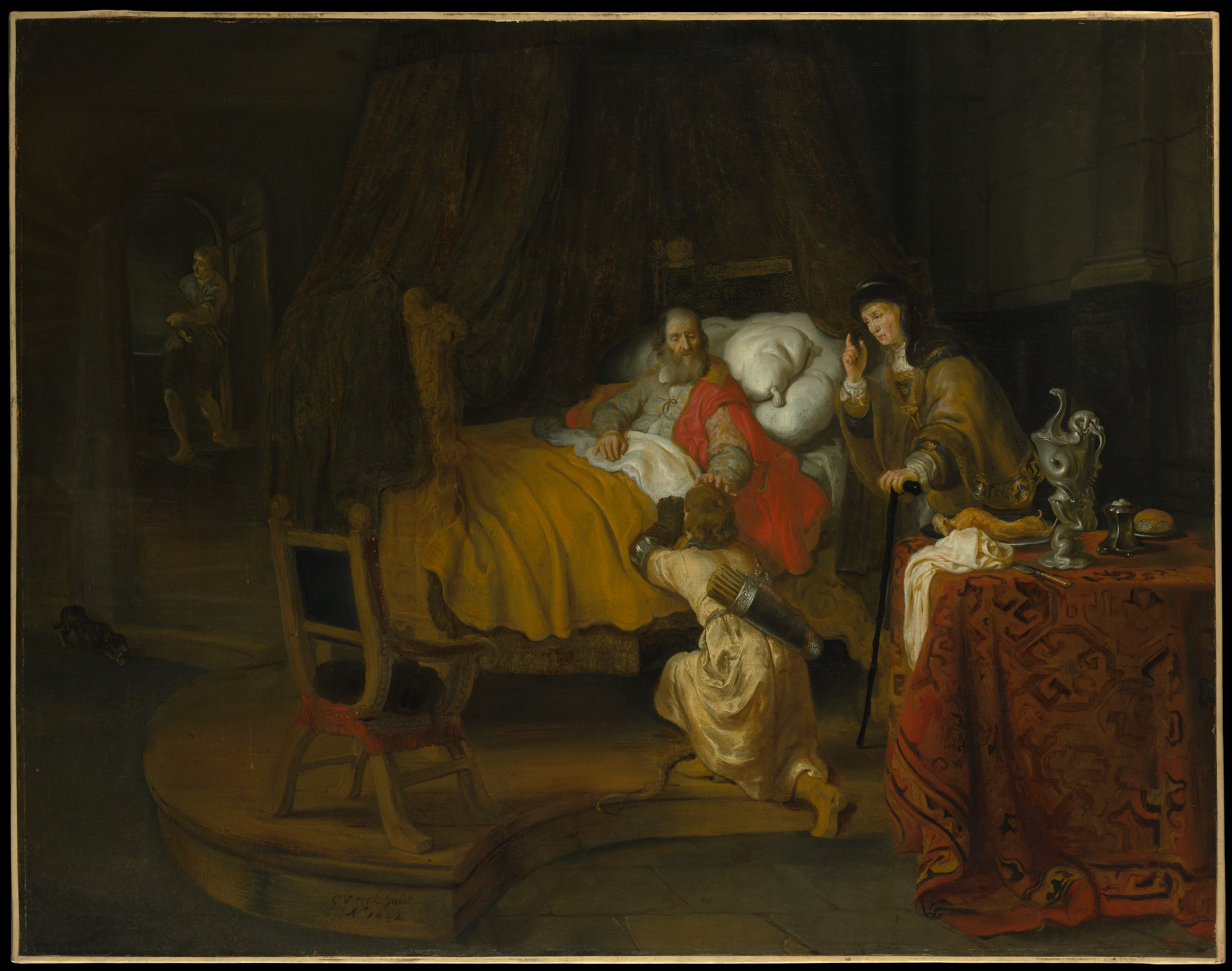
- Artist: Gerbrand van den Eeckhout
- Year: 1642
- Medium: oil paint, canvas
- Dimensions: 100.6 cm (39.6 in) × 128.3 cm (50.5 in)
- Location: Metropolitan Museum of Art
- Accession: 25.110.16

Isaac Blessing Jacob is a 1642 religious painting by Gerbrand van den Eeckhout. It shows Jacob kneeling at the bed of his blind father Isaac under the watchful eye of his mother Rebecca as he receives his brother Esau's blessing. It is in the collection of the Metropolitan Museum of Art.

== Description ==
The painting shows the biblical story quite literally, with Jacob wearing his older brother's "best jacket" (which is too large) and his hands and neck have been covered in goatskin. On his back is a hunting quiver of arrows, but on the floor is a bow that has its string loose, indicating that it couldn't have been used in its current state. On a side table covered with a carpet, a still-life arrangement with napkin, salt-cellar and wine flask accompany Jacob's "tasty goat meat". The most prominent item on the table is the ewer of the Amsterdam silversmith's guild, a famous silver object that itself shares a brotherly theme. Van Eeckhout's father was a member of the silversmith's guild, and the salt cellar could be one of his creations.

== Provenance ==
Little is known of the early history of the painting, though it is considered an example of Van Eeckhout's dependence on Rembrandt in his early years. This painting came into The Met's collection via the Collis P. Huntington bequest in 1925. It was first researched in 1990 when the provenance was documented back to the sale of Elizabeth Valckenier, née Hooft (1712–96), widow of Wouter Valckenier. It is probably the same painting that was sold at the Confrerie Pictura in The Hague on 24 April 1737 as a piece representing Isaac blessing his son Jacob by Gerbrand van den Eekhout.

== Silver cup ==
The choice of subject by the 21-year-old son of a goldsmith who himself chose painting over engraving and smithwork is possibly related to the high regard that the artists of Amsterdam had for this memorial cup. Van Eeckhout drew it with variations as one of several examples in a print book published by Cornelis Danckert.

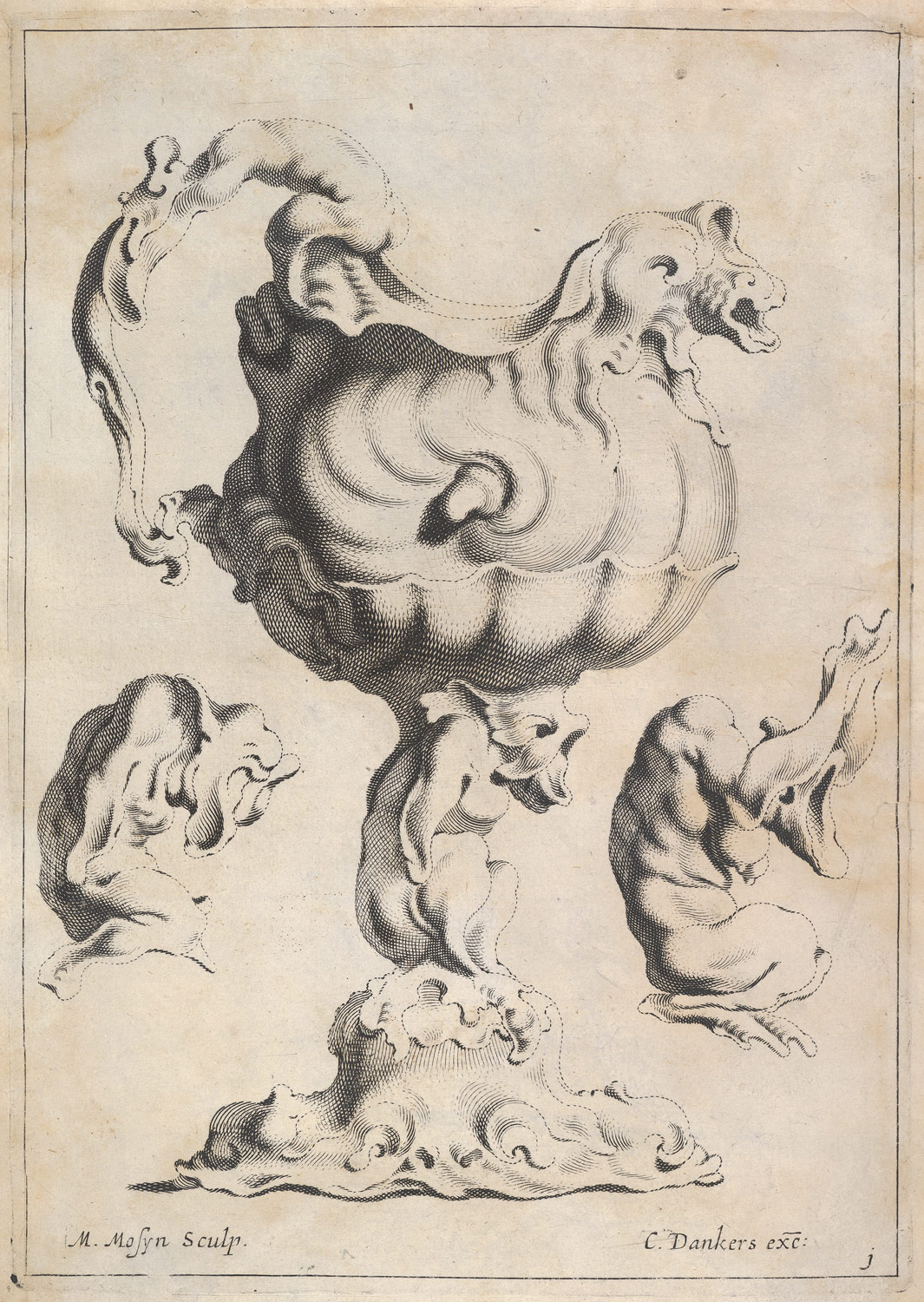
Engraving (in reverse) by Michiel Mosyn after Gerbrandt van Eeckhout

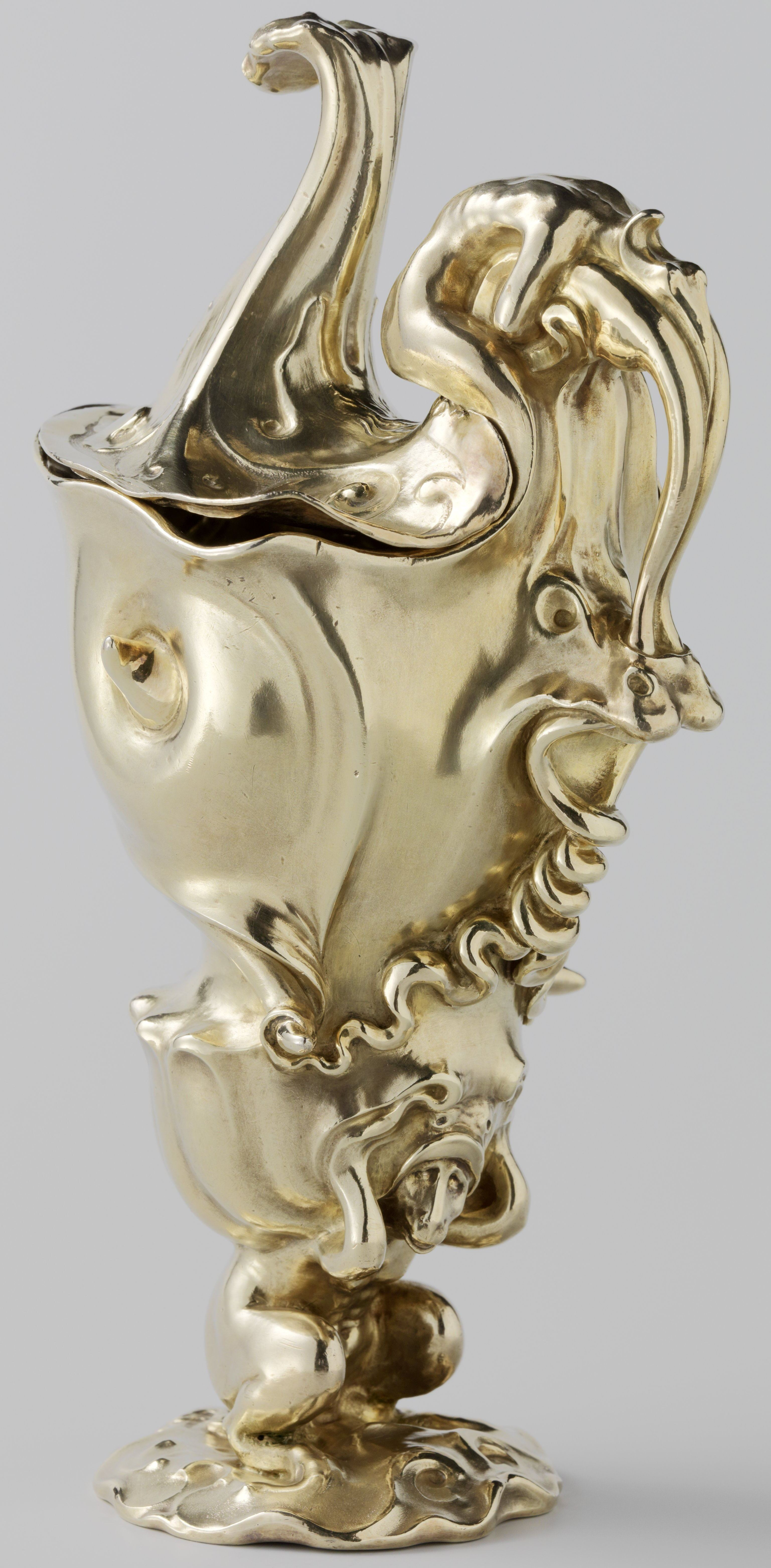
Silver-gilt ewer by Adam van Vianen

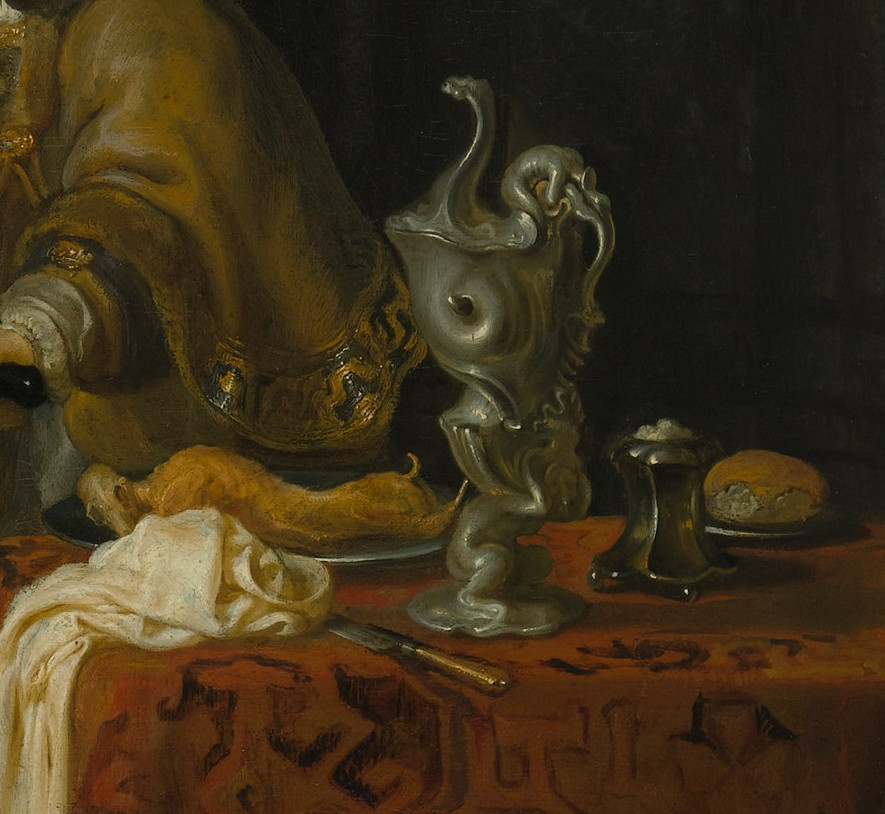
Detail of the ewer in Isaac Blessing Jacob

Van Eeckhout is also known for using the cup again, in at least four other paintings:

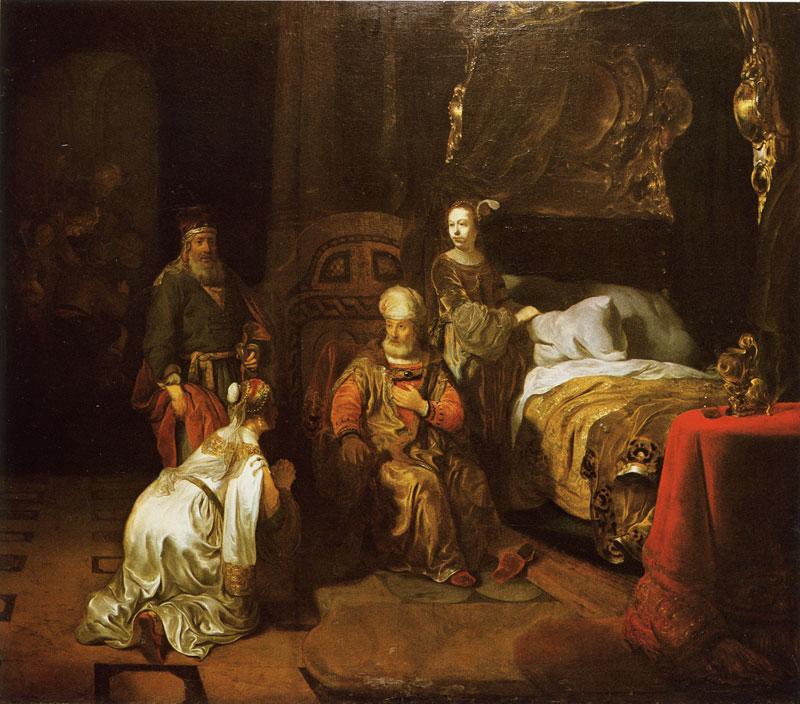
David Promises Bathsheba that Solomon will be his Successor, 1646

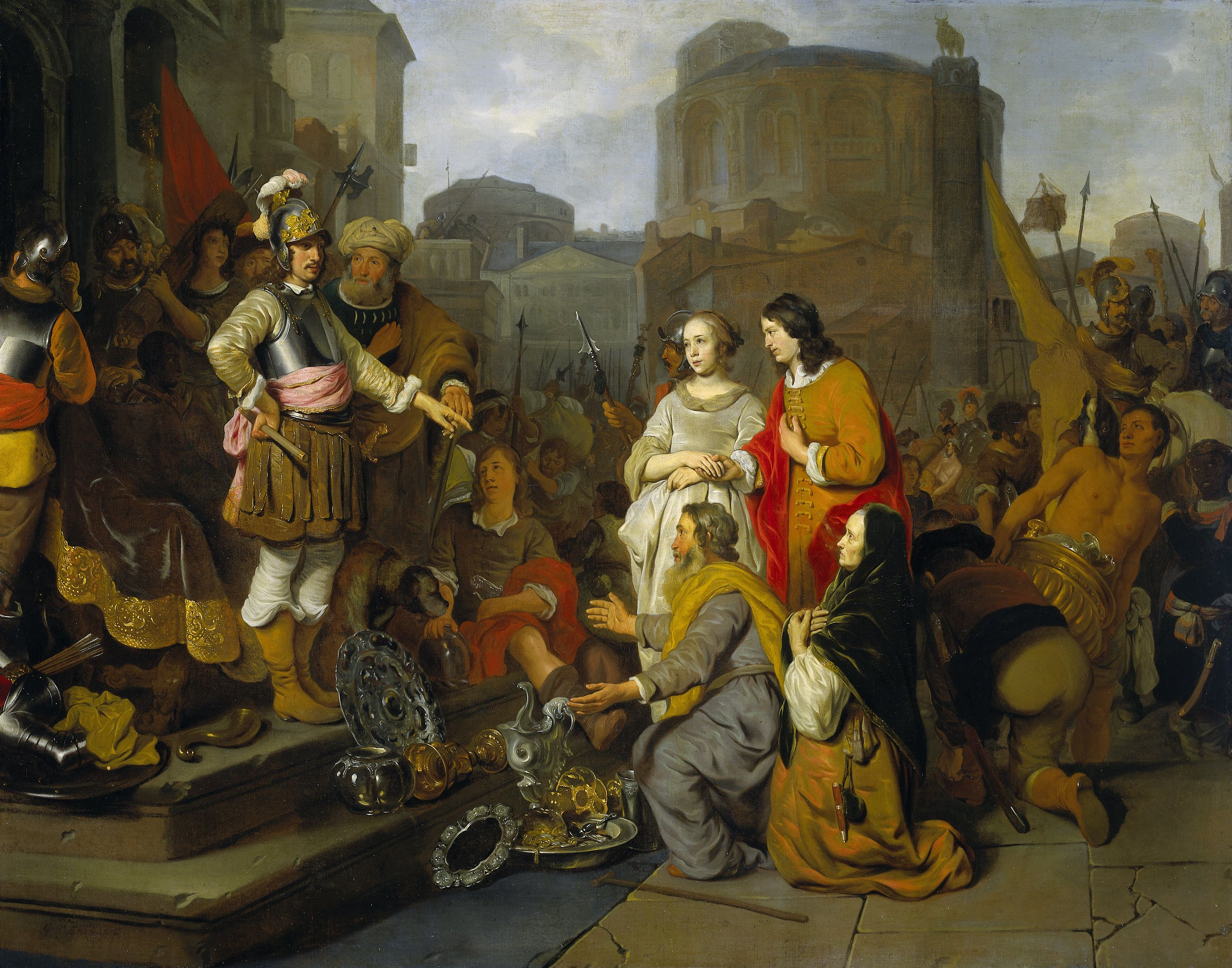
The Continence of Scipio, ca. 1650-55

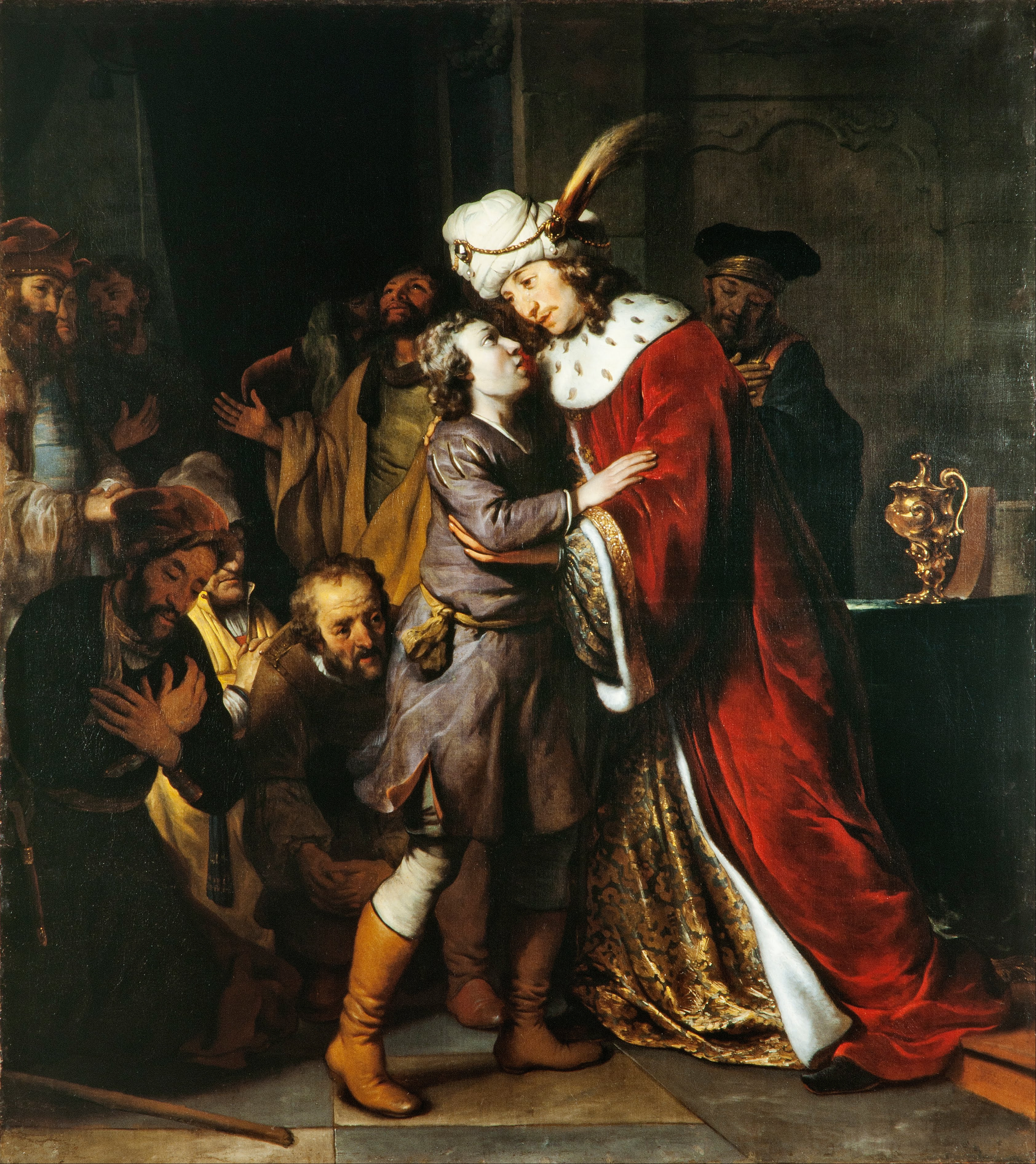
Joseph and His Brothers, 1657

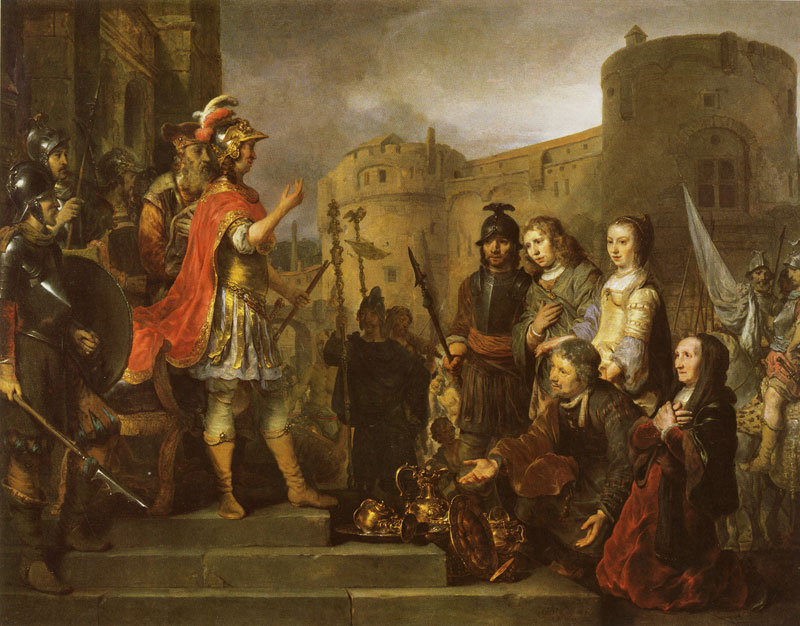
The Continence of Scipio, 1658
