= Memorial Guild Cup (Adam van Vianen) =

1614 ewer by Adam van Vianen

- Covered guild beaker
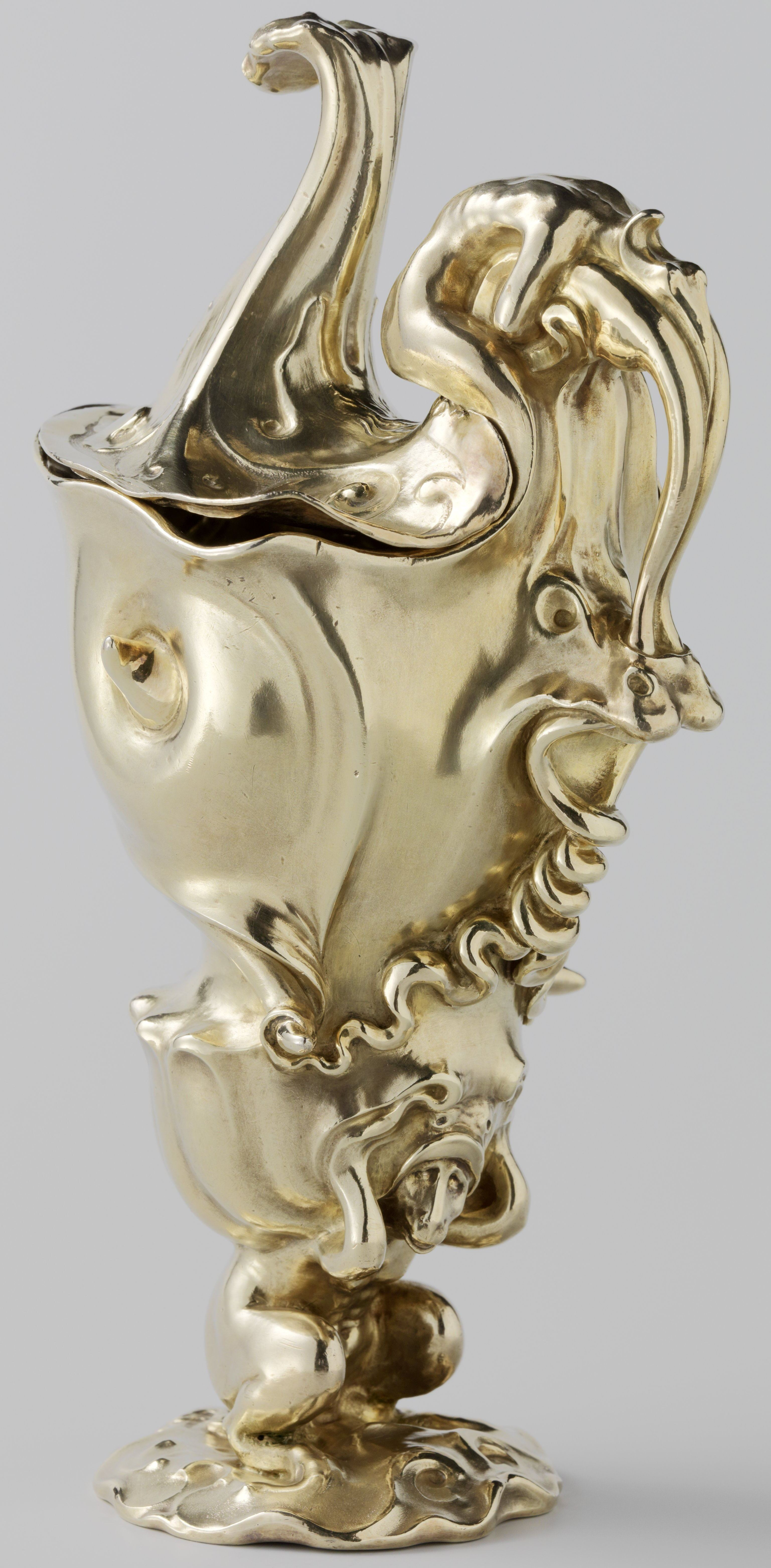
- Artist: Adam van Vianen
- Year: 1614
- Dimensions: 25 cm (9.8 in) × 14 cm (5.5 in) × 9 cm (3.5 in)
- Location: Rijksmuseum
- Identifiers: RKDimages ID: 246503

The Memorial Guild Cup by Adam van Vianen is a 1614 silver-gilt covered ewer in the Rijksmuseum, commissioned by the Amsterdam goldsmiths' guild to commemorate the death of Adam's brother Paulus van Vianen. It is an iconic symbol of the auricular style developed by the two brothers.

It has been described as "a strikingly original work that is largely abstract and completely sculptural in its conception", and quickly became famous, appearing in several Dutch Golden Age paintings, both still lifes and history paintings, "no doubt in part because its bizarre form allowed it to pass as an object from an ancient and foreign land", and so useful for Old Testament scenes and the like. It is unknown why the Amsterdam guild commissioned the ewer, as neither brother lived in Amsterdam or was a member of the guild. A number of leading examples are shown below.

According to James Trilling, it "is one of the very few ornamental works that deserve recognition as art-historical turning points. Van Vianen's breakthrough was the introduction of inchoate or indeterminate form, which paved the way for both Rococo and modernist ornament." It was raised by a lengthy process of chasing from a single sheet of silver, and chasing was the main technique used in auricular silver.

Parts of the decoration form definite forms, the ewer rests on a crouching monkey, and the handle begins as the hair of a woman bent forward. But the woman's legs slide away under the swirling forms of the top of the cover, and the handle terminates as a protuberance from the nose of a monster.

In the same year, van Vianen made a ewer and basin for the City Corporation of Amsterdam in a far more conventional style, though with elements of auricular decoration. These are also in the Rijksmuseum.

== History ==
It seems to have been made in silver and gilded at some later point. It quickly became very famous. It was kept on display in the guild for centuries and featured in many important paintings of the 17th-century. In 1675 Joachim von Sandrart wrote the following about it in his Teutsche Academie: "Pouring ewer with the lid about 1 1/2 hands high, of one piece of silver, the whole in so-called Grotesque or "Schnackerey" style, is considered a rare-wonder piece".

During the French occupation after 1794, the guilds were disbanded and the collection was dispersed. In 1821 the cup was sold for 166 guilders and it came into the hands of a collection in Scotland. It came up for auction in 1976 and the Rijksmuseum purchased it for 700,000 guilders with support from the Vereniging Rembrandt. At the time, it was the highest price ever paid for a piece of silver in the Netherlands. The reason had to do with the number of times the ewer was featured in prominent paintings of the 17th century. A selection of these are:

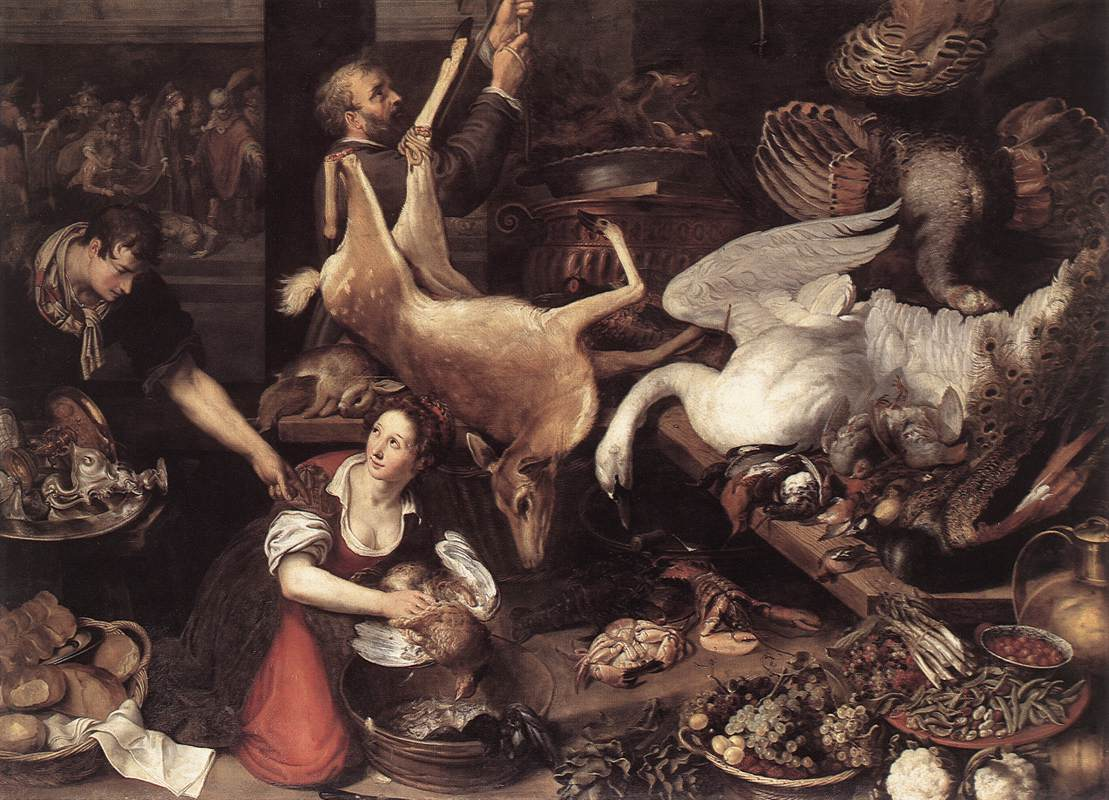
Kitchen Scene (1616) by Adriaen van Nieulandt the younger

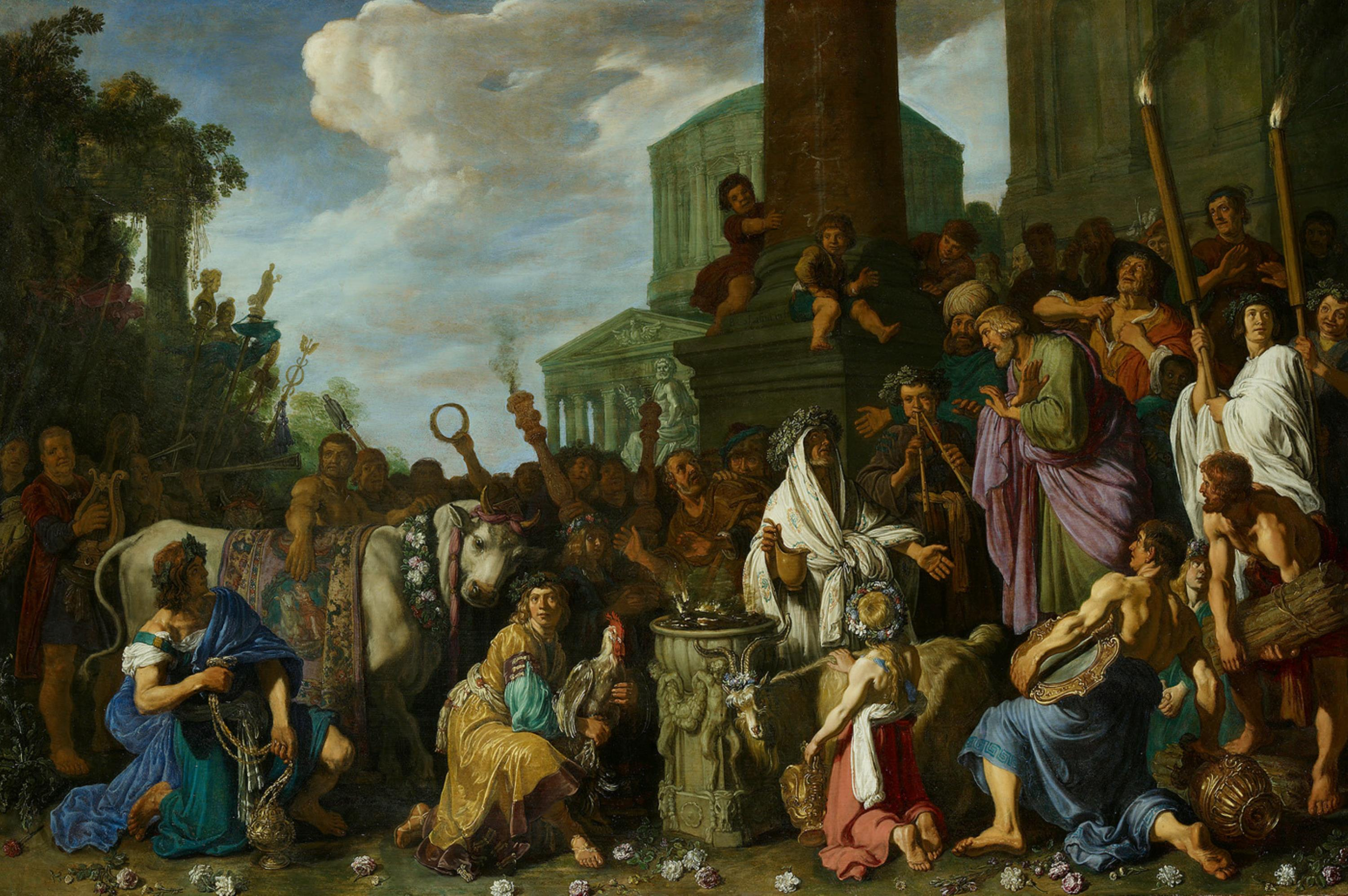
Paul and Barnabas at Lystra (1617) by Pieter Lastman

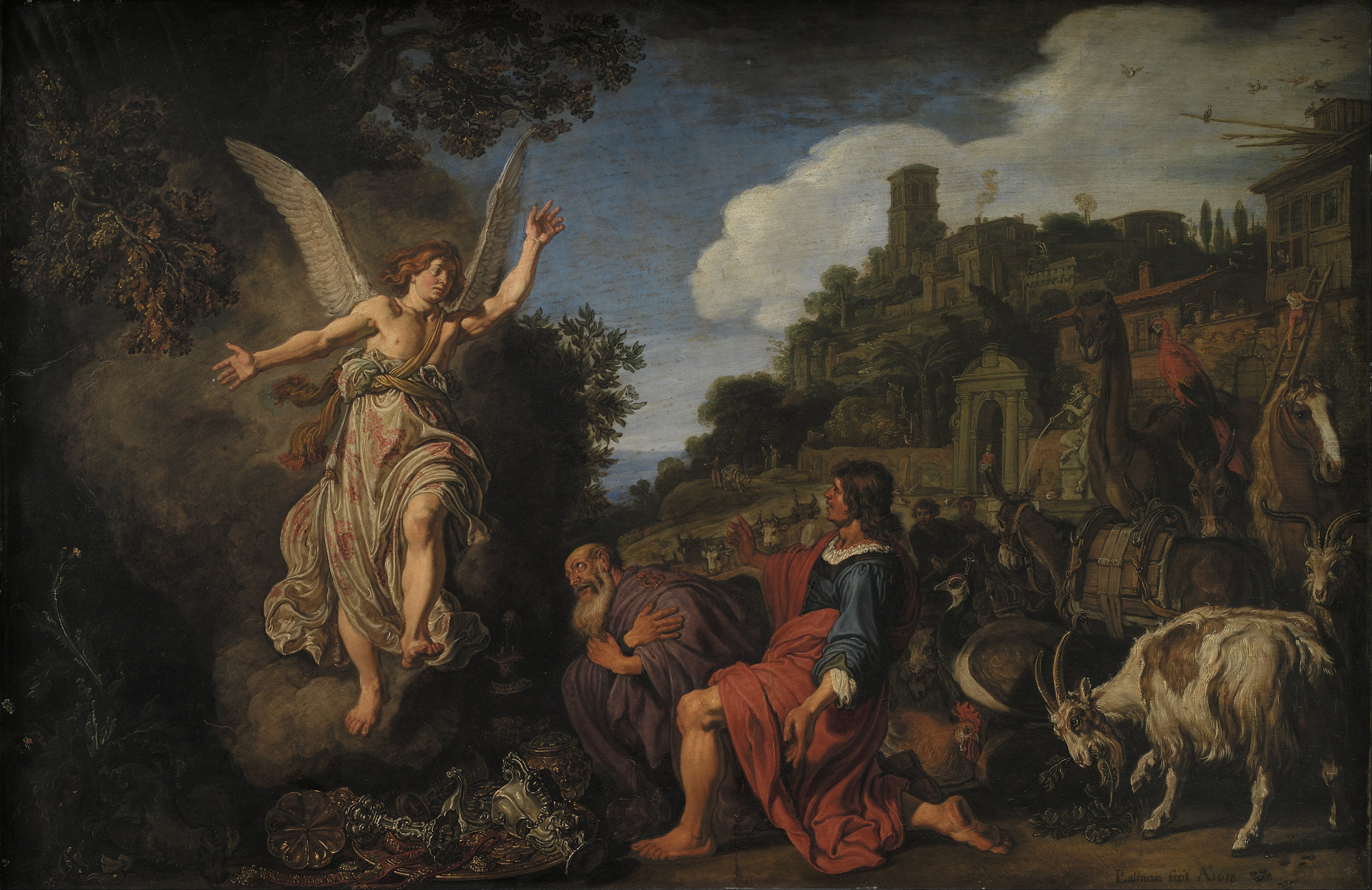
The Angel Raphael Takes Leave of Old Tobit and his Son Tobias (1618) by Pieter Lastman

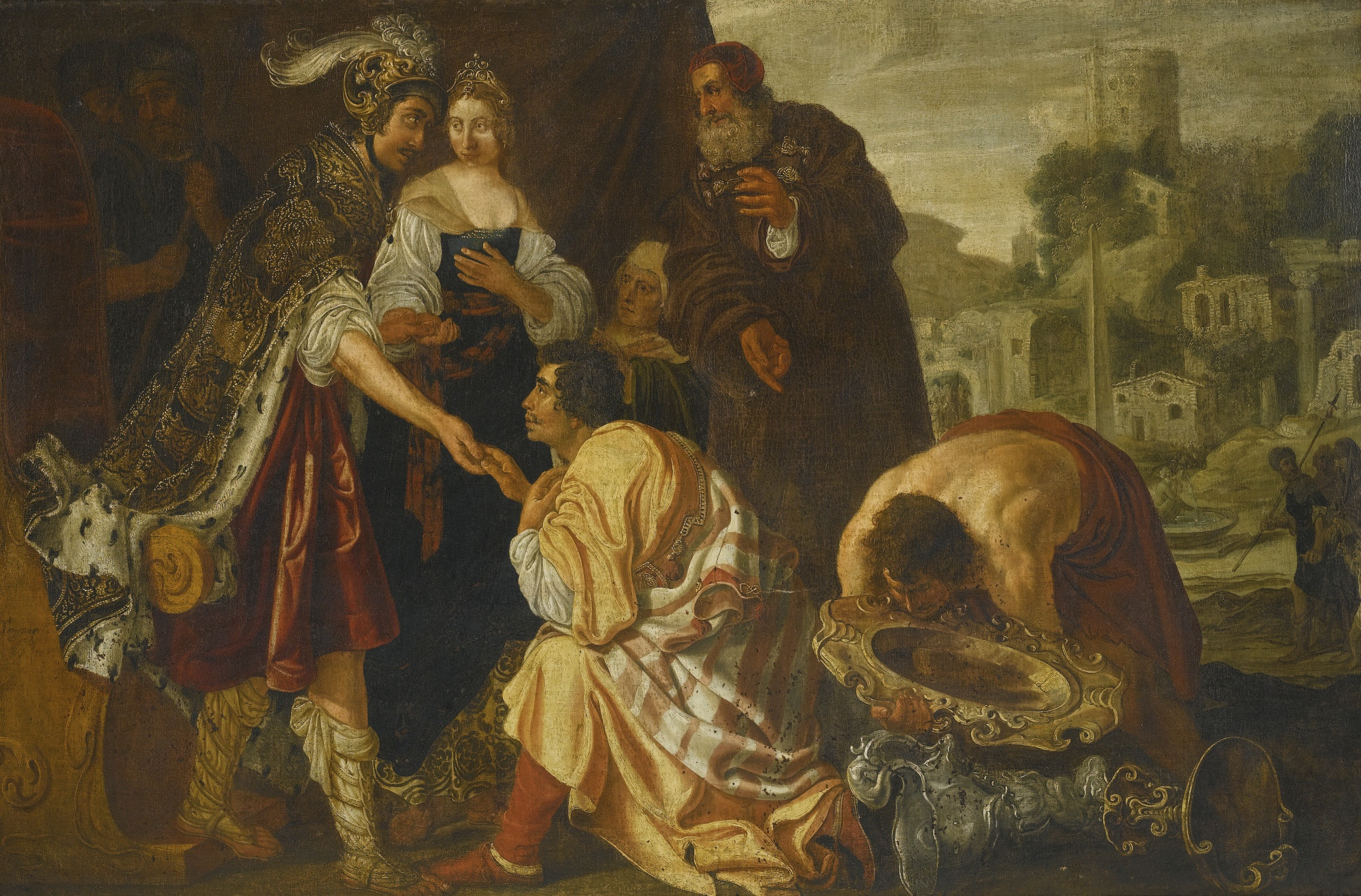
The Continence of Scipio (1614–1619) by Jan Tengnagel

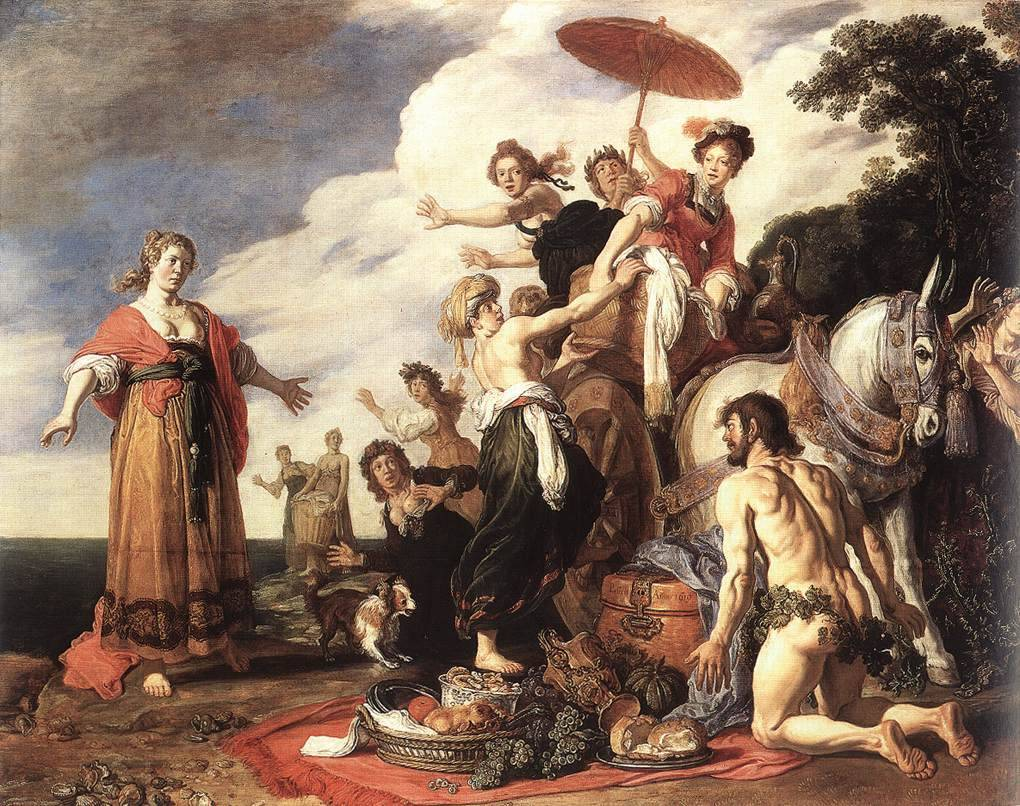
Odysseus and Nausicaa (1619) by Pieter Lastman

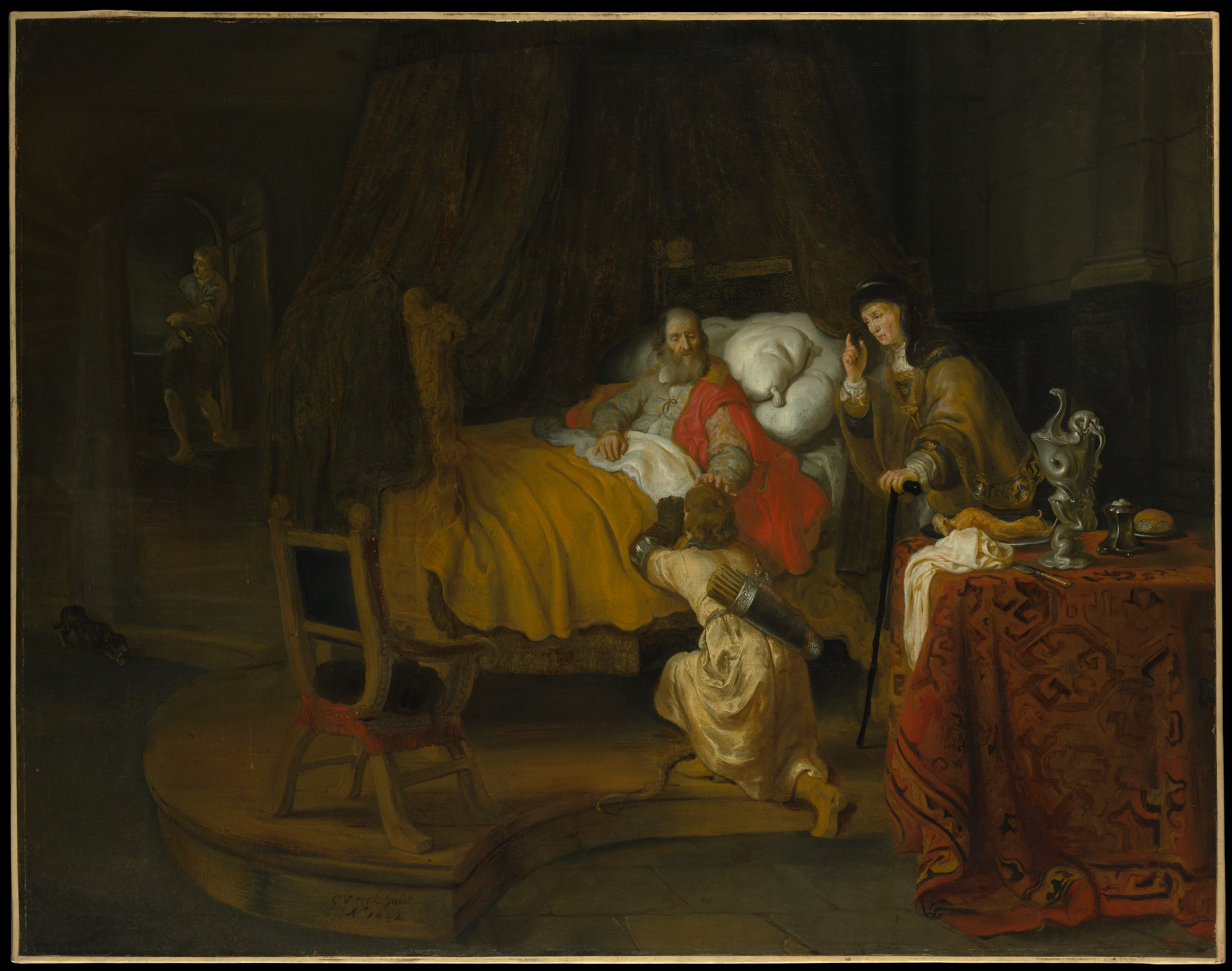
Isaac Blessing Jacob (1642) by Gerbrand van den Eeckhout

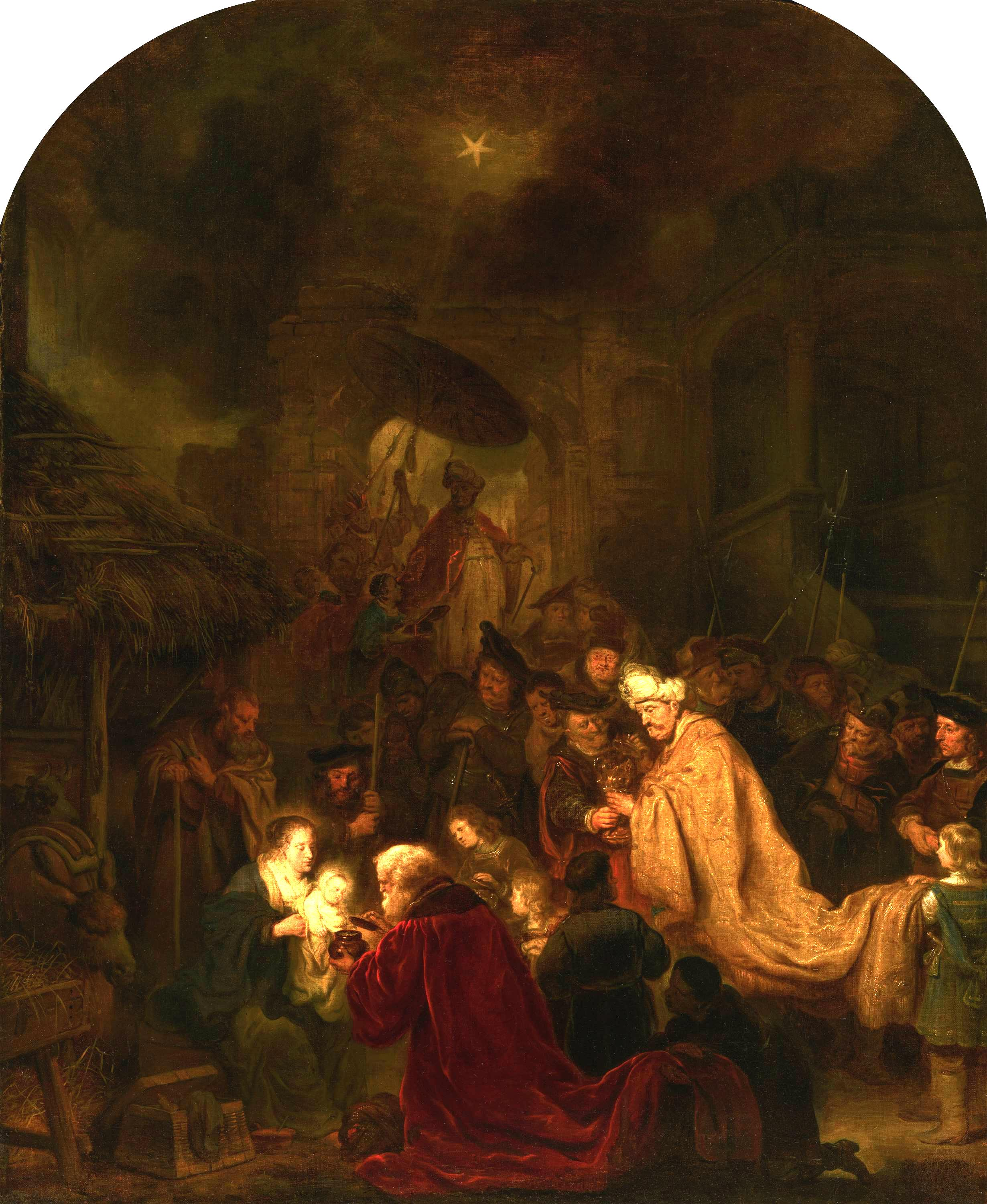
The Adoration of the Magi (1650) by Salomon Koninck

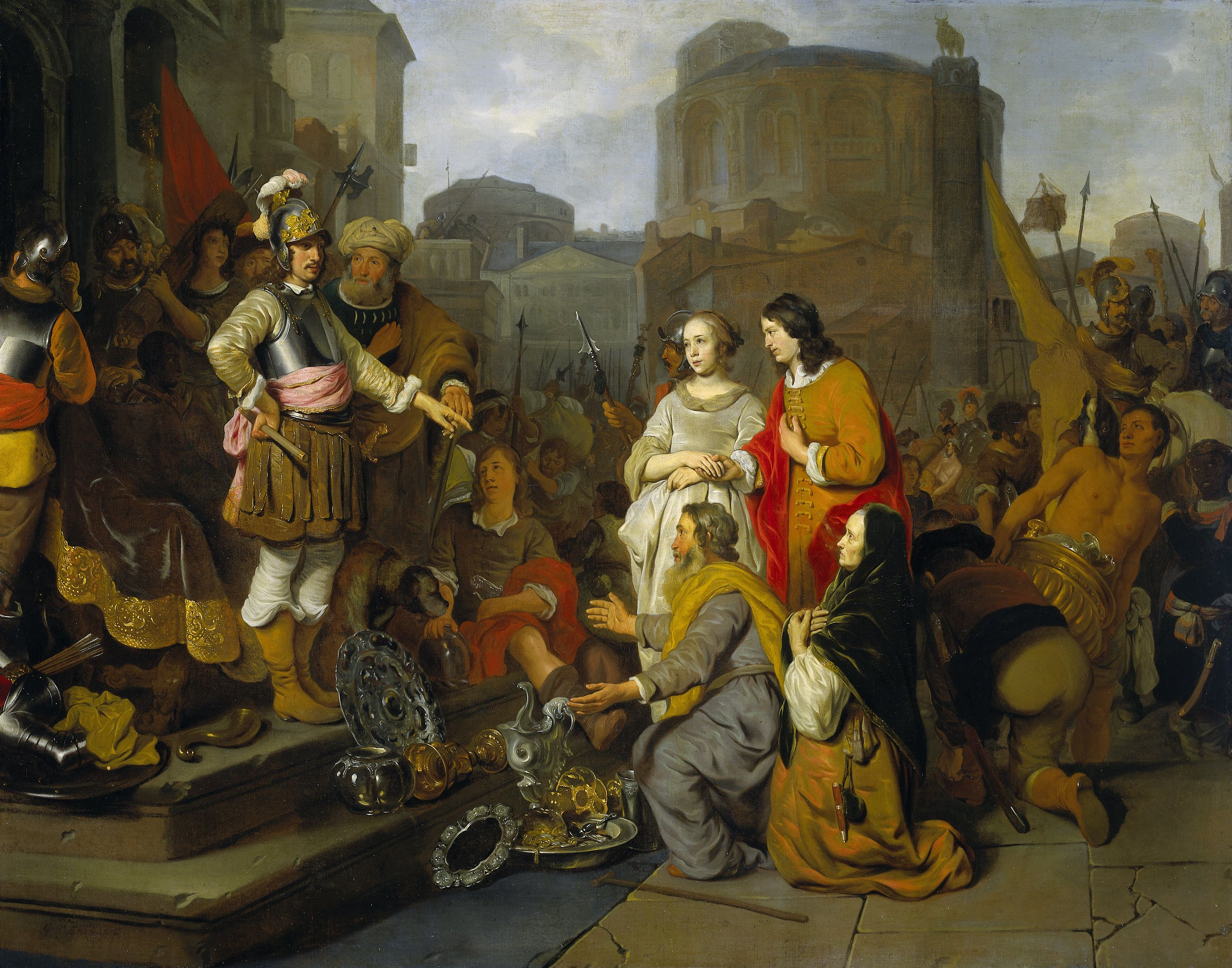
The Continence of Scipio (1653) by Gerbrand van den Eeckhout

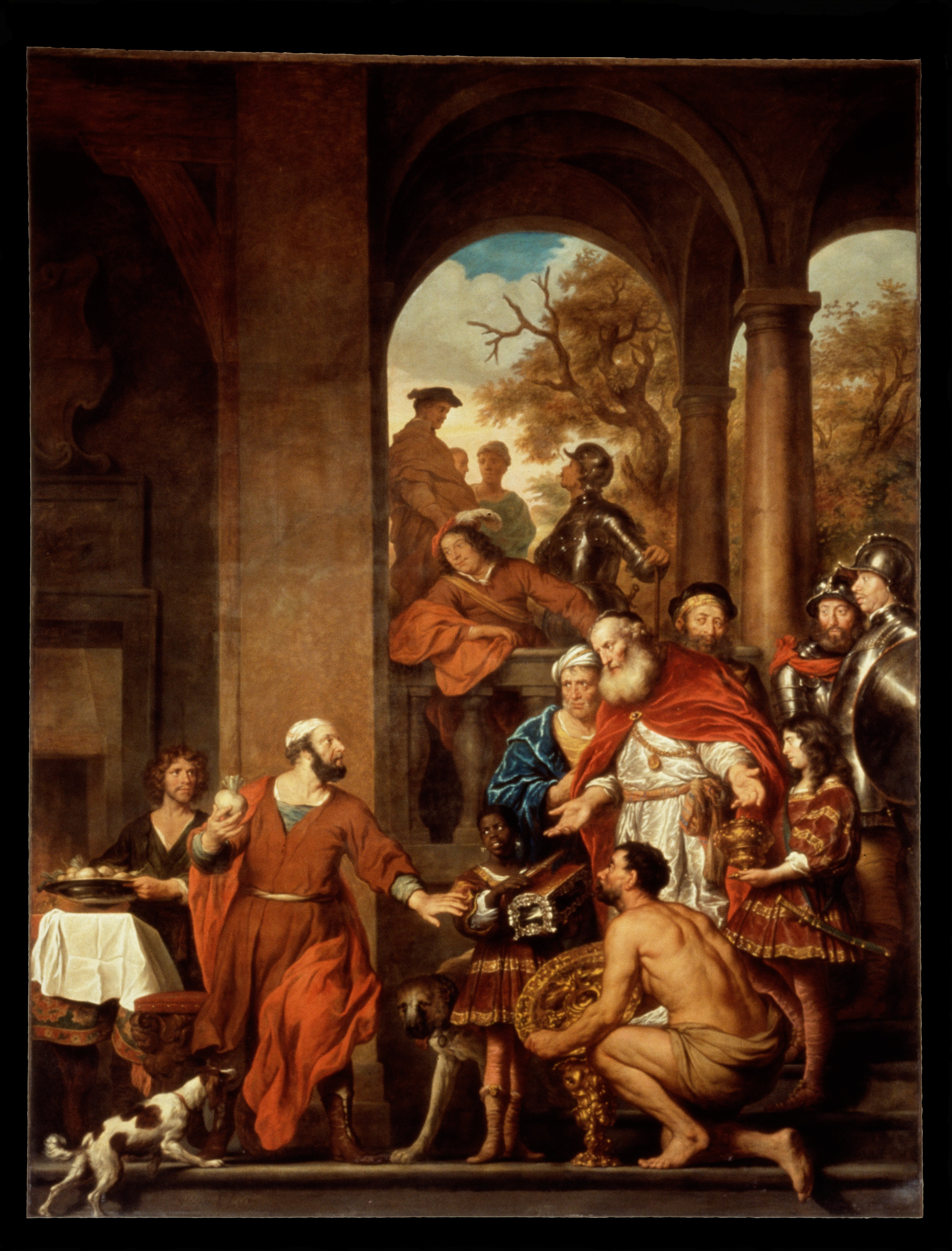
Marcus Curius Dentatus refuses the gifts of the Samnites (1656) by Govert Flinck

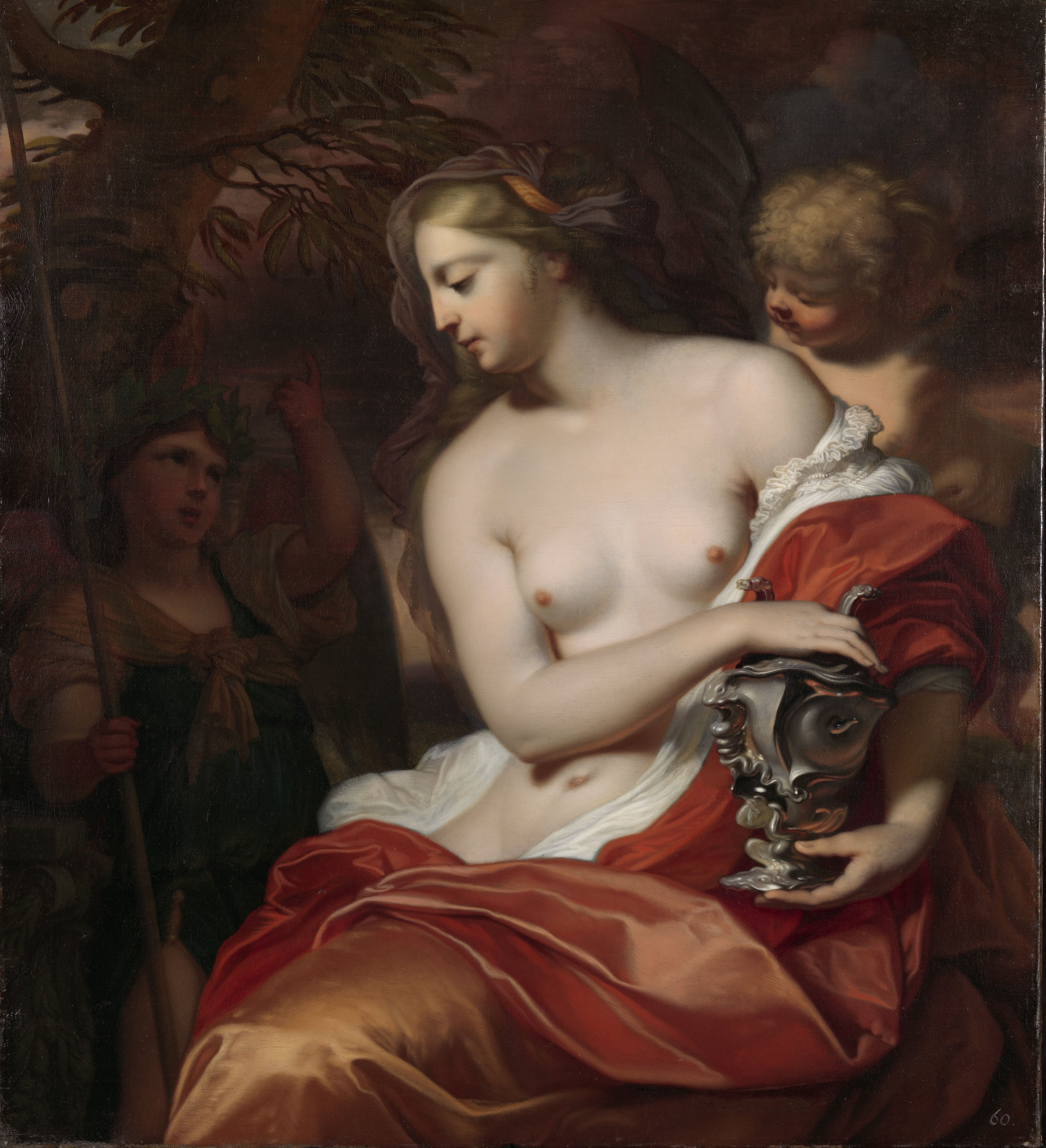
Pandora (1676) by Barend Graat
