= Adoration of the Magi (Salomon Koninck) =

Painting by Salomon Koninck

The Adoration of the Magi
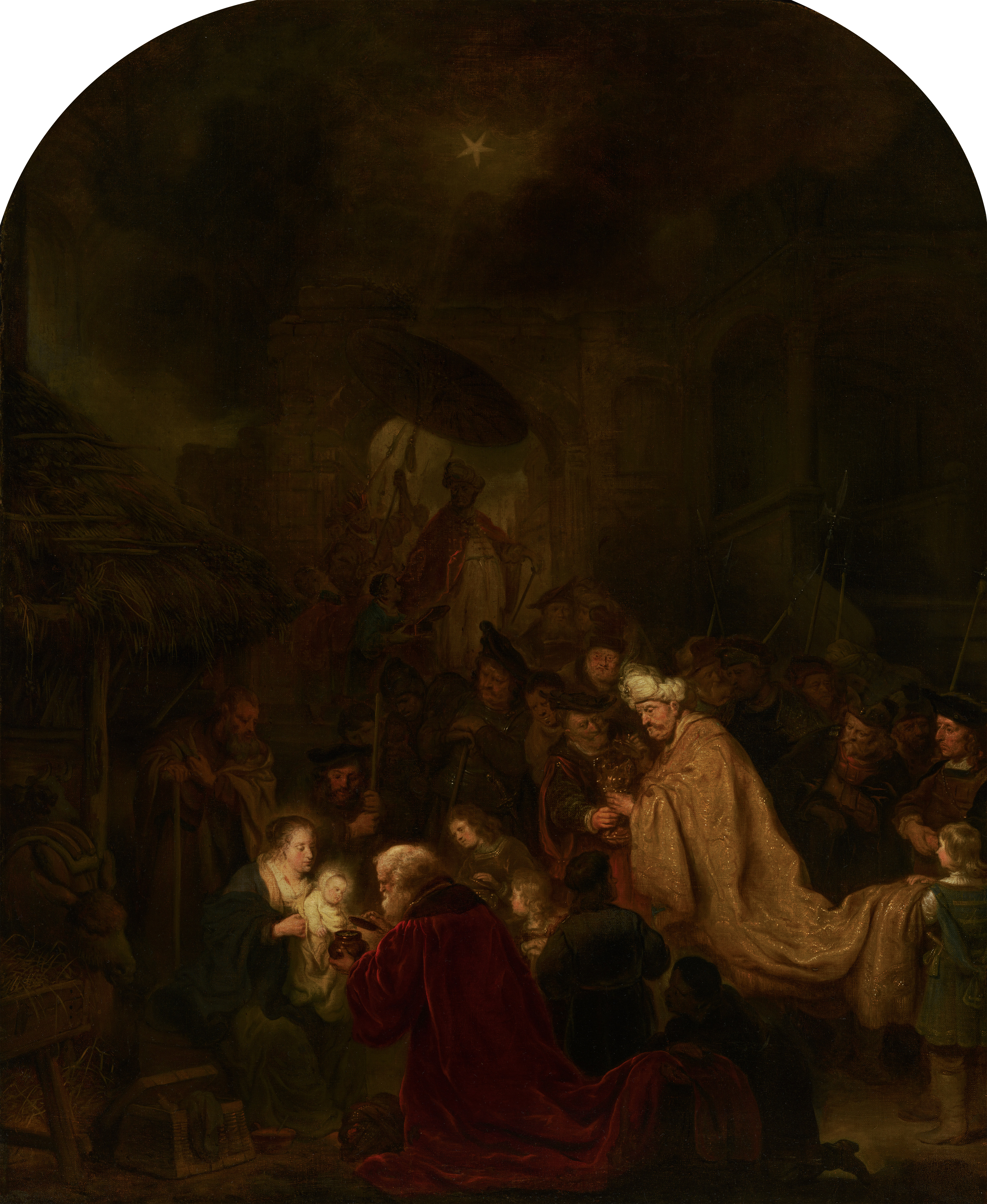
- Artist: Salomon Koninck
- Year: 1644–1646
- Medium: oil paint, canvas
- Subject: adoration of the Magi
- Dimensions: 81 cm (32 in) × 66 cm (26 in)
- Location: Mauritshuis
- Accession: 36

The Adoration of the Magi (Dutch: Aanbidding der wijzen), is a circa 1645 oil on panel painting of the Nativity by the Dutch artist Salomon Koninck in the collection of the Mauritshuis in The Hague.

== Painting ==
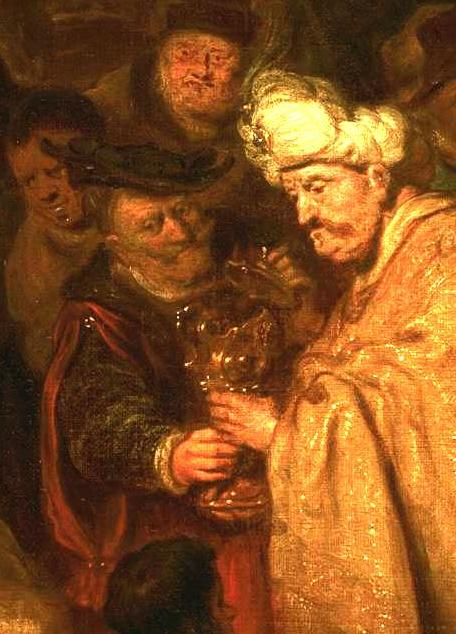
Caspar holding the Amsterdam Guild cup

The Adoration of the Magi shows a nocturnal scene with Mary bending over the Child while the gifts of gold, frankincense and myrrh are presented by the three kings Melchior, Caspar and Balthazar with their entourages in procession. The robes of Melchior and Caspar are held by boys, continuing an Antwerp pictorial tradition started by Peter Paul Rubens. Caspar is holding the famous Amsterdam guild cup, which both reveals the Amsterdam origins of the painting and also raises the question if the other metal objects presented were equally famous. According to the museum, the painting's provenance goes back only as far as the heirs of Joan de Vries of Amsterdam in 1708. Behind and above them, centrally placed in the composition, is the magi Balthazar, standing under a parasol with the star of Bethlehem shining above him.

The painting was painted soon after the time when Koninck was a pupil of Rembrandt. Many aspects of the fashions and poses in the composition are taken directly from earlier Rembrandt paintings, such as his 1634 version of the same subject, now in the Hermitage:

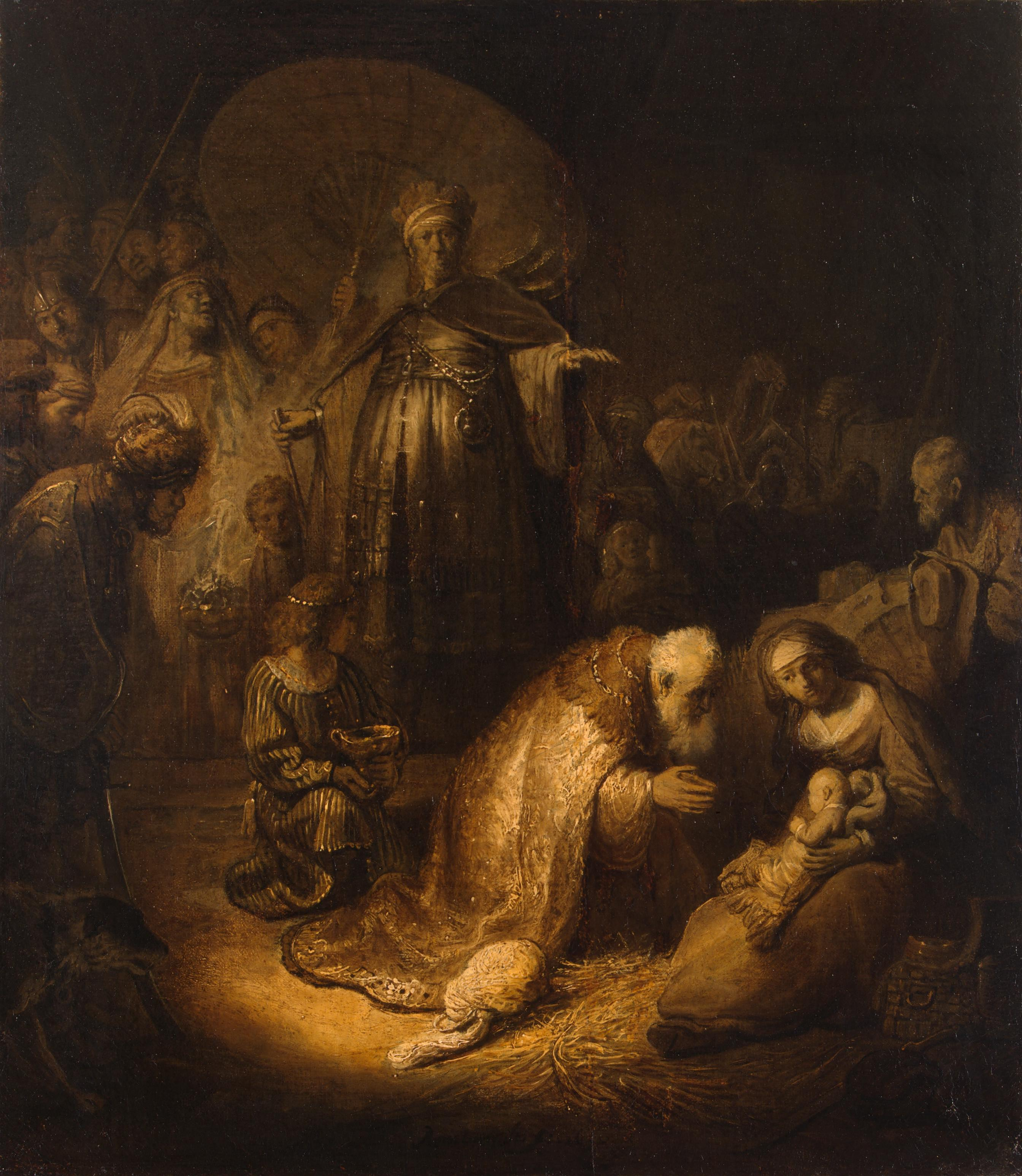
The Adoration of the Magi, 1634, by Rembrandt

== Provenance ==
This painting was once in the collection of William V, Prince of Orange and was purchased by him in The Hague in 1762 as by another Rembrandt pupil, Gerbrand van den Eeckhout. It was claimed by the French in 1795 and displayed at the Louvre during the French occupation. It was returned to the museum in 1815.
