= Marcus Curius Dentatus refuses the gifts of the Samnites =

1656 painting by Govert Flinck

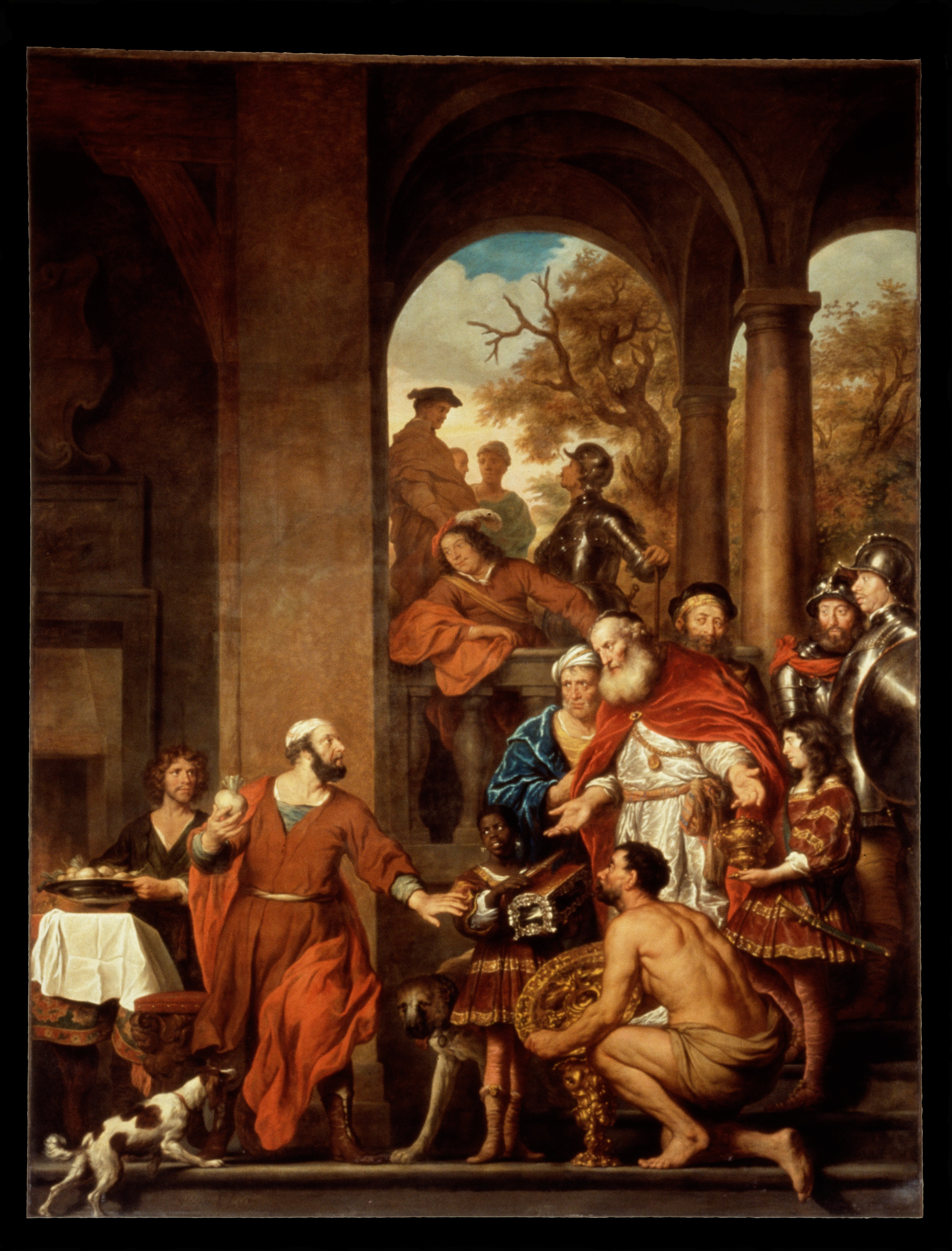
- Artist: Govert Flinck
- Year: 1656
- Medium: oil paint, canvas
- Dimensions: 4,850 mm (191 in) × 3,770 mm (148 in)

Marcus (sic: Manius) Curius Dentatus refuses the gifts of the Samnites is a 1656 painting by Govert Flinck. It shows the Roman consul Marcus Curius Dentatus, preferring turnips to an offer of gold and silver objects, including the Memorial Guild Cup by Adam van Vianen. It hangs in the same spot for which it was painted, in the former mayors' rooms of the Royal Palace of Amsterdam.

== The commission ==
Govert Flinck created this painting as a pendant to Ferdinand Bol's 1656 painting of Pyrrhus showing Gaius Fabricius the elephant. It was probably the result of a competition in scenes of good government for the new city hall of Amsterdam. Both paintings were a success, considering they have remained in place through the centuries, despite the building being repurposed to become a palace residence for Louis Bonaparte during the French occupation. Flinck also seems to have beat Bol in the artistic handling of his subject, as he was subsequently awarded the commission to paint the lunettes of the galleries after this painting was completed. Unfortunately he only completed one of these before his unexpected death in 1660.

== Description ==
The painting appears to be based on popular comparisons of current events to historical heroism, though too little is known of the paintings previously located in the old Amsterdam Town Hall before it burned down in 1652 to be able to say whether the subjects were painted before. This painting shows a servant about to set a platter of roasted turnips on a table, while Dentatus turns around with a dismissive gesture. His dog approaches as if to see what the fuss is about, while a group of 12 figures seem surprised at the disinterest of Dentatus. The half-naked servant on the lower right holds a large platter above the Vianen ewer. The ewer was painted multiple times, but this is the largest painting that features it, and its position in the painting is at about eye-level, just above a poem relating the story told by the painting. It hangs above the mantelpiece in the mayor's room.

Several paintings of the same subject were painted after this one, so it is odd that in his catalog of paintings by Jan Steen, the art historian Hofstede de Groot in 1908 called Steen's version "The Roman Envoys inviting Cincinnatus to take command of the Army"

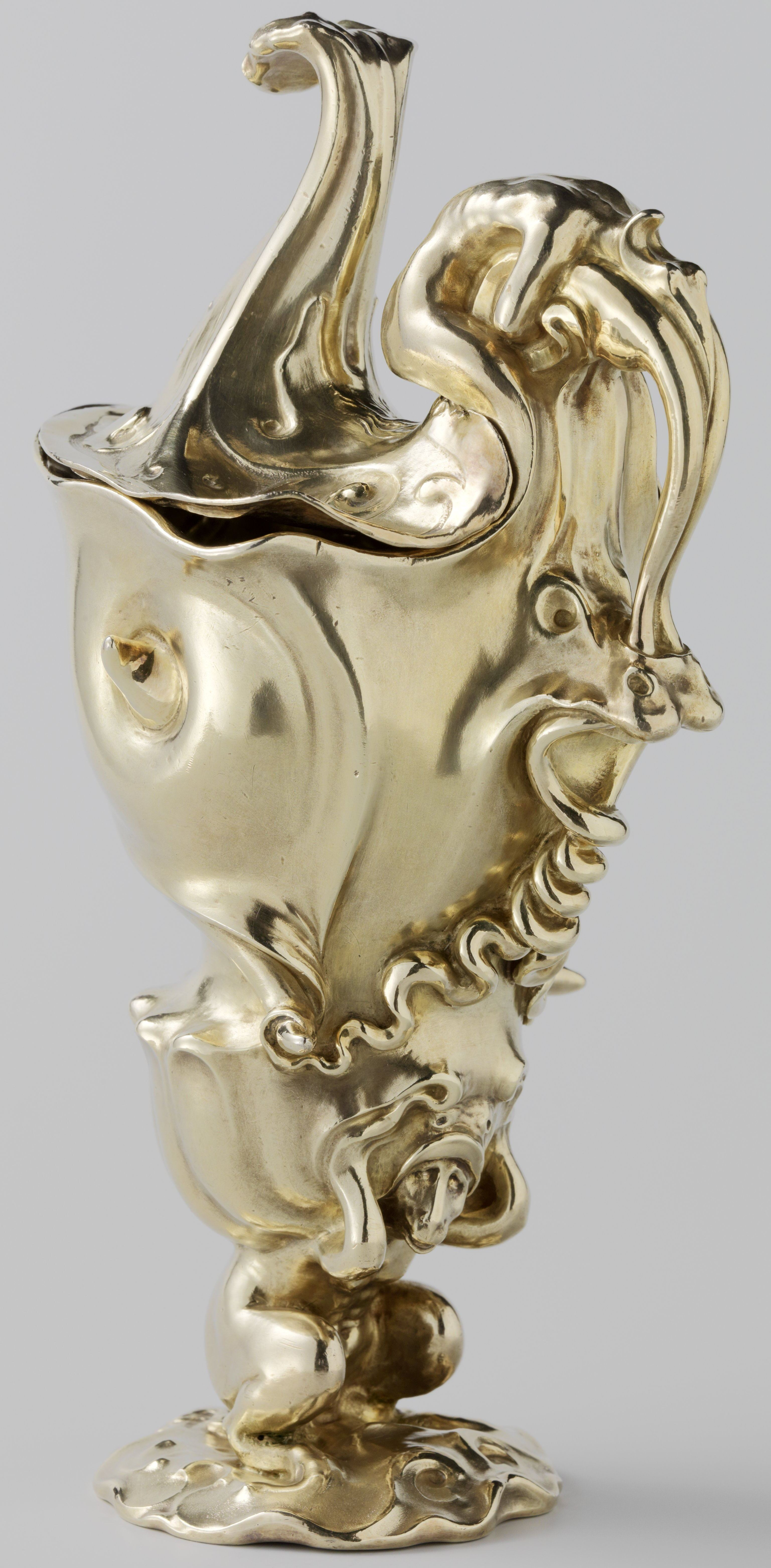
Adam van Vianen's ewer

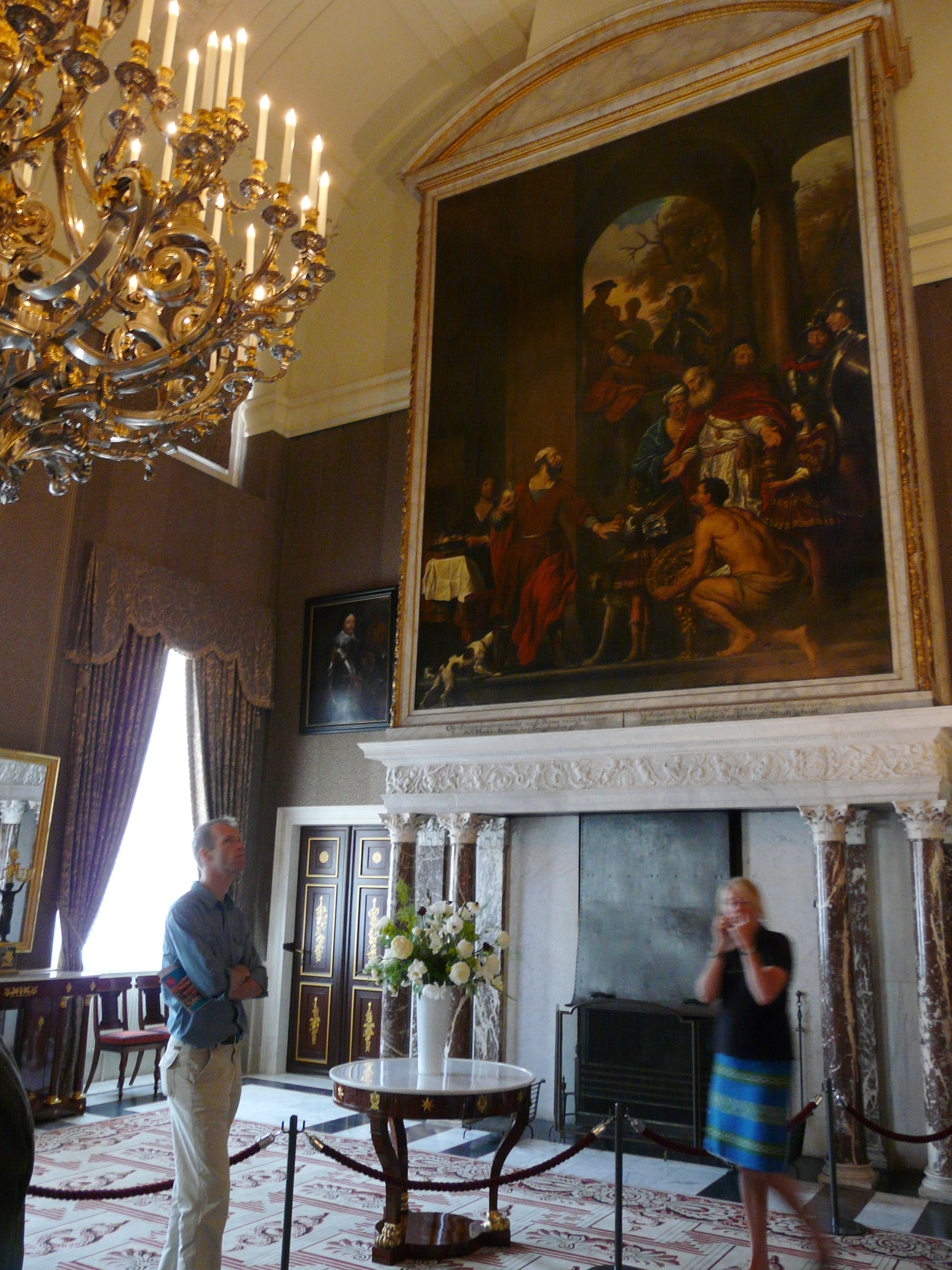
The painting in the former mayor's room

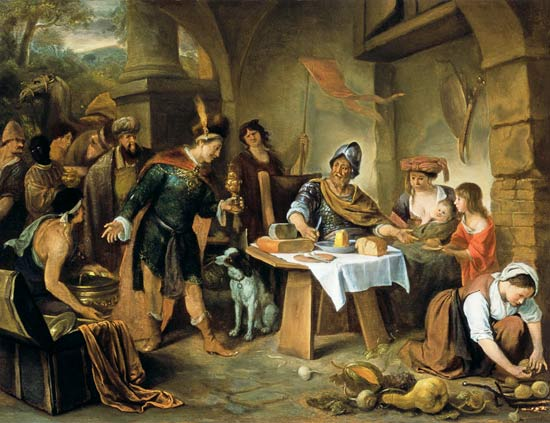
Jan Steen's version of c. 1670

== See also ==
- Samnites
