= Self-Portrait with Dishevelled Hair =

1628 painting by Rembrandt

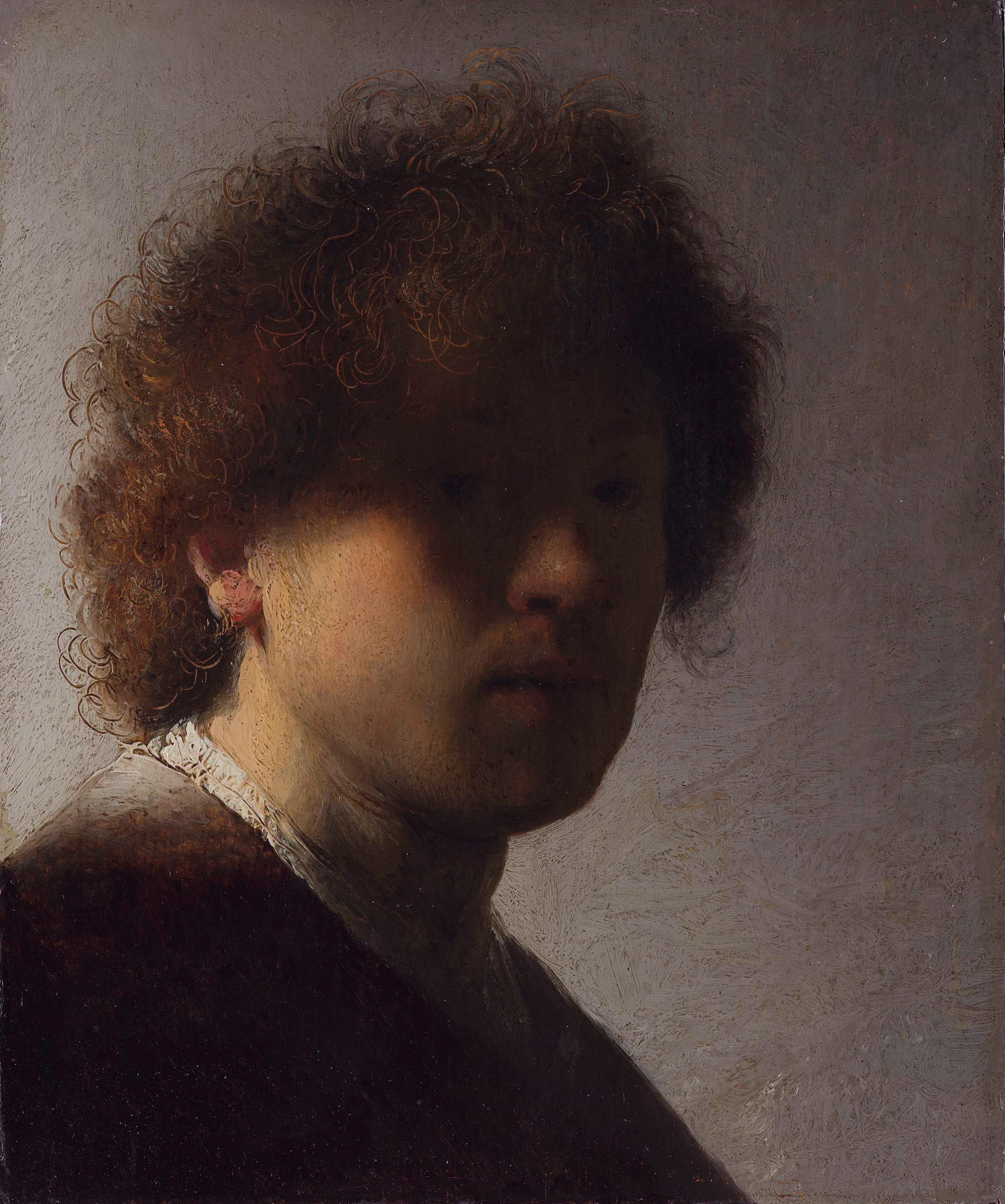
- Artist: Rembrandt
- Year: 1628
- Medium: Oil on Oak Wood
- Movement: Baroque
- Dimensions: 22.6 cm × 18.7 cm (8.9 in × 7.4 in)
- Location: Rijksmuseum, Amsterdam
- Accession: SK-A-4691

Self-Portrait with Dishevelled Hair, also known as Self-Portrait at an Early Age, is an early self-portrait by the Dutch Golden Age artist Rembrandt. The painting has been in the Rijksmuseum Amsterdam collection since 1960, and is an exercise in chiaroscuro. It is one of the earliest of over forty painted self-portraits by Rembrandt, there is a copy in the collection of the National Trust which was created by his workshop.

== Context ==
No painter of the 17th century is known to have more self-portraits than Rembrandt. He made 40 self-portraits in paint, 31 etchings and dozens more drawings of himself; not including the numerous times he featured himself in Bible and history paintings. This self-portrait is the earliest known of Rembrandt. Many of Rembrandt's self-portraits, especially his etchings and drawings, bear the character of studies. They are often tronies with which he tried out facial expressions, which he later used in larger works. Especially where difficult expressions were concerned, he could endlessly study his facial expressions in the mirror. The painting discussed here also clearly carries elements of a study.

== Painting ==
Self-portrait at an early age shows the artist in a relaxed state. With that, the portrait is clearly not a tronie, focused on the study of faces. Rembrandt, early in artistic development, concentrates mainly on the effect of light and how it falls on various materials, including the skin and the wall; practising the technique of chiaroscuro. The eyes, surely the most prominent part of the face, and the forehead, fall completely into shadow. At first, it is hardly noticeable that the painter is looking the viewer directly in the eyes.

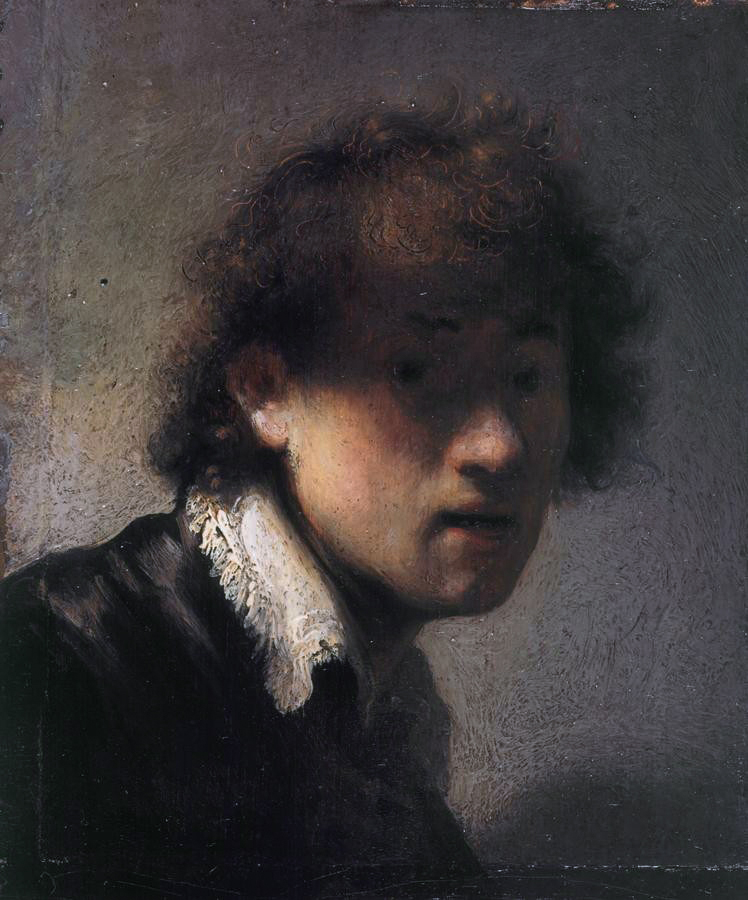
A similar, later self-portrait, c. 1629, where Rembrandt appears in a more lightly lit setting. One use of Rembrandt lighting.

The angle of lighting in the work is far from usual. The figure leaning to the left is illuminated from behind by a strong flood light. The light shines only on part of the shoulder, the neck, the right ear and the jaw, and through the cheek a little more on mouth and on the tip of the nose. The paint treatment is varied, according to the strength of the light. With thick pasty paint, he depicts the spot where the light first hits him, at the neck, where the sheen of his coat is almost as white as his collar. The neck and earlobe are also painted with thick pasty paint. More towards the shadow, however, the paint surface becomes thinner. The highlight on the nose, which is further away from the light source, is the least pasty. The texture of the paint is also more refined there. The transparent way in which Rembrandt works out the light on his curly hair is striking. To occasionally lift a hair, he uses the back of his brush, scratching the still-wet paint with it. Equally unusual is his attention to the largely backlit wall in the background: the texture of the paint is used to suggest a plastered wall, which he elaborates with short pasty touches, sometimes almost revealing the light background. The surface is covered with a variety of paint textures, with which Rembrandt approaches reality with great accuracy and, at only twenty-two years old, already shows his extraordinary technical skill.

A year after the completion of this work, in 1629, Rembrandt painted another similar self-portrait, the face slightly differently lit, now belonging to the collection of the Alte Pinakothek in Munich.

== Provenance ==
On 27 May 1959, it was sold in London through the auction house Sotheby's to the art dealer Daan H. Cevat for 1,700 British pounds. In 1960, it was given on loan to the Rijksmuseum Amsterdam and bought by the same museum in 1977 for 1.8 million guilders, with support from the Rembrandt Foundation, the Foundation for the Advancement of the Interests of the Rijksmuseum, the Prince Bernhard Fund, the Photo Sales Committee and the Ministry of Culture, Recreation and Social Work.

== See also ==
- Self-portraits by Rembrandt
- List of paintings by Rembrandt
