= Vereniging Rembrandt =

Dutch foundation

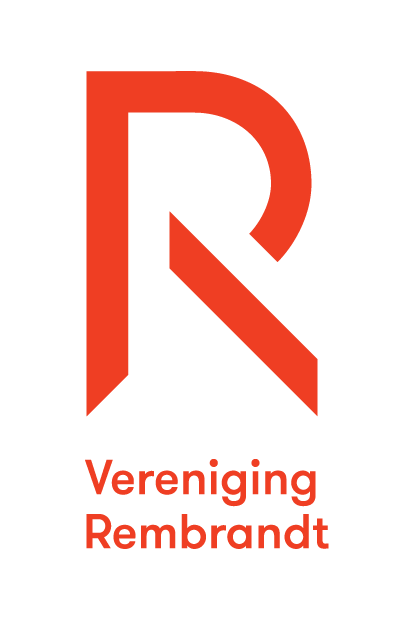
Logo of the Vereniging Rembrandt

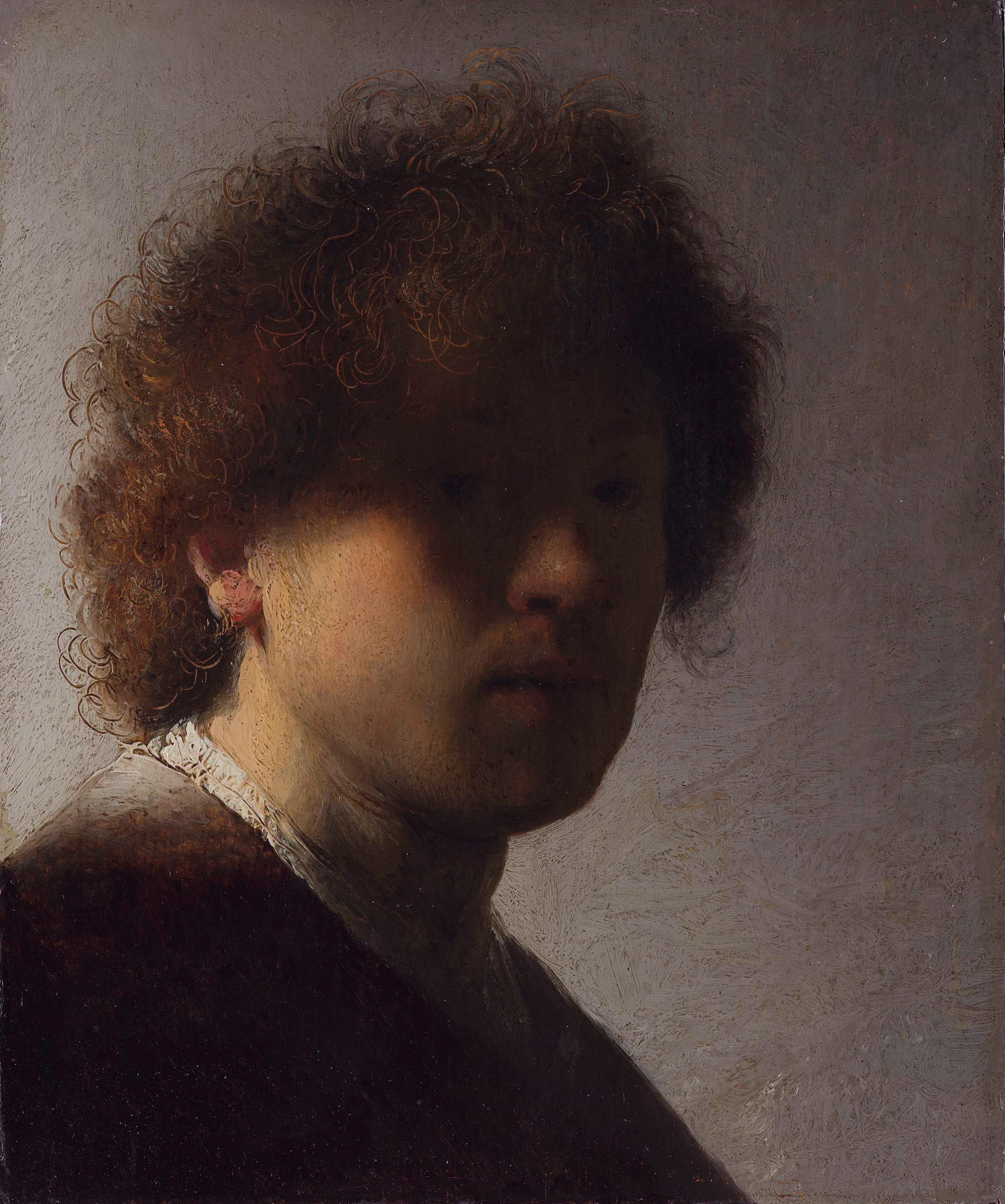
Self-Portrait with Dishevelled Hair (Rijksmuseum) is one of several works by Rembrandt bought for Dutch museums with assistance from the Vereniging Rembrandt.

Vereniging Rembrandt (Rembrandt Association) is a Dutch association of art patrons who raise funds to assist Dutch museums and art galleries in purchasing artworks. Since it was founded in 1883, it has helped purchase over two thousand works, including Vermeer's The Milkmaid.

== History ==
The 19th century saw a major exodus of Dutch art out of the country. In 1883 the 'de Vos' drawings collection came to auction, but remained out of reach of any Dutch museum's budget. A few private individuals in Amsterdam founded the Vereniging before the auction was completed and managed to help keep a large number of major drawings from the collection in the Netherlands. Its initial aims were to fund the conservation of Dutch artworks already in the Netherlands and buying back ones from abroad, though it is no longer limited to works by Rembrandt, and other 17th century Dutch Golden Age painters.

Its current aims include helping to acquire works for public collections in the Netherlands and/or supporting acquisitions by Dutch galleries and museums. Initially the Vereniging only loaned the funds, to be repaid later by the state or by the museum or gallery itself, but later donations were given to purchase works both in the Netherlands and overseas, both Dutch and non-Dutch works. After 1945 it expanded its remit from old masters to modern art and an educational aim was added in 2002.

It began with 250 members, rising to 300 by 1907, 900 by 1983, over 12,650 by the end of 2015 and around 15,700 members by the end of 2018. Museums supported by the Vereniging give free entry to their permanent displays to its members. Its other income streams include donations, bequests, returns on its investments and since 1960 an annual contribution from the Prins Bernhard Cultuurfonds.

== Selected campaigns ==
- 1885 - Provinciaal Museum van Oudheden (now known as the Drents Museum) in Drenthe - helped to buy eight medieval fonts
- 1887 - Rijksmuseum in Amsterdam - helped to purchase a silver drinking-bowl by Adam van Vianen
- 1931 - Museum Boijmans Van Beuningen - The Wayfarer by Hieronymus Bosch
- 1967 - Stedelijk Museum in Amsterdam - Cut-out by Henri Matisse
- 1976 - Rijksmuseum - helped buy a guild cup, again by van Vianen
- 2014 - Rijksmuseum - 4 million Euros to help buy a bronze bacchante by Adriaen de Vries
- 2015 - Rijksmuseum - 5 million Euros to help buy Rembrandt's marriage portraits of Marten Soolmans and Oopjen Coppit, which were ultimately bought jointly by the Rijksmuseum and the Louvre
- 2019-2021 - Rijksmuseum - 15 million Euros to help buy Rembrandt's Standard Bearer
