= The Continence of Scipio (Gerbrand van den Eeckhout) =

Painting by Gerbrand van den Eeckhout

The continence of Scipio
- NK2276
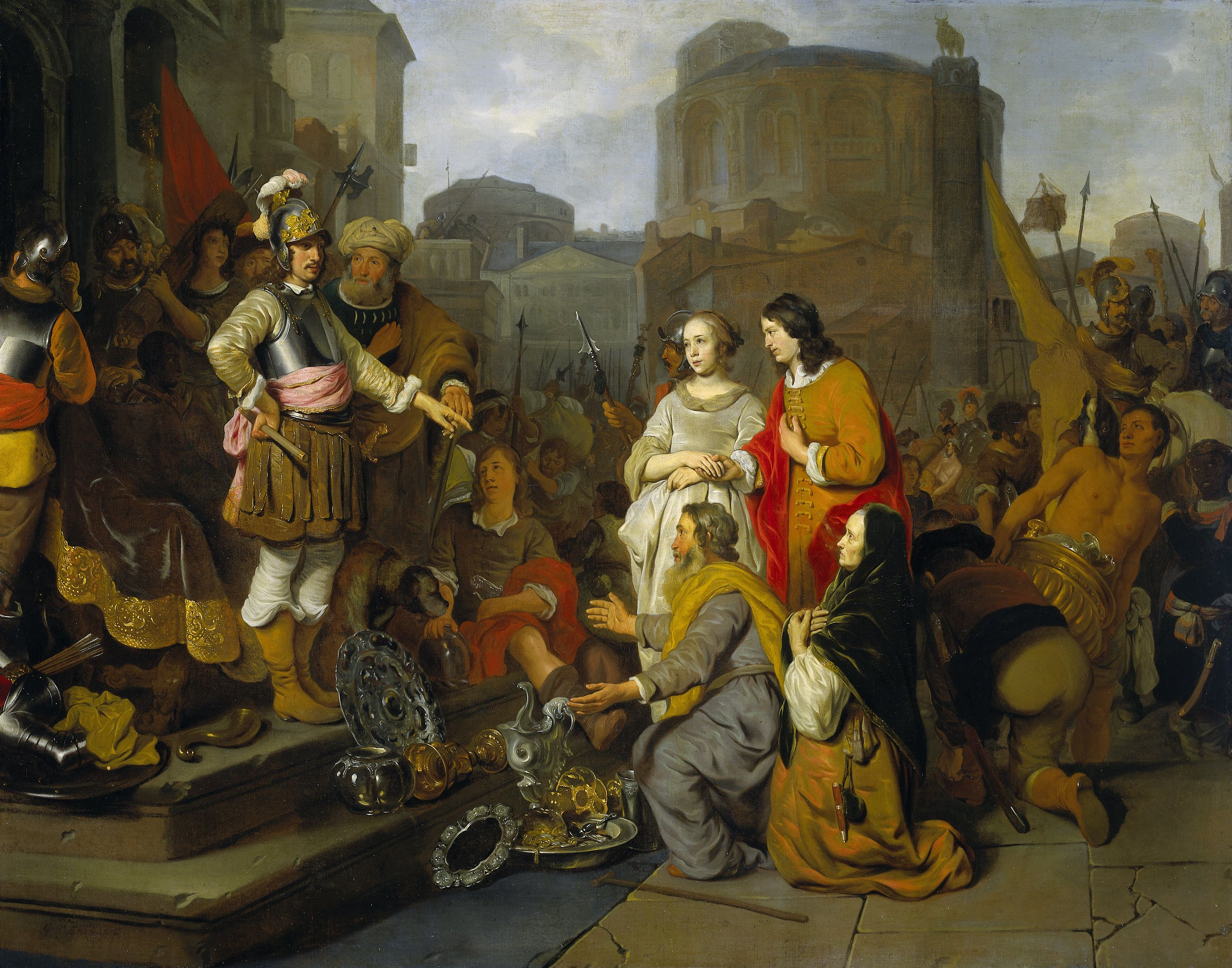
- Artist: Gerbrand van den Eeckhout
- Year: c. 1653
- Medium: oil paint, canvas
- Dimensions: 133.0 cm (52.4 in) × 168.0 cm (66.1 in)
- Location: Rijksmuseum, Netherlands
- Accession no.: SK-C-1631, NK2276, NK2276, 1306, K 1545
- Identifiers: RKDimages ID: 2713

The Continence of Scipio (Dutch: De grootmoedigheid van Scipio) is a c. 1653 painting by Dutch artist Gerbrand van den Eeckhout. It shows the continence of Scipio and is now in the collection of the Rijksmuseum in Amsterdam.

== Description ==
The painting shows the moment when Scipio informs the groom that he can have his bride, as well as the riches that the bride's parents have just paid in ransom. Of the riches displayed, the Memorial Guild Cup, a famous silver ewer by Adam van Vianen, is also in the Rijksmuseum collection. Van den Eeckhout made another version of the same subject, that also features the ewer (lying on its side), which is now in the collection of the Toledo Museum of Art:

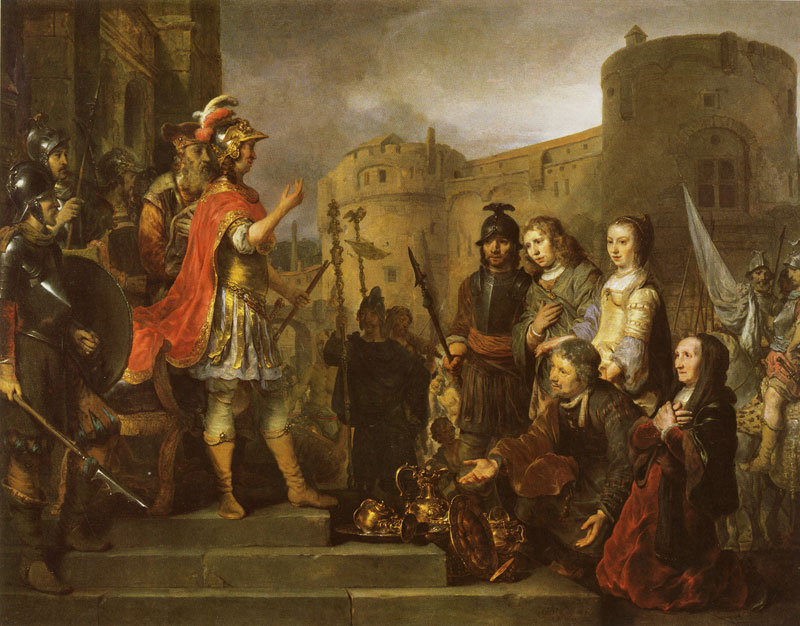
Toledo version

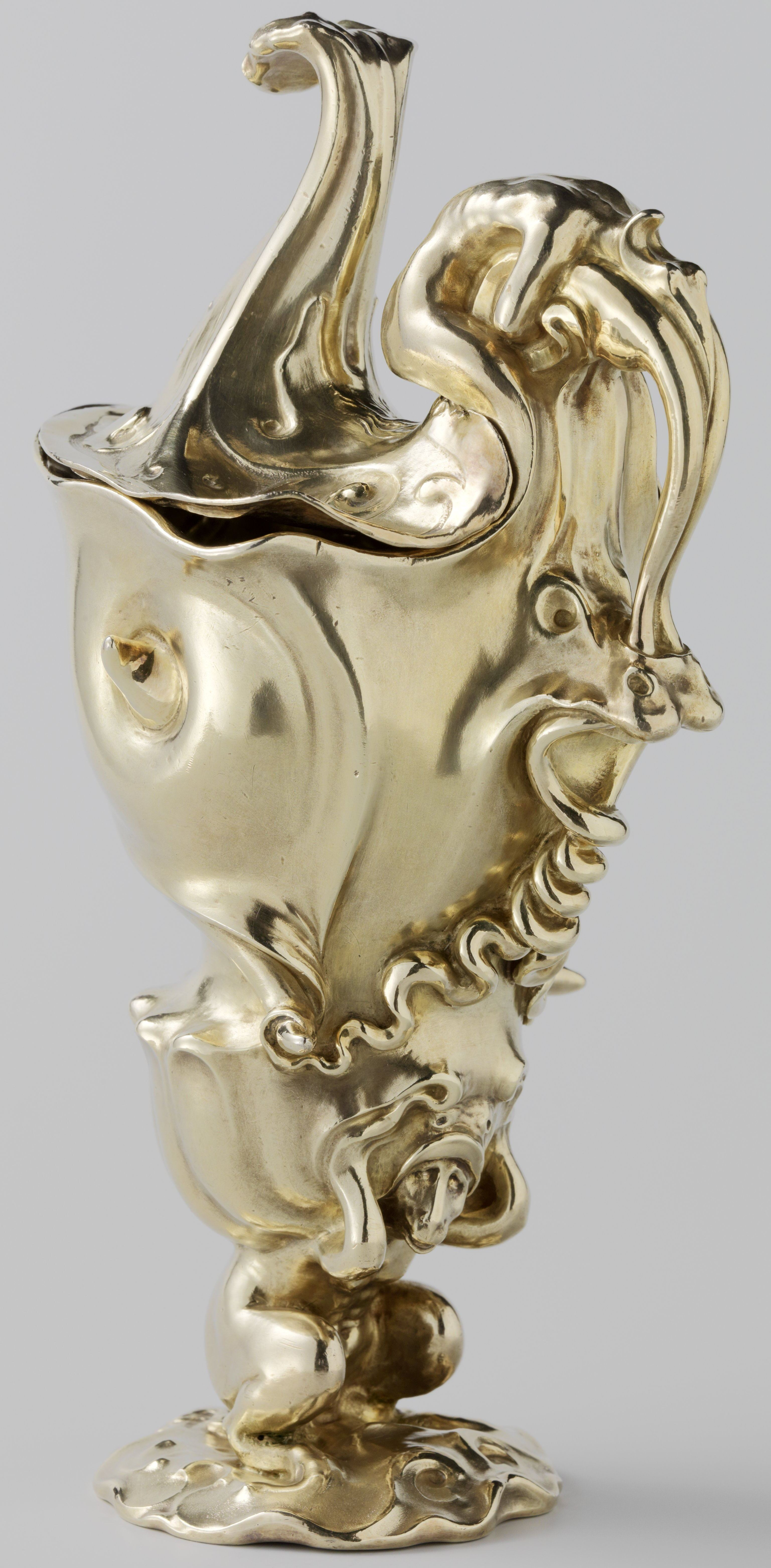
The ewer

This painting is one of several paintings in the collection of art dealer D. Katz that were taken to the Führermuseum in Linz. After World War II it was returned with other Nazi looted art to the Netherlands and has been on loan to the Rijksmuseum since. In 1966 it was noticed by the silver curator of art in the museum, Theresia M. Duyvené de Wit Klinkhamer, who included it in her overview of paintings that show the Adam van Vianen ewer.
