= Gerbrand van den Eeckhout =

Dutch painter (1621–1674)

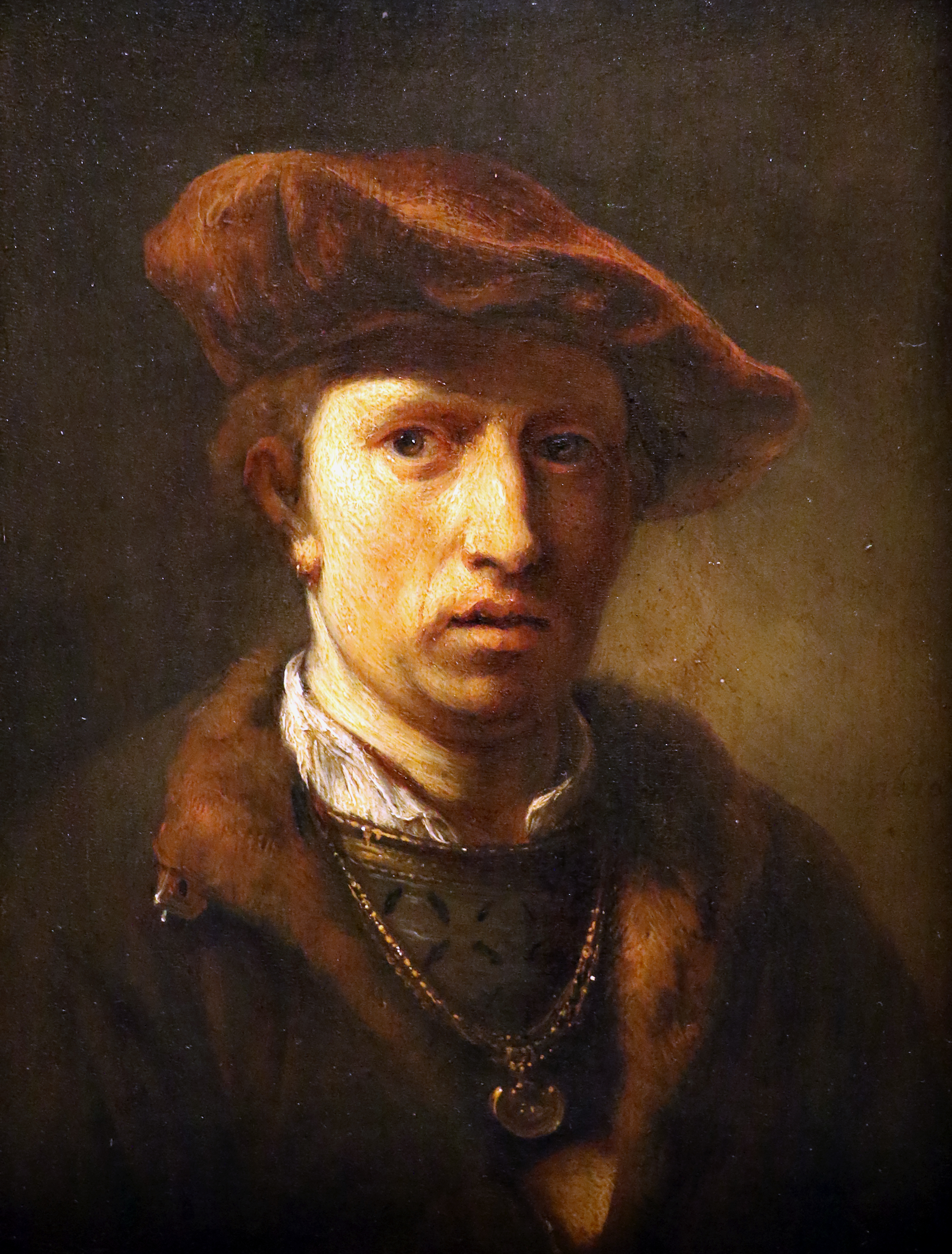
Self-portrait (1659)

Gerbrand van den Eeckhout (19 August 1621 – 29 September 1674) was a Dutch Golden Age painter and a favourite student of Rembrandt. He was also an etcher, an amateur poet, a collector and an adviser on art.

== Biography ==
Gerbrand was born in Amsterdam, the son of a jeweller, a Mennonite who fled after 1585 from Antwerp to the north. In 1631 his mother died. His father's second wife was Cornelia Dedel, the daughter of a founder of the Delft chamber of the Dutch East India Company.

Arnold Houbraken records Van den Eeckhout was a pupil of Rembrandt. A fellow pupil to Ferdinand Bol, Nicolaes Maes and Govert Flinck, but regarded as inferior to them in skill and experience; he soon assumed Rembrandt's manner with such success that his pictures were confused with those of his master.

Eeckhout does not merely copy the subjects; he also takes the shapes, the figures, the Jewish dress and the pictorial effects of his master. It is difficult to form an exact judgment of Eeckhout's qualities at the outset of his career. His earliest pieces are probably those in which he more faithfully reproduced Rembrandt's peculiarities. Exclusively his is a tinge of green in shadows marring the harmony of the work, a gaudiness of jarring tints, uniform surface and a touch more quick than subtle.

Eeckhout matriculated early in the Gild of Amsterdam. As he grew older Eeckhout succeeded best in portraits, for example that of Isaac Commelin (formerly identified as a portrait of the historian Olfert Dapper (1669)), in the Städel collection in Frankfurt. Eeckhout occasionally varied his style. He followed Gerard ter Borch in Gambling Soldiers, at Stafford House, and a Soldiers' Merrymaking, in the collection of the marquess of Bute. Amongst the best of Eeckhout's works are Christ in the Temple (1662), at Munich, and the Haman and Mordecai of 1665, at Luton House.

Eeckhout, unmarried, was also appreciated as art connoisseur, and dealing with poets and scientists. At the end of his life he was living with his sister-in-law, a widow, and her five children on Herengracht, at a very prestigious part of the canal. He died in Amsterdam.

== Works ==
- The Continence of Scipio, Rijksmuseum Amsterdam
- Isaac Blessing Jacob, in the Metropolitan Museum of Art
- Resurrection of Jairus' daughter, in the Gemäldegalerie, Berlin
- Presentation in the Temple, in the Dresden gallery
- Presentation in the Temple, at Berlin
- Giving a Tenth, at Museum of Yugoslav History in Belgrade
- Tobit with the Angel, at Brunswick
- Woman taken in Adultery, at Amsterdam
- Anna presenting her Son to the High Priest, in the Louvre
- Epiphany, at Turin
- Circumcision, at Kassel
- A likeness of a lady at a dressingtable with a string of beads, at Vienna
- Sportsman with Hounds, in the Van der Hoo gallery (?)
- Group of Children with Goats in the Hermitage
- Vision of Cornelius the Centurion, at The Walters Art Museum
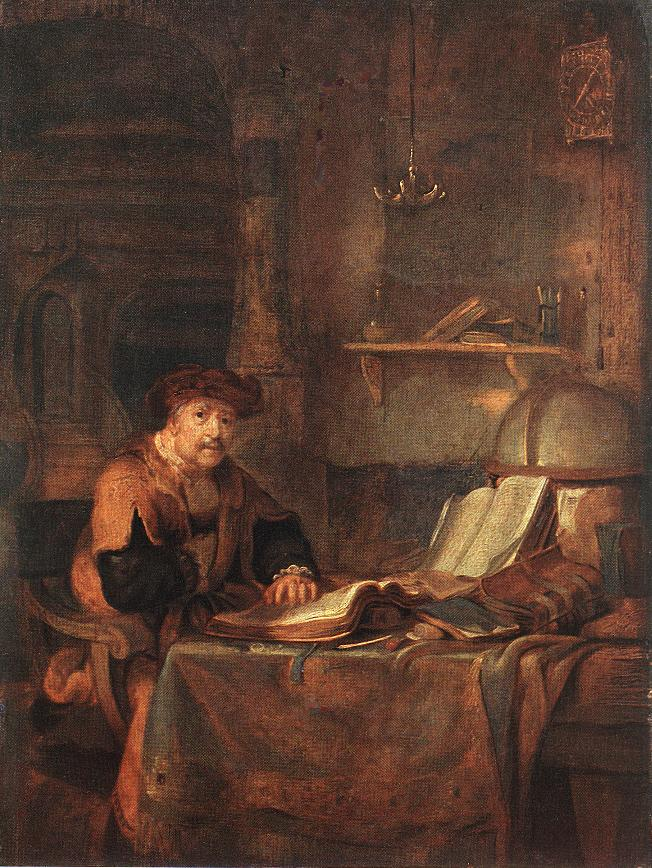
Scholar with His Books

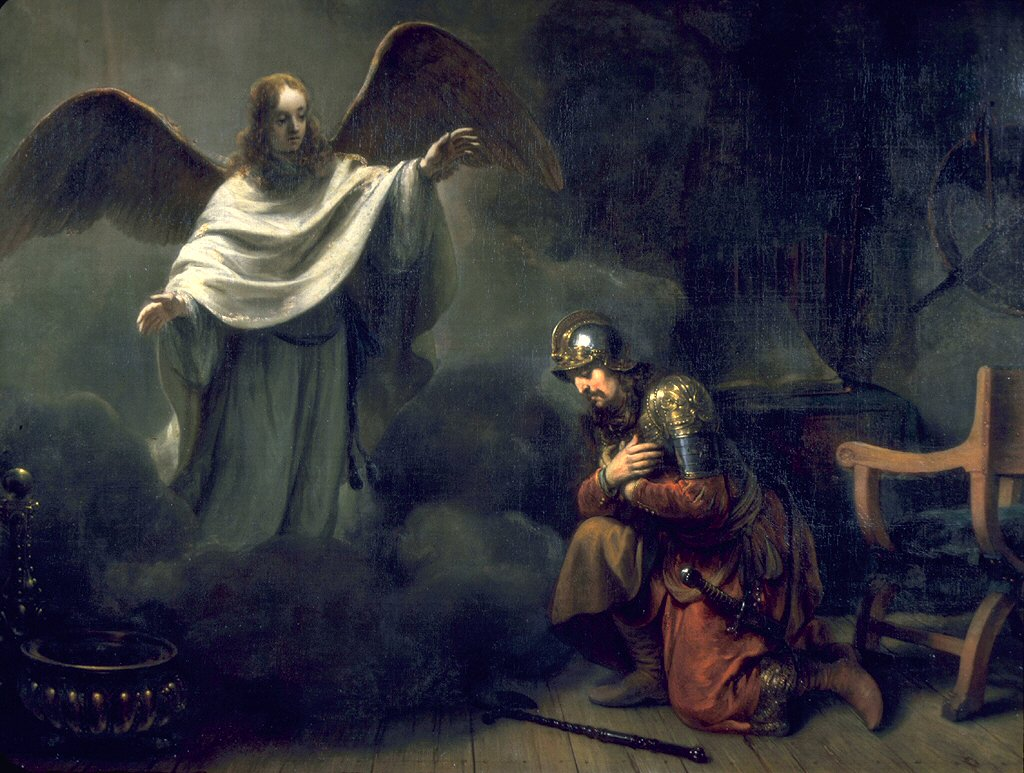
Vision of Cornelius the Centurion (1664), Walters Art Museum

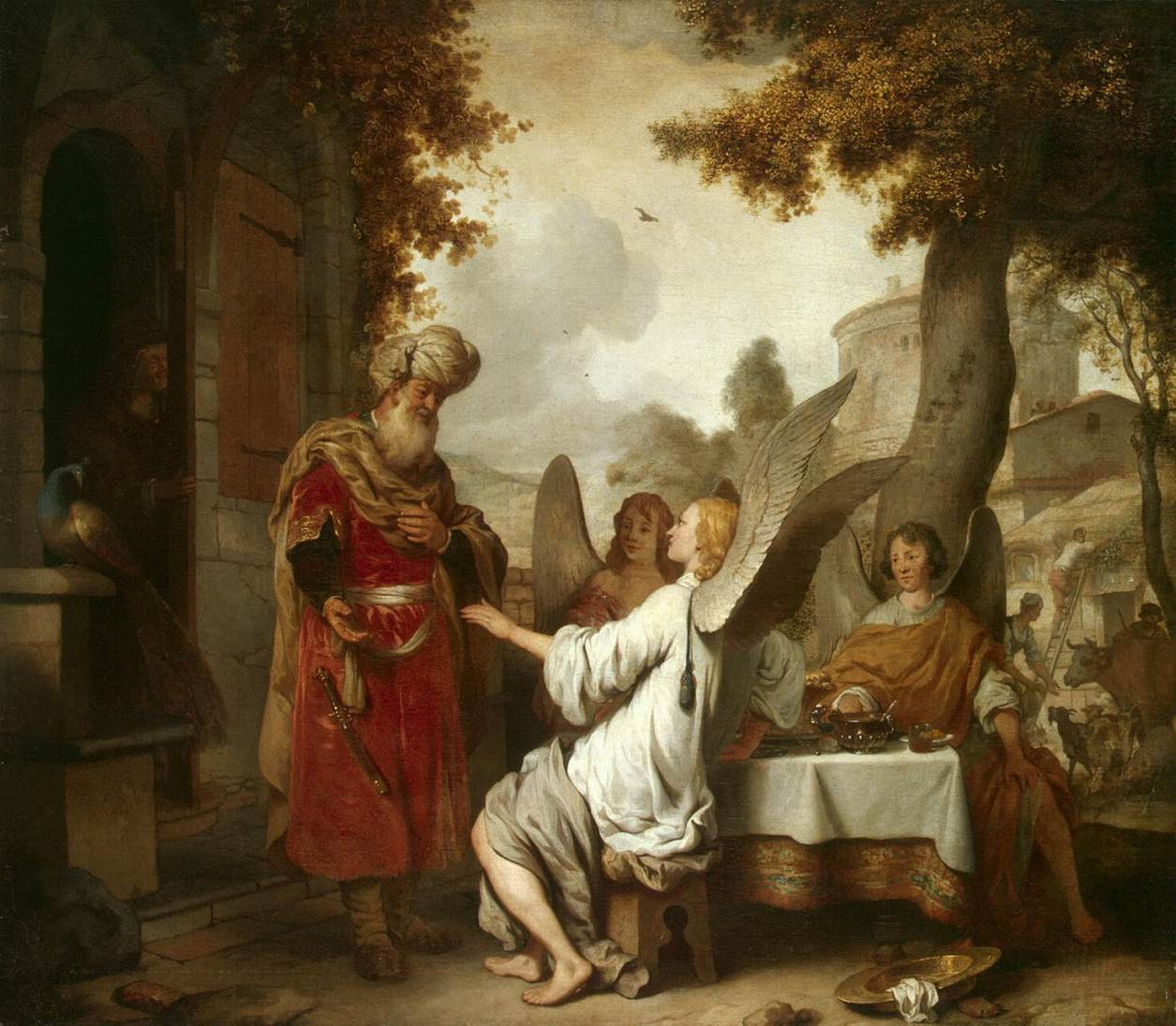
Abraham and the Three Angels (1656), Hermitage Museum

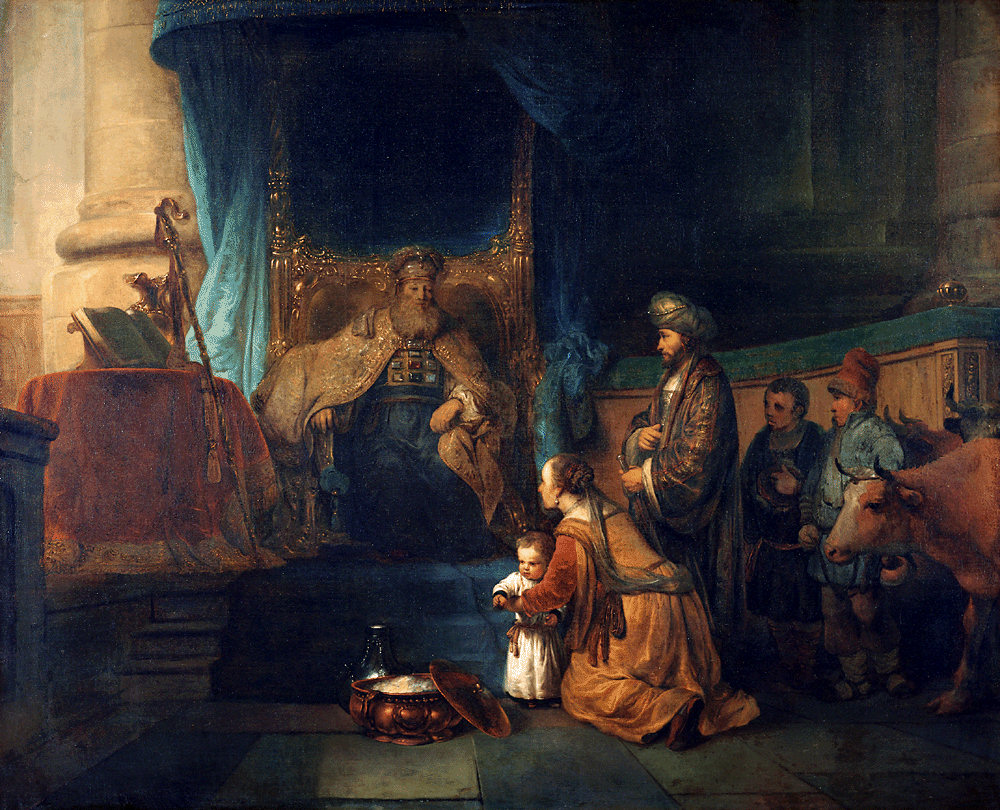
Anna presenting her son Samuel to the priest Eli (circa 1665), Louvre

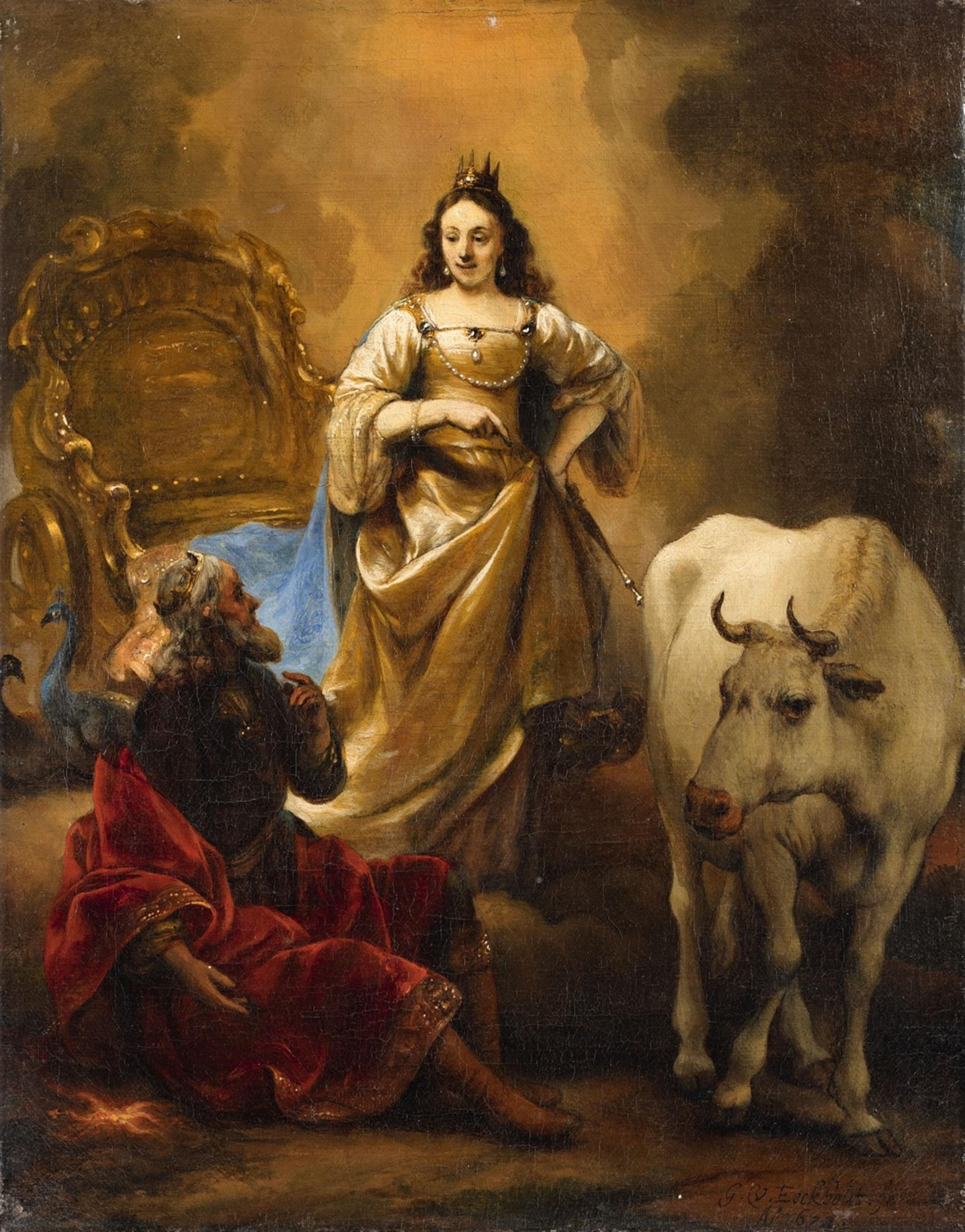
Juno, Jupiter and Io (1672)

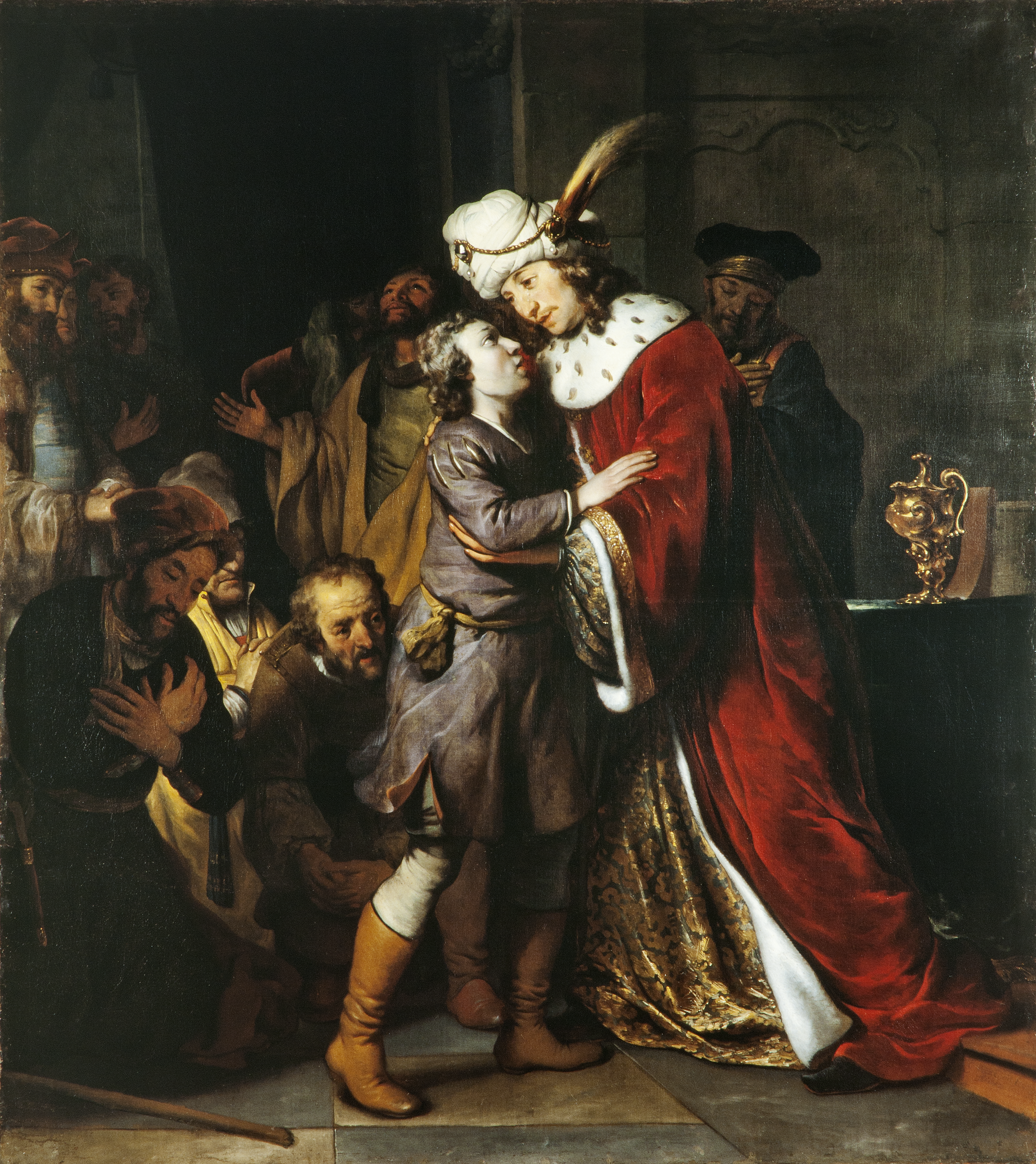
Joseph and his brothers (1657) Skokloster Castle
