= Auricular style =

Style of ornamental decoration

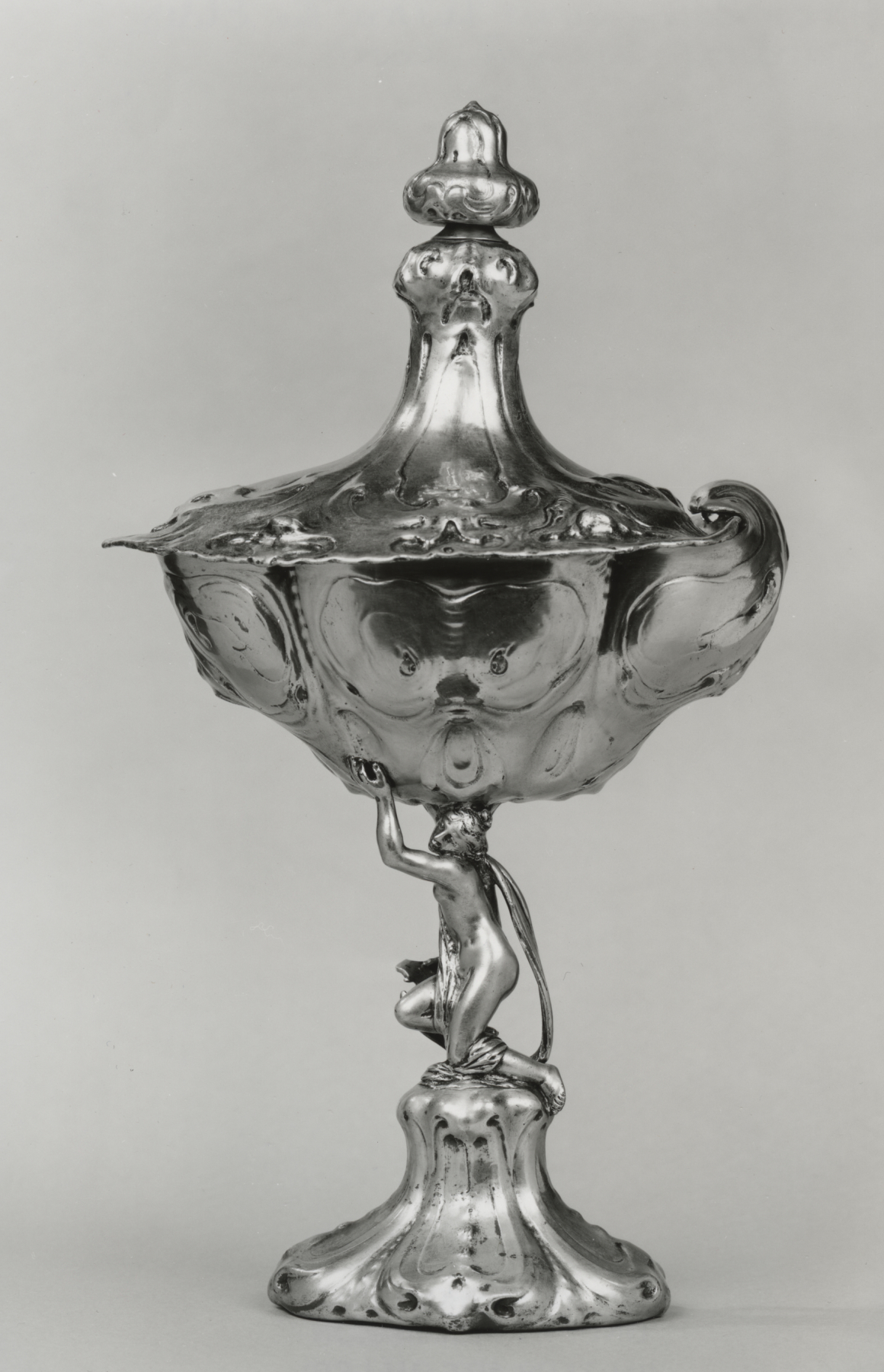
Standing cup by Johannes Lutma, 1639

The auricular style or lobate style (Dutch: kwabstijl, German: Ohrmuschelstil) is a style of ornamental decoration, mainly found in Northern Europe in the first half of the 17th century, bridging Northern Mannerism and the Baroque. The style was especially important and effective in silversmithing, but was also used in minor architectural ornamentation such as door and window reveals, picture frames, and a wide variety of the decorative arts. It uses softly flowing abstract shapes in relief, sometimes asymmetrical, whose resemblance to the side view of the human ear gives it its name, or at least its "undulating, slithery and boneless forms occasionally carry a suggestion of the inside of an ear or a conch shell". It is often associated with stylized marine animal forms, or ambiguous masks and shapes that might be such, which seem to emerge from the rippling, fluid background, as if the silver remained in its molten state.

In some other European languages, the style is covered by the local equivalent of the term cartilage baroque because the forms may resemble cartilage (e.g. Knorpelbarock in German, bruskbarokk in Norwegian, bruskbarok in Danish). However, those these terms may be rather widely and vaguely applied to a bewildering range of styles of Northern Mannerist and Baroque ornament. In Dutch, a "dolphin and mollusk" style is mentioned.

It is often an elaborated, three-dimensional version of strapwork motifs.

== Metalwork ==
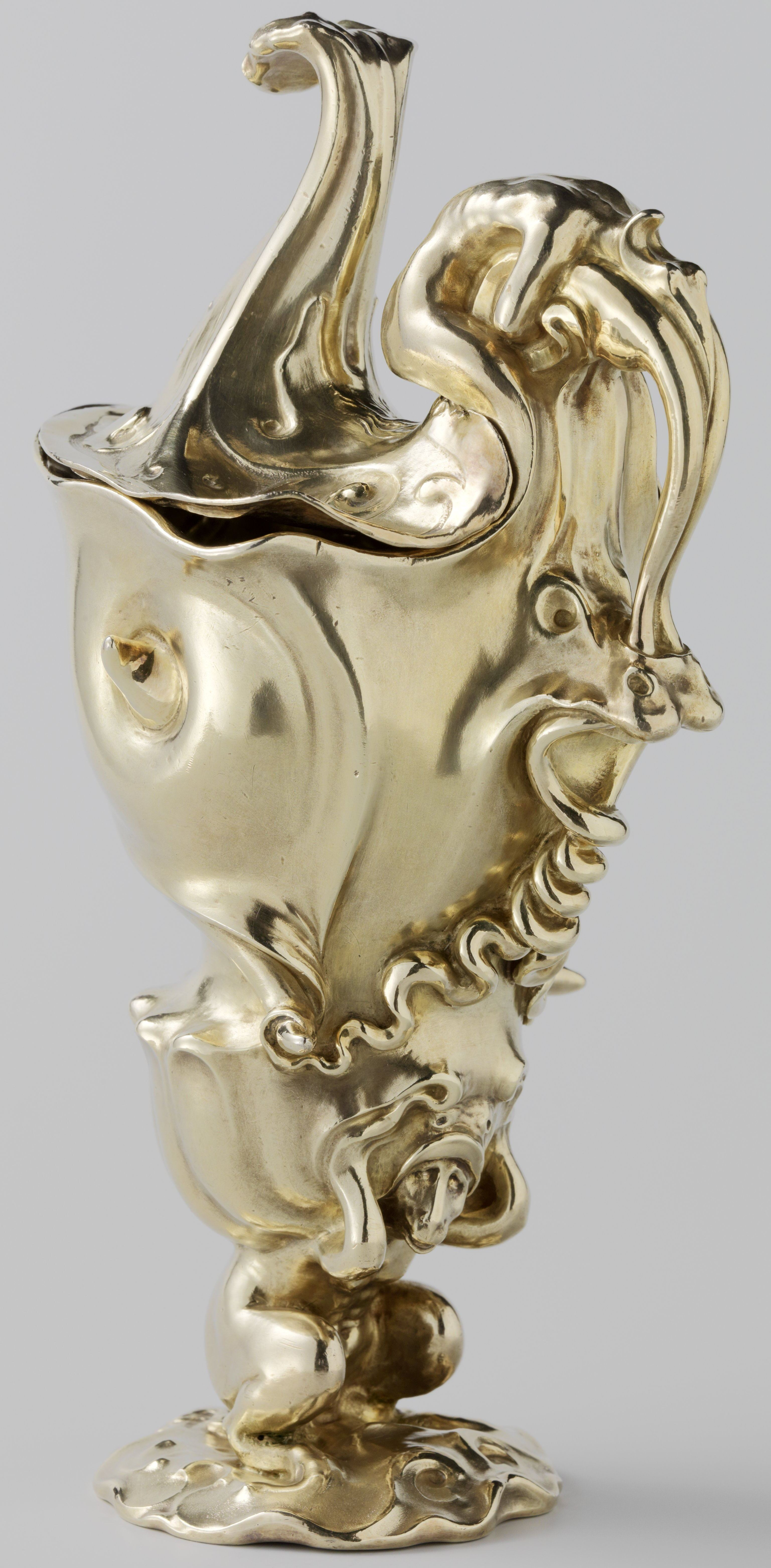
The Adam van Vianen Memorial ewer for his brother, 1614, which appears in several paintings.

Although precedents have been traced in the graphic designs of Italian Mannerist artists such as Giulio Romano and Enea Vico, the auricular style can first be found in 1598 in the important ornament book of Northern Mannerism, Architectura: Von Außtheilung, Symmetria und Proportion der Fünff Seulen ..., by Wendel Dietterlin of Stuttgart, in the second edition of 1598. It can be found in the designs of Hans Vredeman de Vries in the Netherlands, and was used most effectively in the hands of the Utrecht silversmiths Paul and Adam van Vianen, and Paul's pupil Johannes Lutma, who settled in Amsterdam. Another Dutch silversmith who worked in the auricular style was Thomas Bogaert. At mid-century, designs for plate by M. Mosyn were published in Amsterdam. Christian van Vianen, a son of Adam, worked in England at the courts of Charles I and Charles II, and took the style there. A bratina or Russian toasting-cup in the Walters Art Museum was made in Russia in 1650–70 in an auricular style that was presumably copied from pieces brought in by Dutch traders, perhaps as gifts to ease trade deals.

In metalwork, the style was in harmony with the malleable nature of the material, often giving the impression that the object is beginning to melt. It contrasted strongly with the preceding Mannerist style of crowded figurative scenes, as for example in the Lomellini Ewer and Basin of 1620–21, although some works managed to combine the two styles, as in a silver-gilt ewer and basin of 1630, made in Delft and now in Utrecht, with auricular elements replacing strapwork.

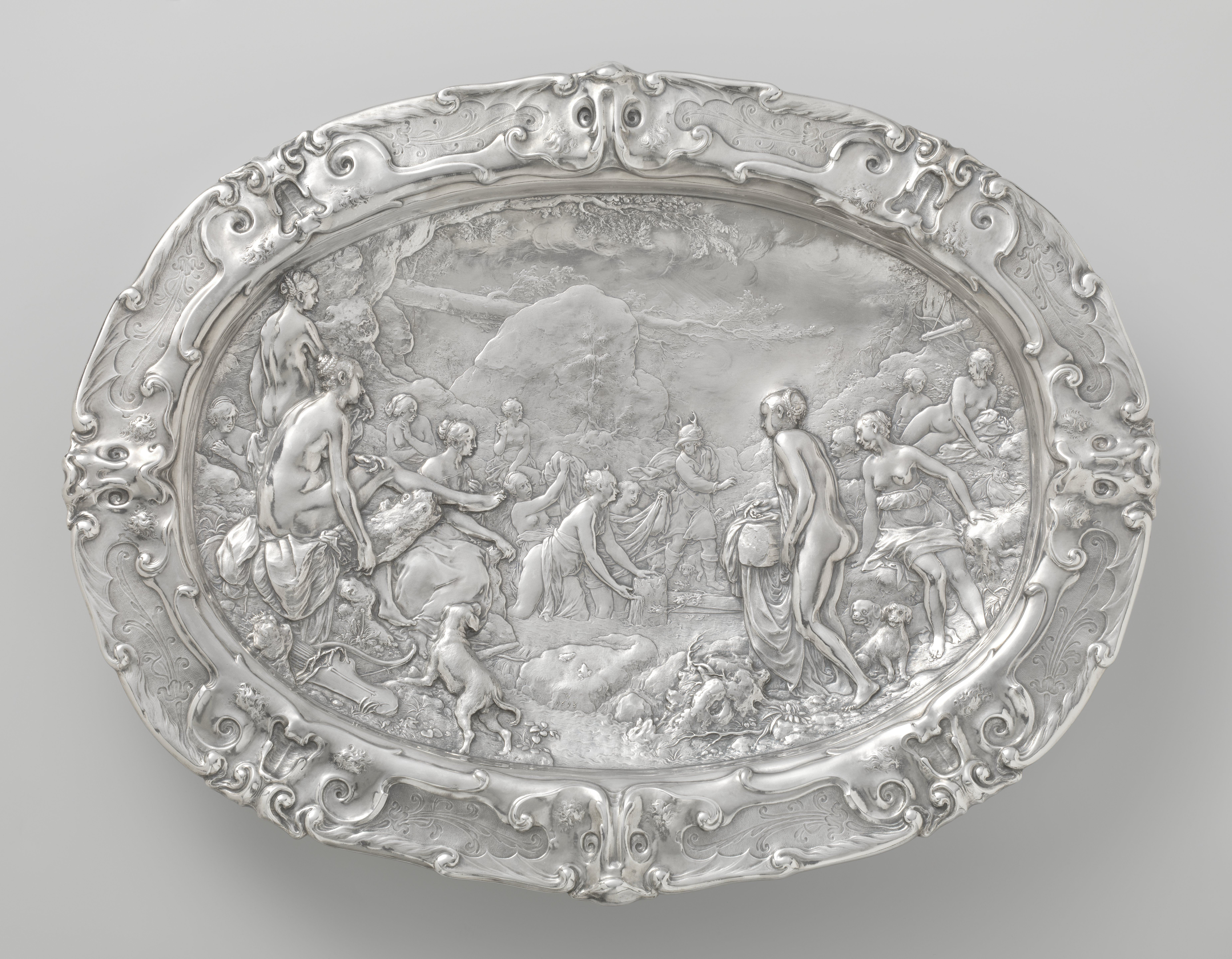
Diana and Actaeon basin, Paul van Vianen, 1613

=== Key works ===
Most of the key works are in the Netherlands, especially the Rijksmuseum, Amsterdam, whose collection includes ewer and basin sets by Paul van Vianen (1613, with Diana and Callisto) and Johannes Lutma (1647). Especially important is a gilded ewer by Adam van Vianen (1614).

The Adam van Vianen ewer is "a strikingly original work that is largely abstract and completely sculptural in its conception", and was commissioned by the Amsterdam goldsmiths' guild to commemorate the death of Paul, despite neither brother living in Amsterdam or being a member of the guild. The piece became famous and appears in several Dutch Golden Age paintings, both still lifes and history paintings, "no doubt in part because its bizarre form allowed it to pass as an object from an ancient and foreign land", and so useful for Old Testament scenes and the like. According to James Trilling, it "is one of the very few ornamental works that deserve recognition as art-historical turning points. Van Vianen's breakthrough was the introduction of inchoate or indeterminate form, which paved the way for both Rococo and modernist ornament." It was raised by a lengthy process of chasing from a single sheet of silver, and chasing was the main technique used in auricular silver.

The Diana and Actaeon bowl of 1613 by Paul van Vianen (Rijksmuseum), shows scenes from the myth of Diana and Actaeon, with a border in the Auricular style.

The "Dolphin Basin", which presumably once had a matching ewer, is an asymmetric form with watery motifs by Christian van Vianen (1635), now in the Victoria and Albert Museum in London.

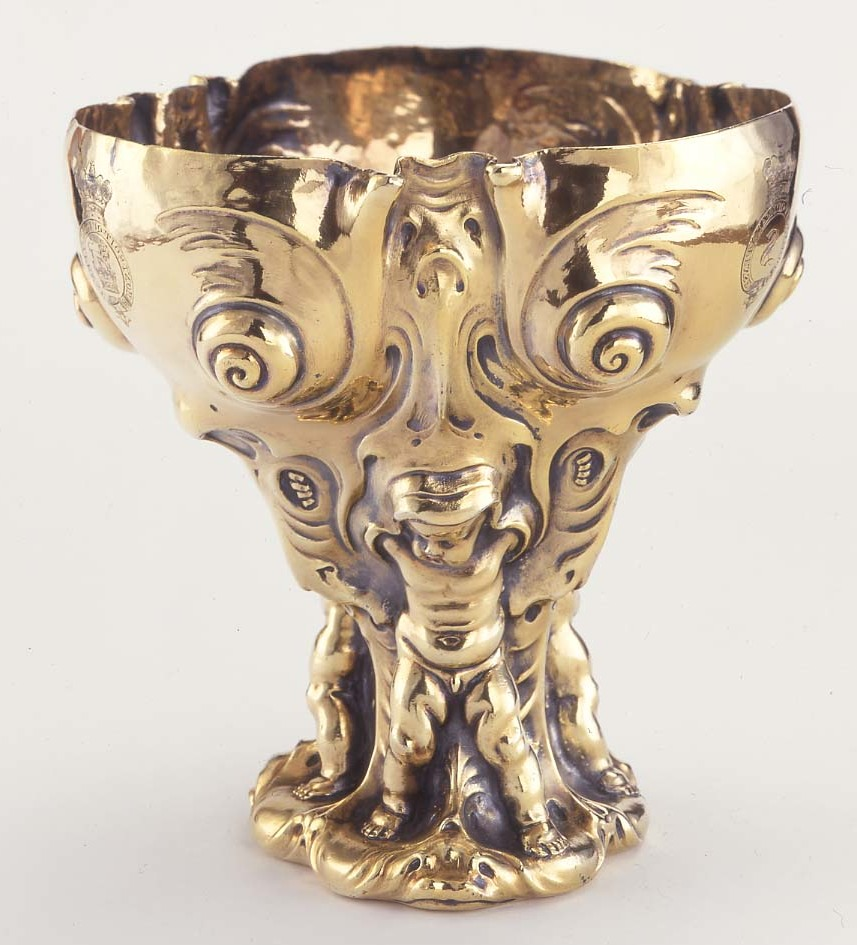
Christian van Vianen, Standing cup, 1640-41, Waddesdon Manor

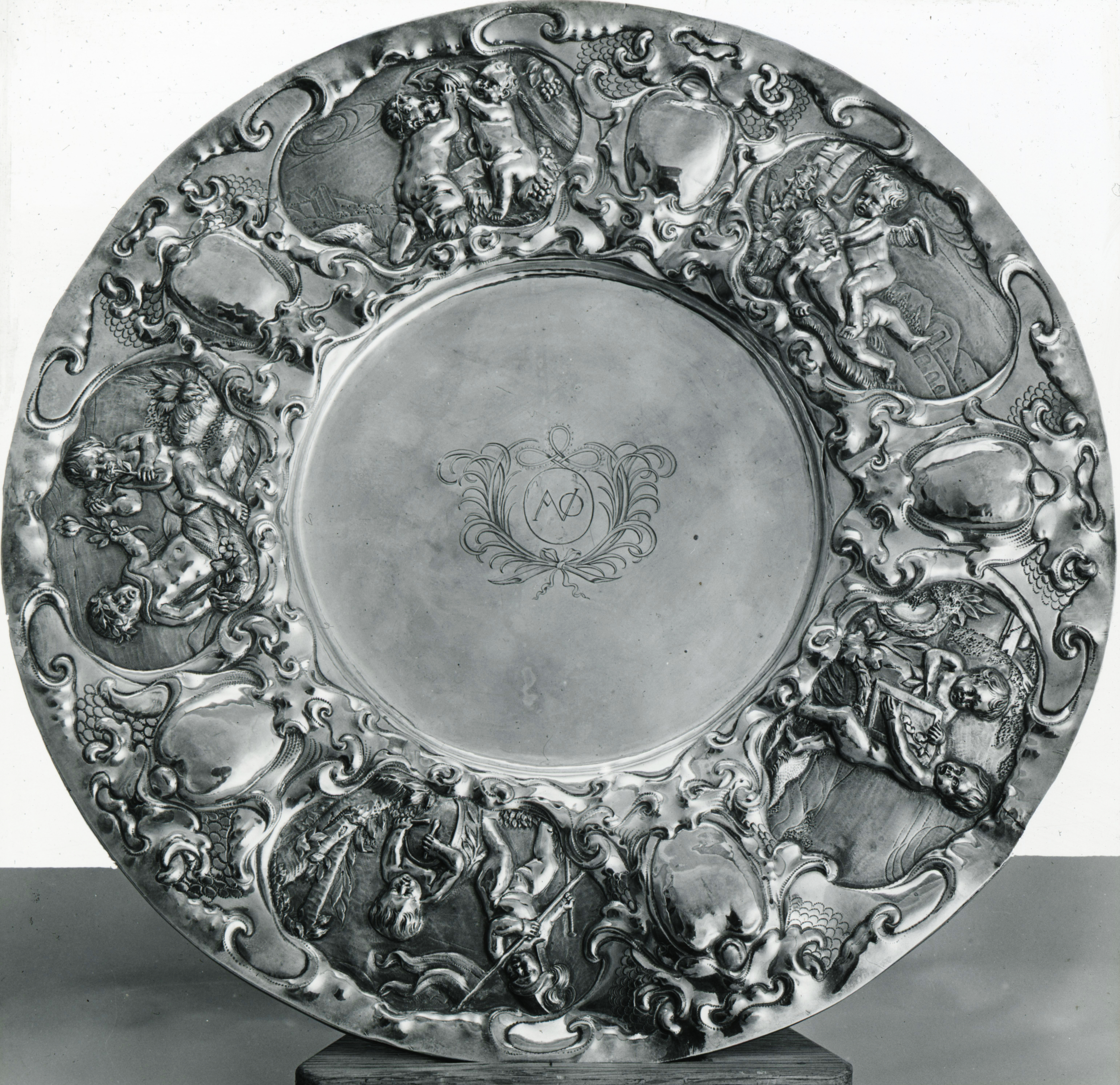
Dish, by Philippus Lude

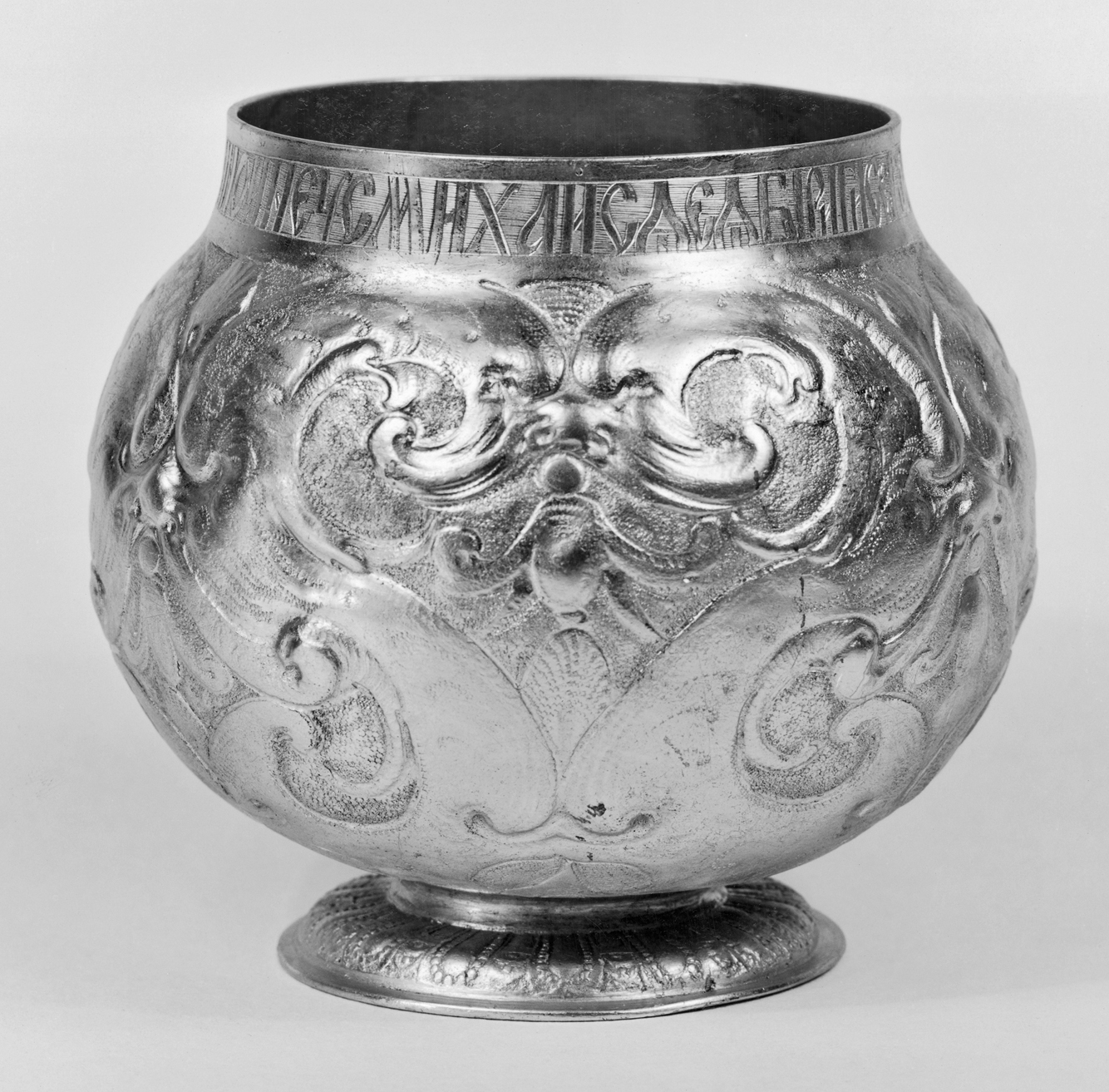
Russian, drinking cup (Bratina)

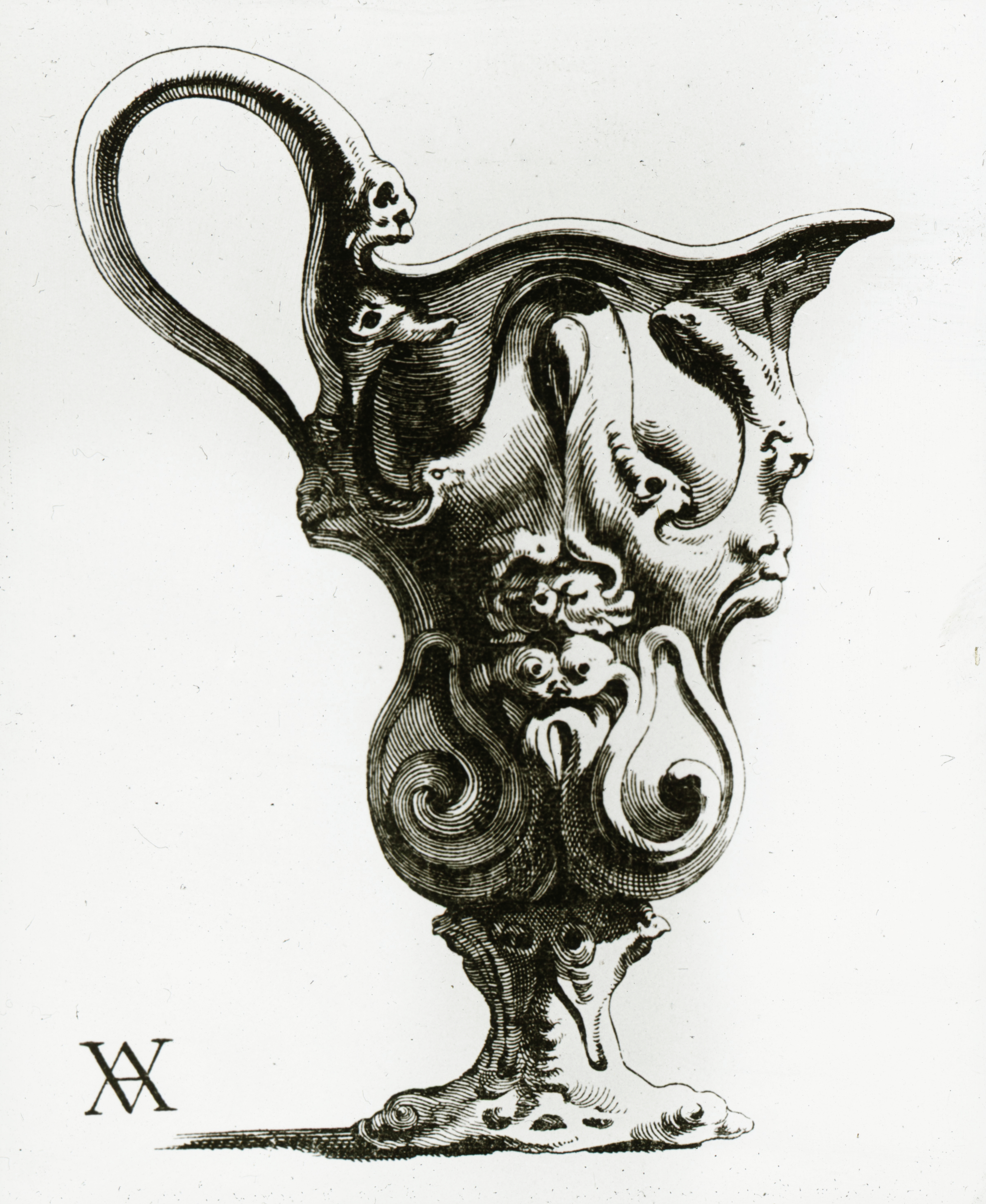
Print after silver jug by Adam or Christian van Vianen

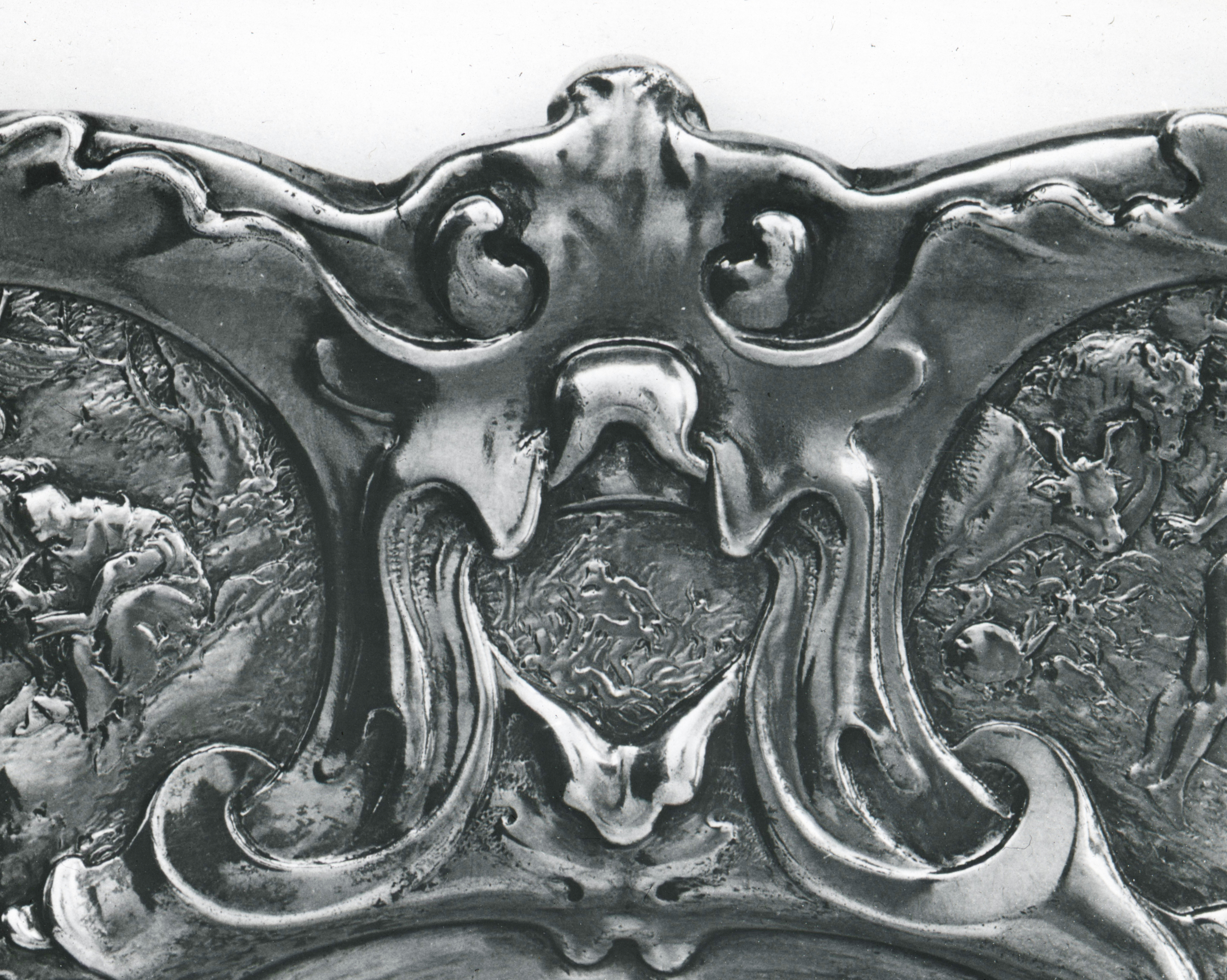
Detail of a Lutma dish

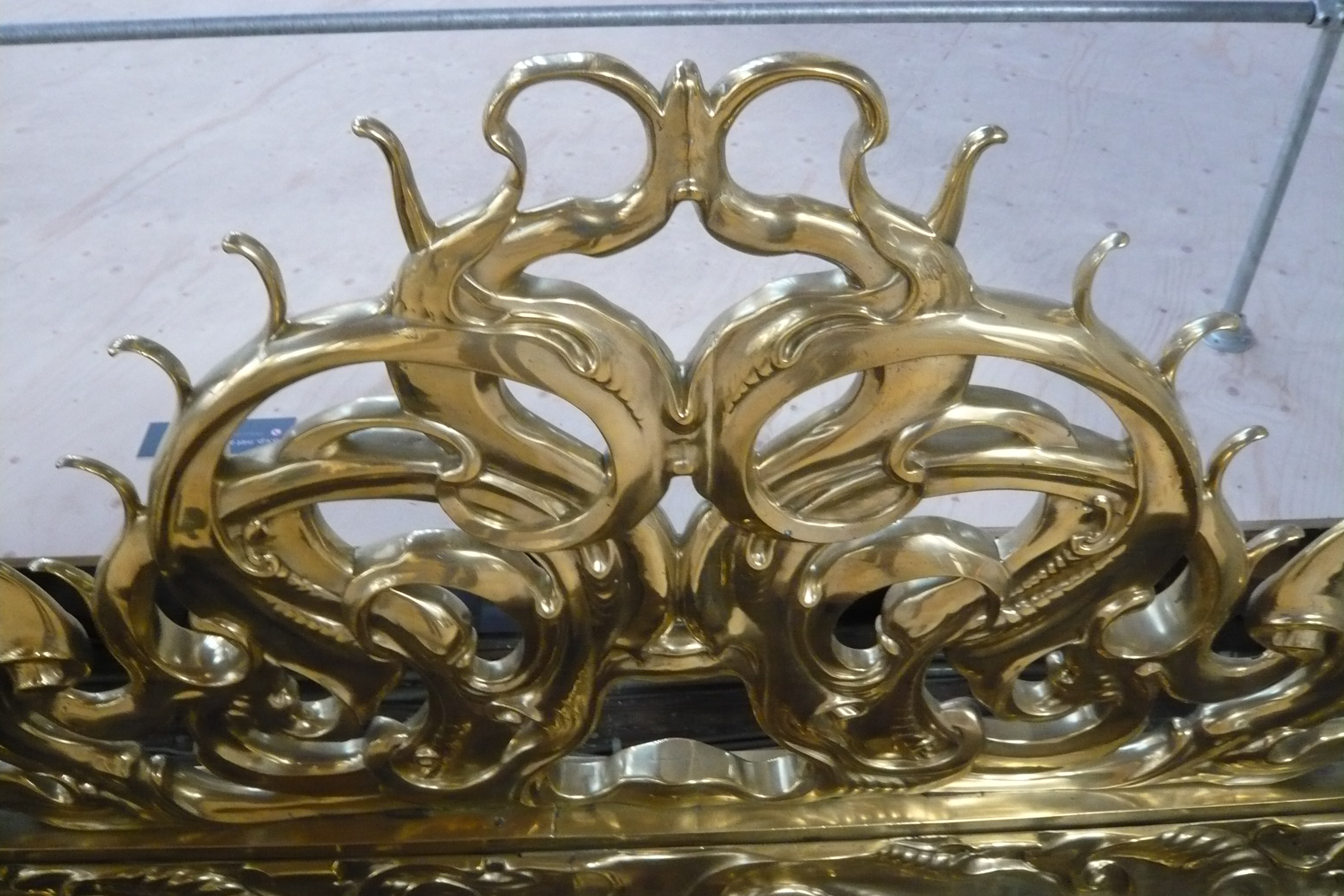
Detail of brass choir-screen by Lutma, Nieuwe Kerk, Amsterdam

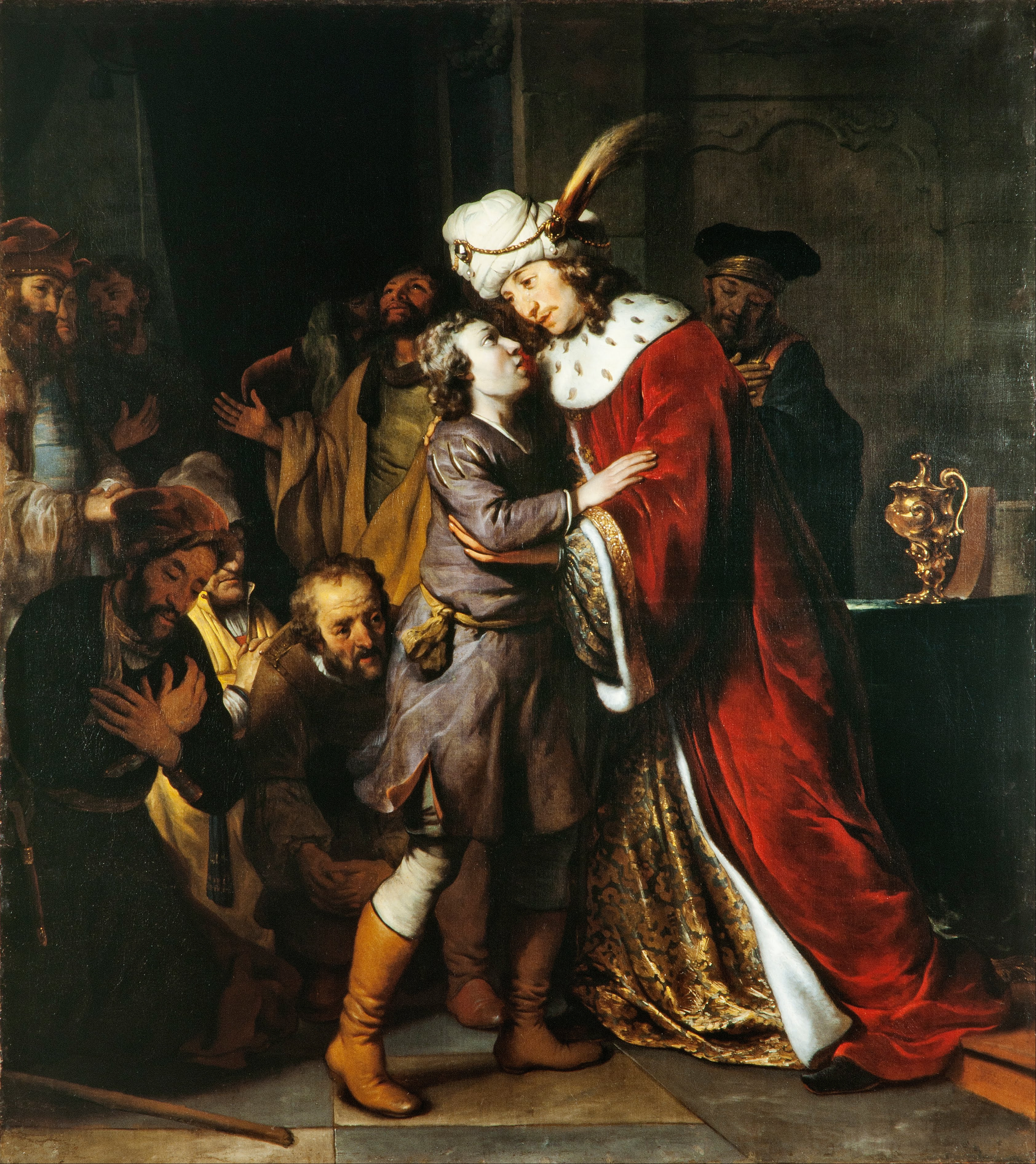
The Adam van Vianen Memorial ewer in Joseph and his Brothers, by Gerbrand van den Eeckhout

== In other media ==
The style was also effective in other materials, such as stone in gable stones, or carved wood used for furniture and especially picture frames. Different varieties became popular in both English and Dutch frames. One English type are known as Sunderland frames after the frames Robert Spencer, 2nd Earl of Sunderland put on the pictures at Althorp, his new country house.

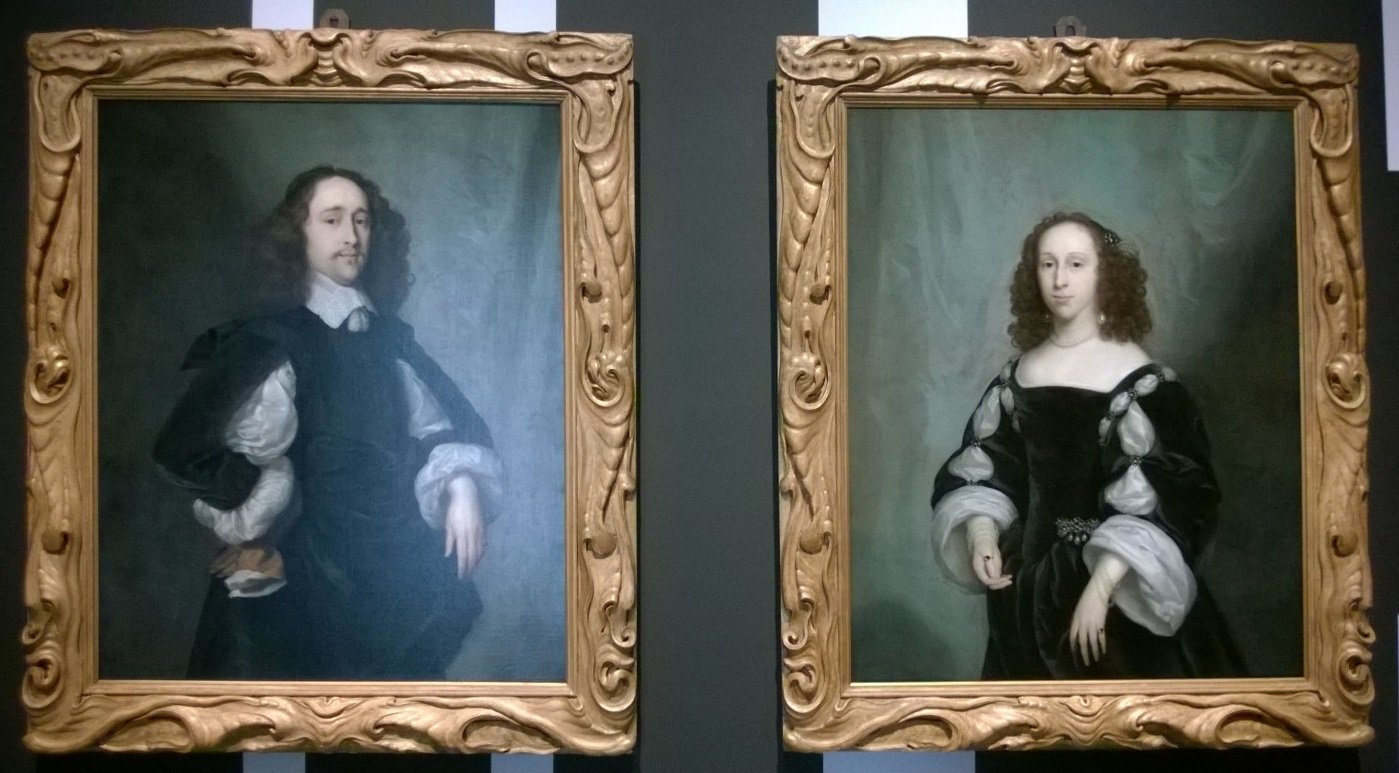
Auricular frames on portraits dated 1654 by Cornelis Janssens van Ceulen

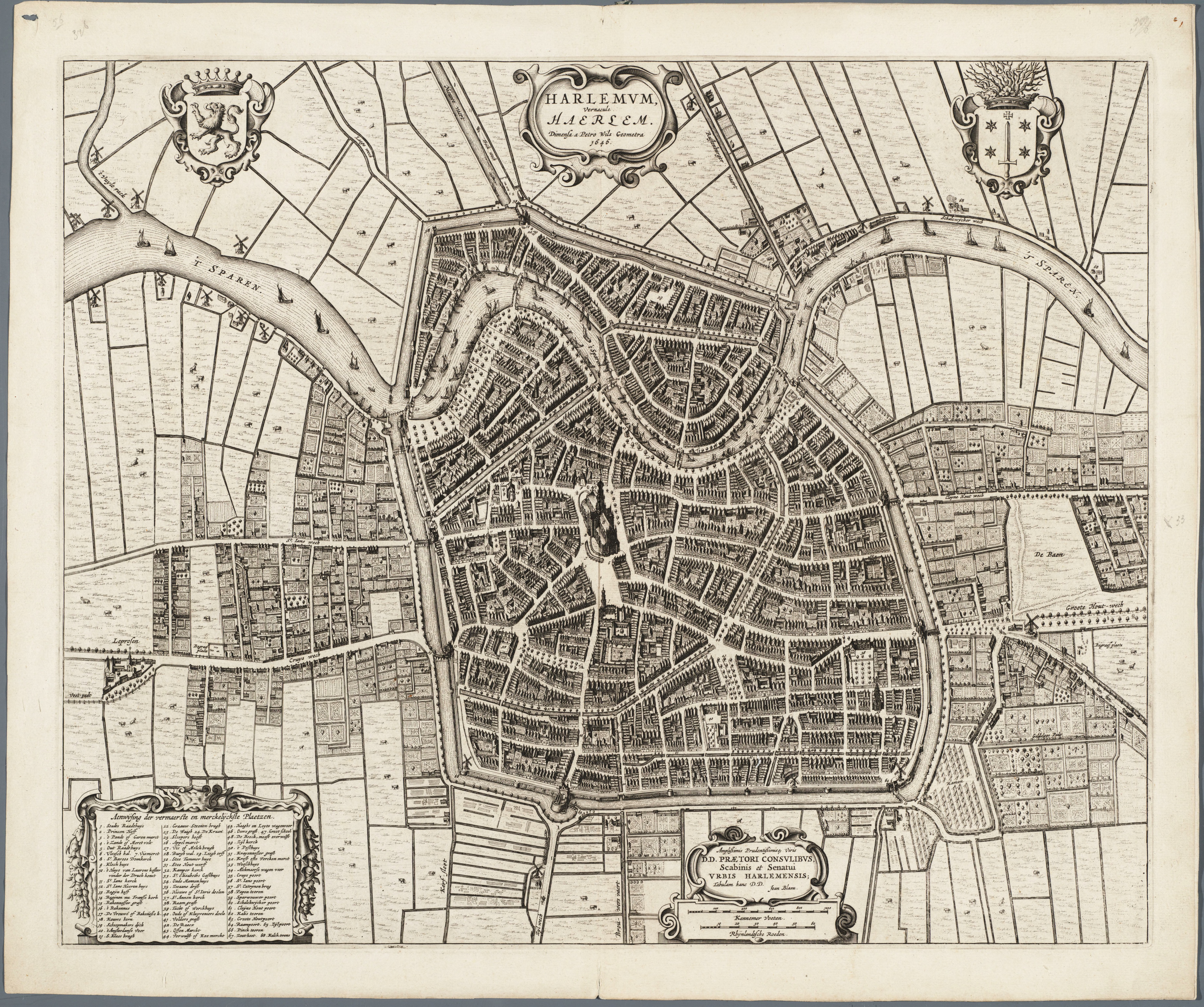
1646 map of Haarlem showing the title within a cartouche in auricular style

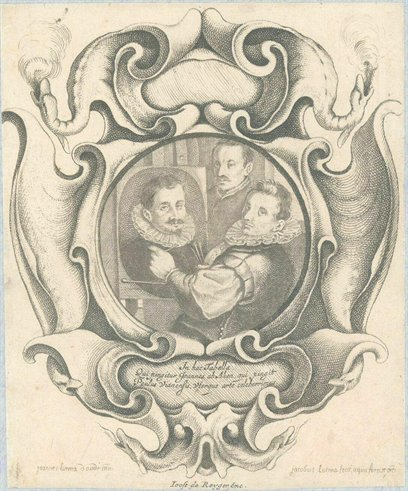
Engraved portrait by Jacob Lutma after Johannes Lutma the Elder, of Hans von Aachen with Adriaen de Vries and Paul van Vianen with cartouche in auricular style

Around the mid-century, Cardinal Leopoldo de' Medici had his large picture collection, housed in the Pitti Palace in Florence, reframed in the auricular style, perhaps influenced by Stefano della Bella. These Medici frames were more three-dimensional than the other frame styles, with more areas both raised or entirely cut through. The framing styles were long-lasting, surviving in use long enough to be reinvigorated by the Rococo.

The style was effective for cartouches, whether in three-dimensional uses or for bookplates and the like. It later influenced Rococo and then Art Nouveau ornament.
