= Diana and Actaeon basin =

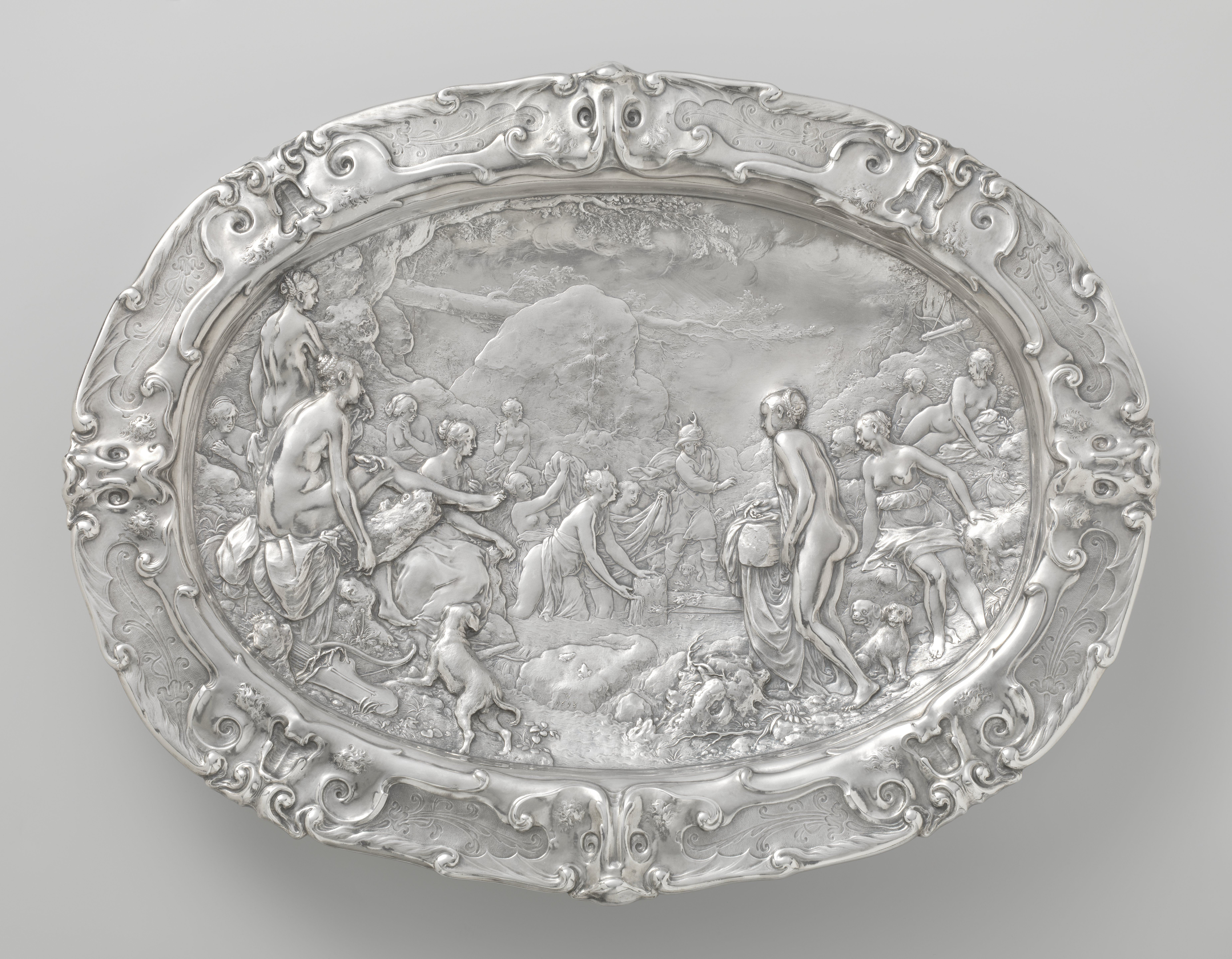
Diana and Actaeon basin

The Diana and Actaeon basin or Basin with Scenes from the Myth of Diana and Actaeon is a 1613 silver bowl produced by the Dutch silversmith Paul van Vianen. It shows scenes from the myth of Diana and Actaeon, with a border in the Auricular style. It is in the collection of the Rijksmuseum in Amsterdam, which acquired it in 1947.
