= Johannes Lutma =

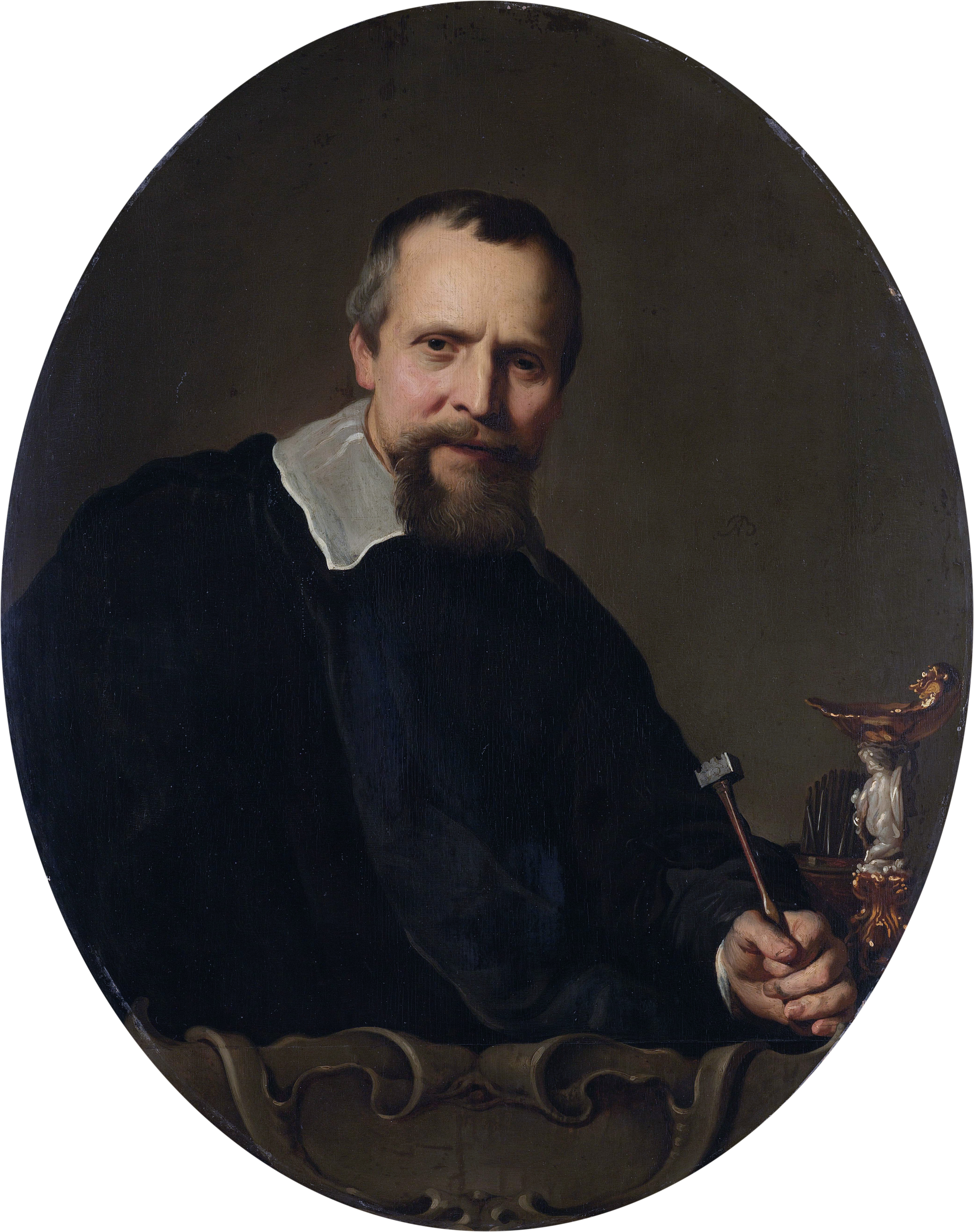
Johannes Lutma by Jacob Adriaensz Backer (portrait made between 1639 and 1651)

Janus, or Johannes Lutma the elder (Emden, c. 1584 – Amsterdam, January 1669) was a well-known Dutch silversmith.

== Biography ==
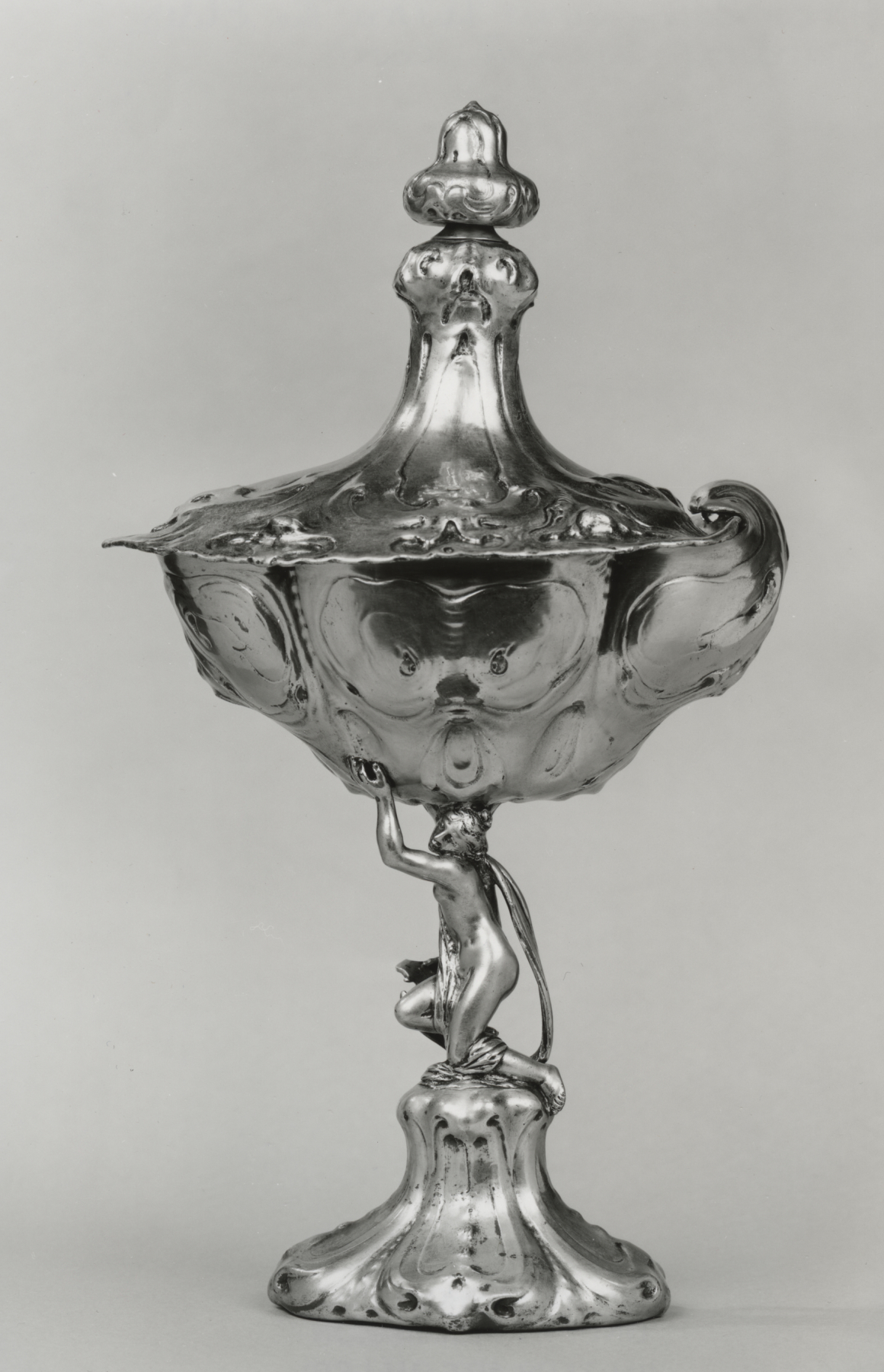
Standing cup with cover

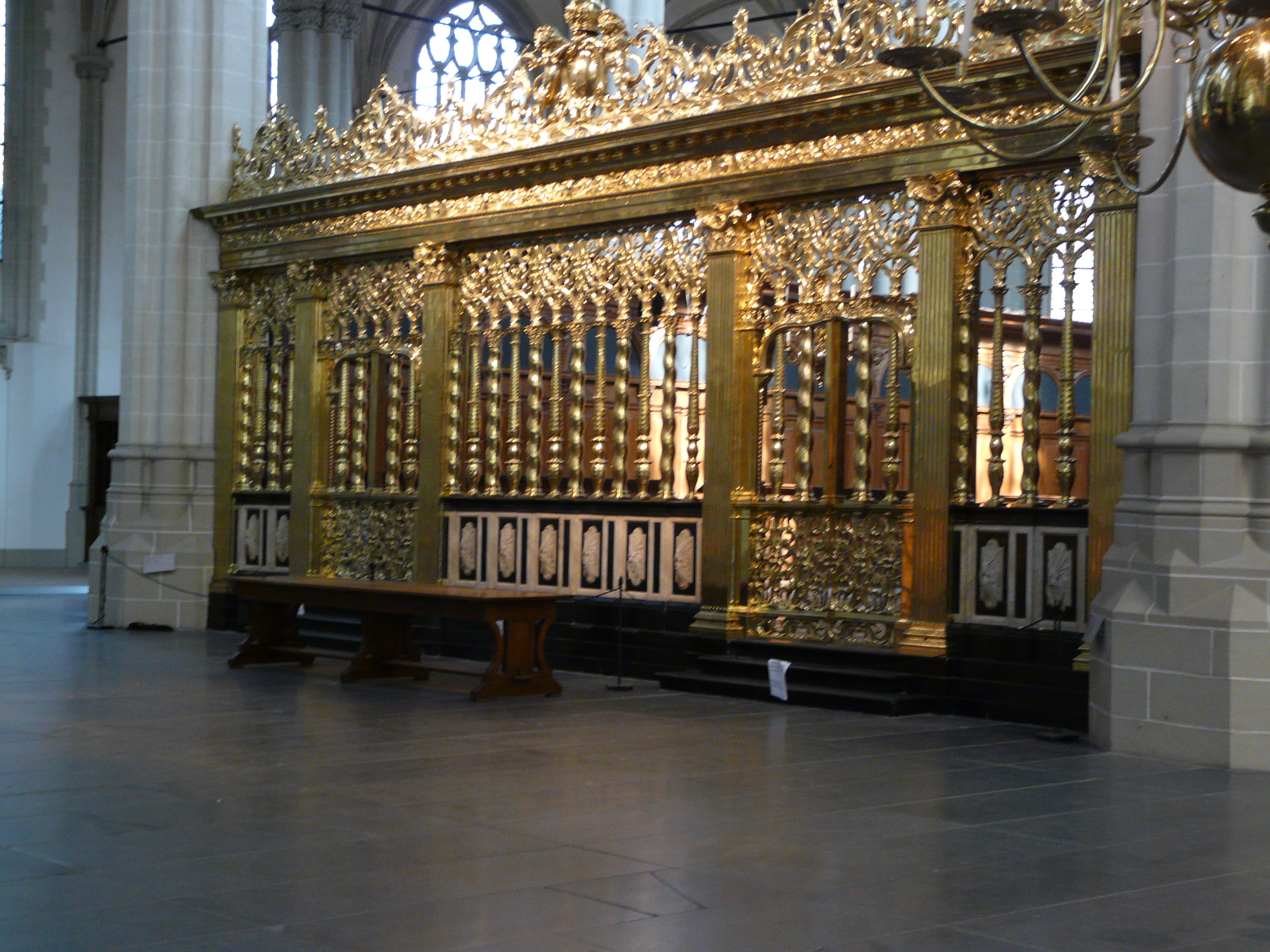
Choir screen in Nieuwe Kerk, Amsterdam

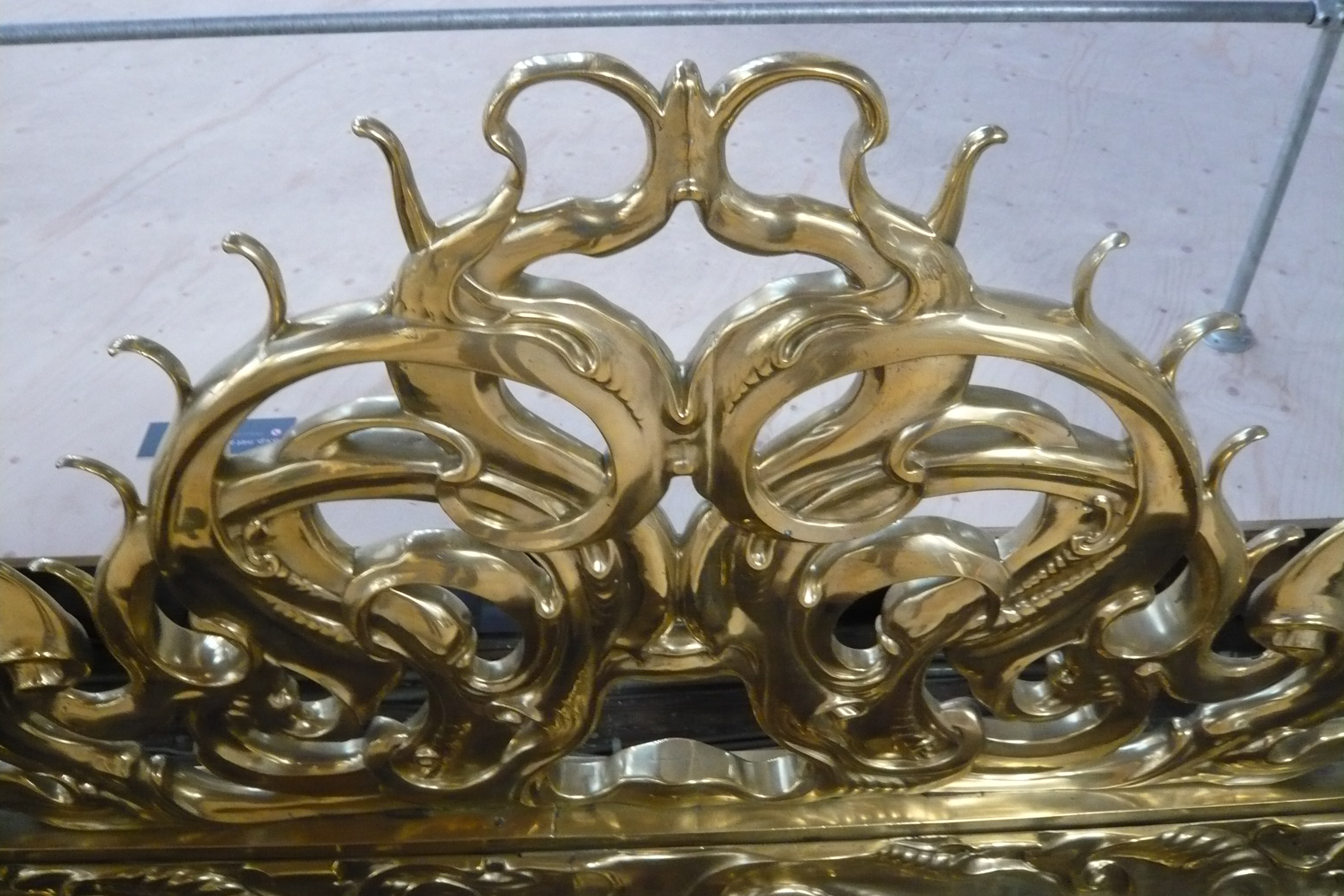
Detail of choir gate in auricular style

He was a pupil of Paulus van Vianen who was known for his auricular style in silver, so-called for its smooth, ear-like forms. After spending time in Paris (c. 1615), Lutma came to Amsterdam in 1621 where he got engaged on 31 March 1623 to Mayken Roelants, and on 18 May 1638 to Saera de Bie. He was a friend of Rembrandt, who later etched a portrait of him. The portrait shown here was painted by Jacob Adriaensz Backer. Lutma is best known for his choir-panel in the New Church of Amsterdam. A number of the designs of Lutma were later published in four series of prints, mainly by his sons Jacob and Johannes Lutma the Younger, more often known as Jan Lutma. Jan developed a distinct, if not very influential, technique of stipple engraving by making dots on the plate with a punch and hammer.

The Rijksmuseum of Amsterdam has several works of Johannes Lutma in its collection: two silver saltcontainers, partially gilded, a silver drinking-bowl and a silver pitcher and bowl with sea-motives.

In the Amsterdam neighbourhood De Pijp, as well as Schoonhoven, there are streets named after him.
