= Jun Shuang Huang =

- Born: 1988 or 1989 (age 35–36); Shanghai, China
- Occupation: Ballet dancer
- Height: 6 ft 3 in (1.91 m)
- Career
- Current group: Huang Dance Studio
- Former groups: Guangzhou Ballet、Houston Ballet

Jun Shuang Huang, also known as Junshuang Huang, is a Chinese professional ballet dancer who was formerly a principal dancer with Houston Ballet from 2010 to 2012 and was a Guest International Principal Dancer for eight months with the Queensland Ballet.

Born in Shanghai, China, Huang trained at the Shanghai Dance School for seven years. He received a Special Jury Prize finalist award at the Prix de Lausanne International Dance Competition in Switzerland, a Junior Third award at the 2005 Asia-Pacific Ballet Competition in Japan, and a Junior Silver award the 2006 Taoli Cup Dance Competition in China.

In 2008, he graduated from Shanghai Dance School and then joined the Guangzhou Ballet as a dancer. During that time he received awards from the 2008 Varna International Ballet Competition and the 2009 Helsinki International Ballet Competition. Huang joined Houston Ballet as a principal dancer in May 2010 and left Houston Ballet in 2012. He has also toured as a guest artist in the United States and Switzerland.

His repertoire includes ballets such as Swan Lake, La Bayadère, La Sylphide, Coppélia, Paquita, Le Corsaire, Don Quixote, and Diana and Actaeon.

Huang and his wife Xiaochen Chen, also a former dancer from the Guangzhou Ballet, operate the Huang Dance Studio in Houston.
