= Theodor van Kessel =

Flemish engraver, etcher, artist (c.1620–1696)

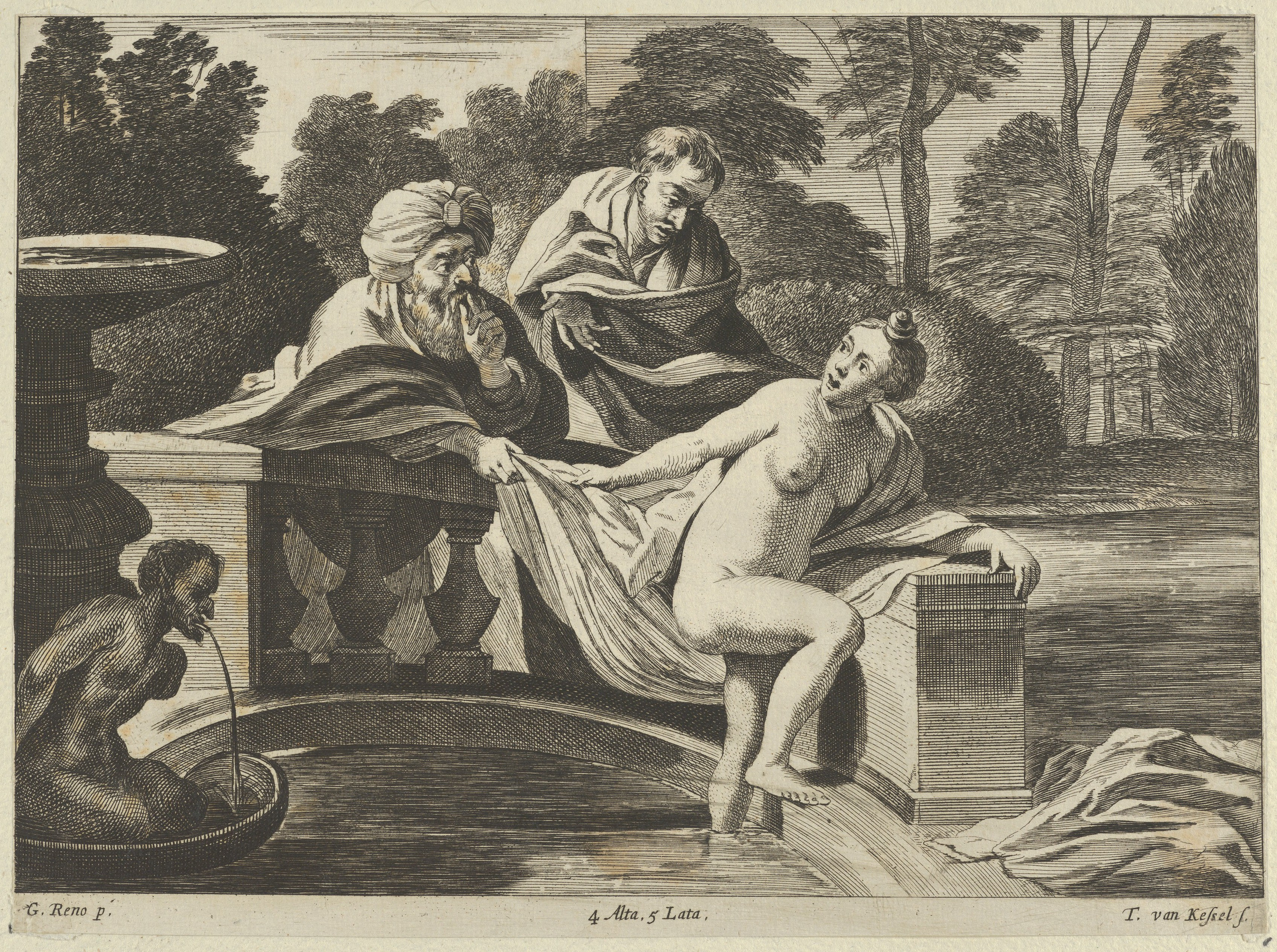
Susanna and the Elders, engraving after a modello by David Teniers after a painting by Guido Reni for the Theatrum Pictorium

Theodor van Kessel, Theodoor van Kessel or Theodorus van Kessel (1620 – 1696) was an engraver active in the Dutch Republic, Rome and Antwerp. He was one of the engravers who collaborated on the Theatrum Pictorium of David Teniers the Younger.

== Life ==
Little is known of his early life. He may have worked in Utrecht in the Dutch Republic around 1638, although this may have been an artist with the same name. He is recorded as working in Rome where he inscribed his name in the catacombs of Domitilla, in the crypt of David. His presence in Antwerp is firmly established in 1652 where he was active until around 1660.

== Work ==
He is known for several series of prints after other artists; among them are 10 plates of animals he made in 1654 for Jan van den Hecke entitled Alcune Animali. Van den Hecke was at the time court painter and curator for the governor of the Habsburg Netherlands, the Archduke Leopold Wilhelm. After van den Hecke died, Teniers succeeded him in the position of court painter and curator. This is probably how van Kessel came to work for him.

== Selected works ==
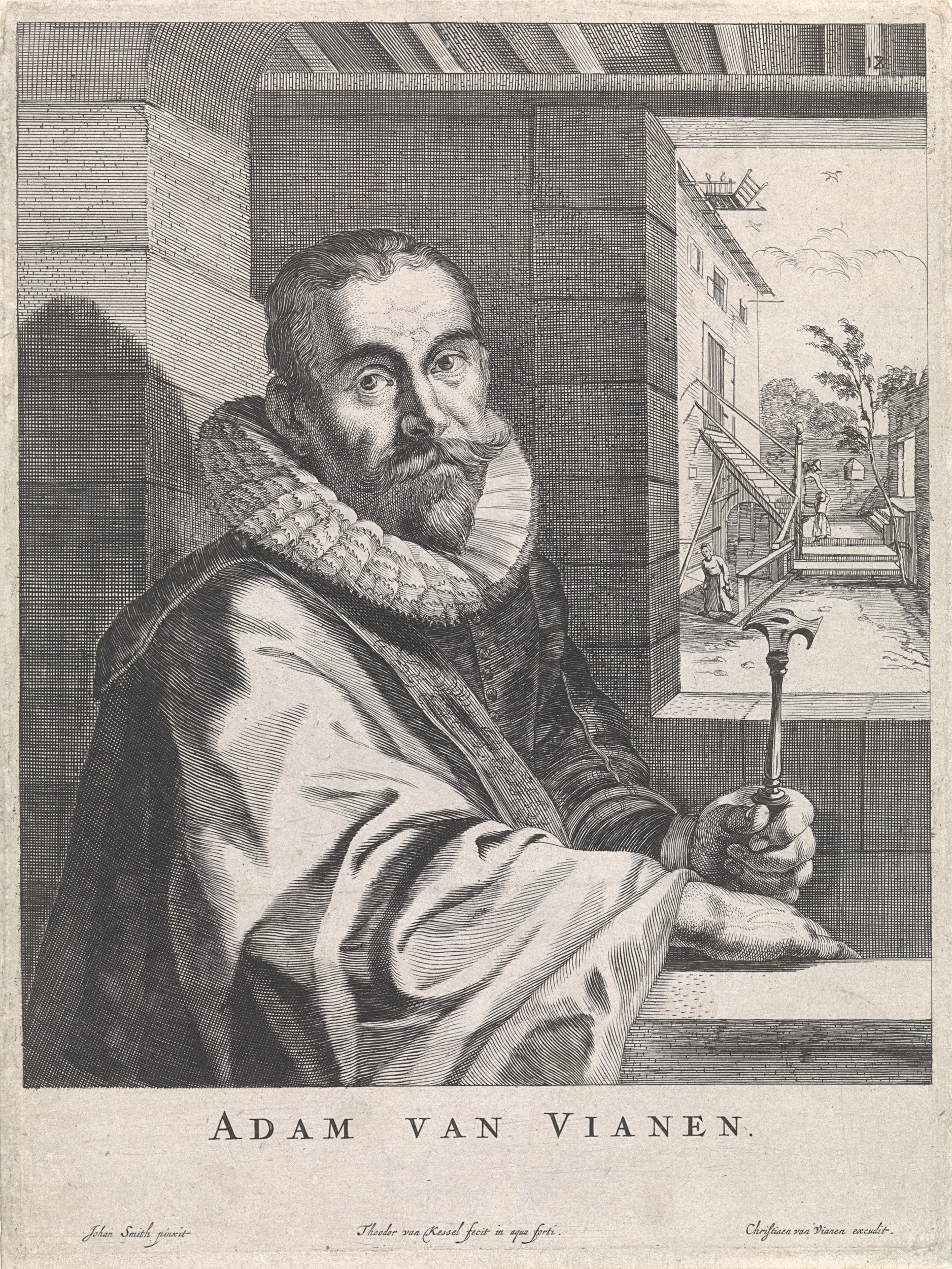
Portrait of Adam van Vianen, from the book with 48 plates by Van Kessel for Vianen's son Christiaen van Vianen

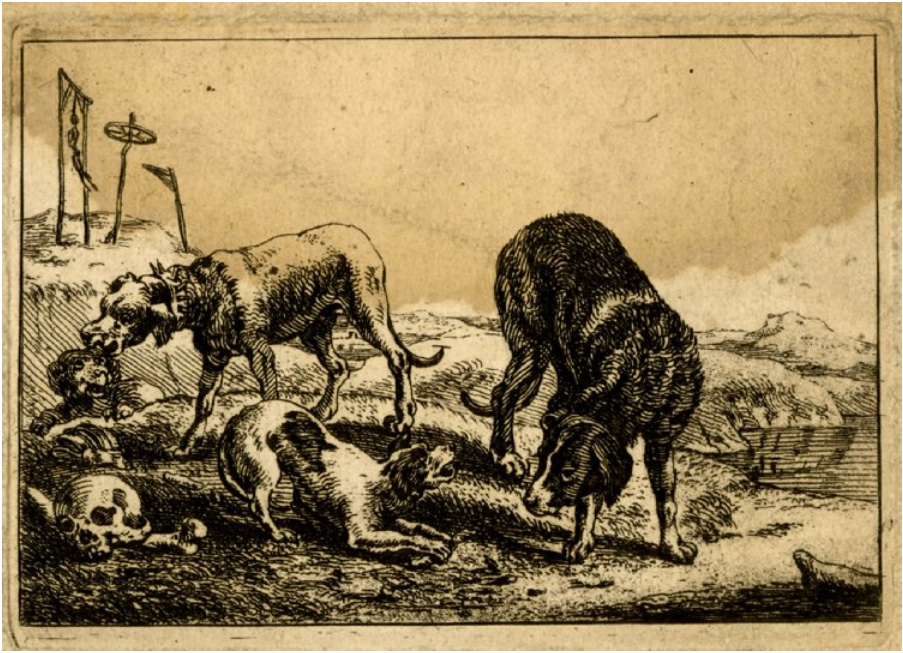
Landscape with Four Dogs, from Alcune Animali
