= Adam van Vianen =

Dutch silversmith

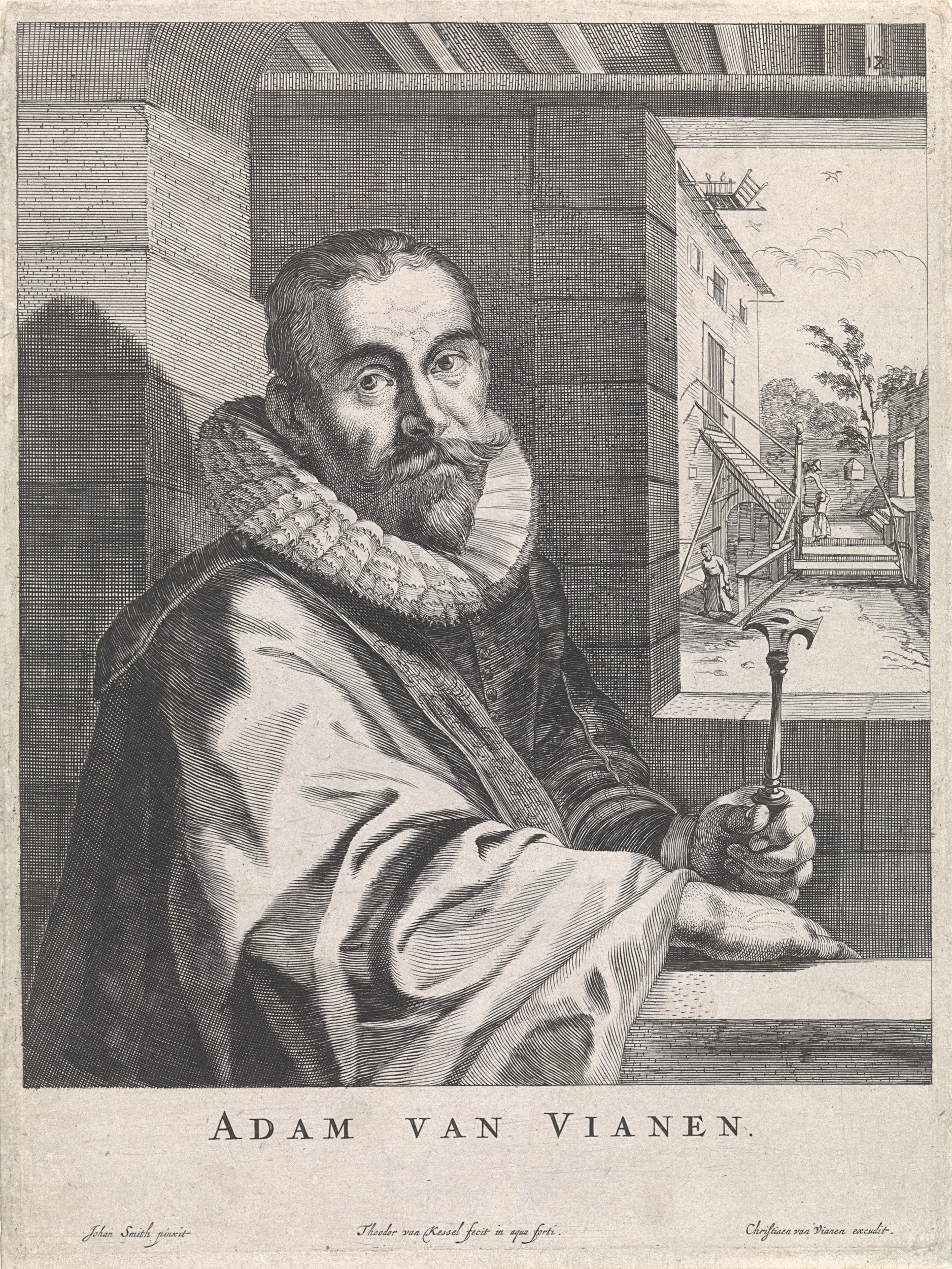
Adam van Vianen with a hammer in hand, by his son Christiaen and the engraver Theodorus van Kessel

Adam van Vianen (1568–1627) was a leading silversmith of the early Dutch Golden Age, who trained as an engraver and was also a medallist. Unlike his brother Paul van Vianen, he spent little time away from his native Utrecht. Together they developed the auricular style which bridges the gap between Northern Mannerist and Baroque ornament.

== Biography ==
Van Vianen was born and died in Utrecht. He was the oldest son of Willem Eerstensz. van Vianen, the brother of Paulus Willemsz. van Vianen and the father of Christian van Vianen. He probably trained with a local goldsmith, learning engraving, as most goldsmiths did. A handful of prints can be identified as his, including two portraits and a map of Utrecht. His earliest surviving piece of silver is a standing cup of 1594, now in the Hermitage Museum.

On 12 October 1593, he married Aeltgen Verhorst, with whom he had a son. After his wife's death, he married Catharina van Wapenveldt, with whom he had three children. He is believed to have died on 25 or 26 August 1627. Adam van Vianen's son Christiaen van Vianen was considered to be his father's equal in skill, according to Joachim von Sandrart.

He became known along with his brother for the auricular style of cartilaginous arabesques in baroque art. According to some, Paulus designed them and Adam transformed them into three-dimensional objects.

== Memorial ewer of 1614 ==
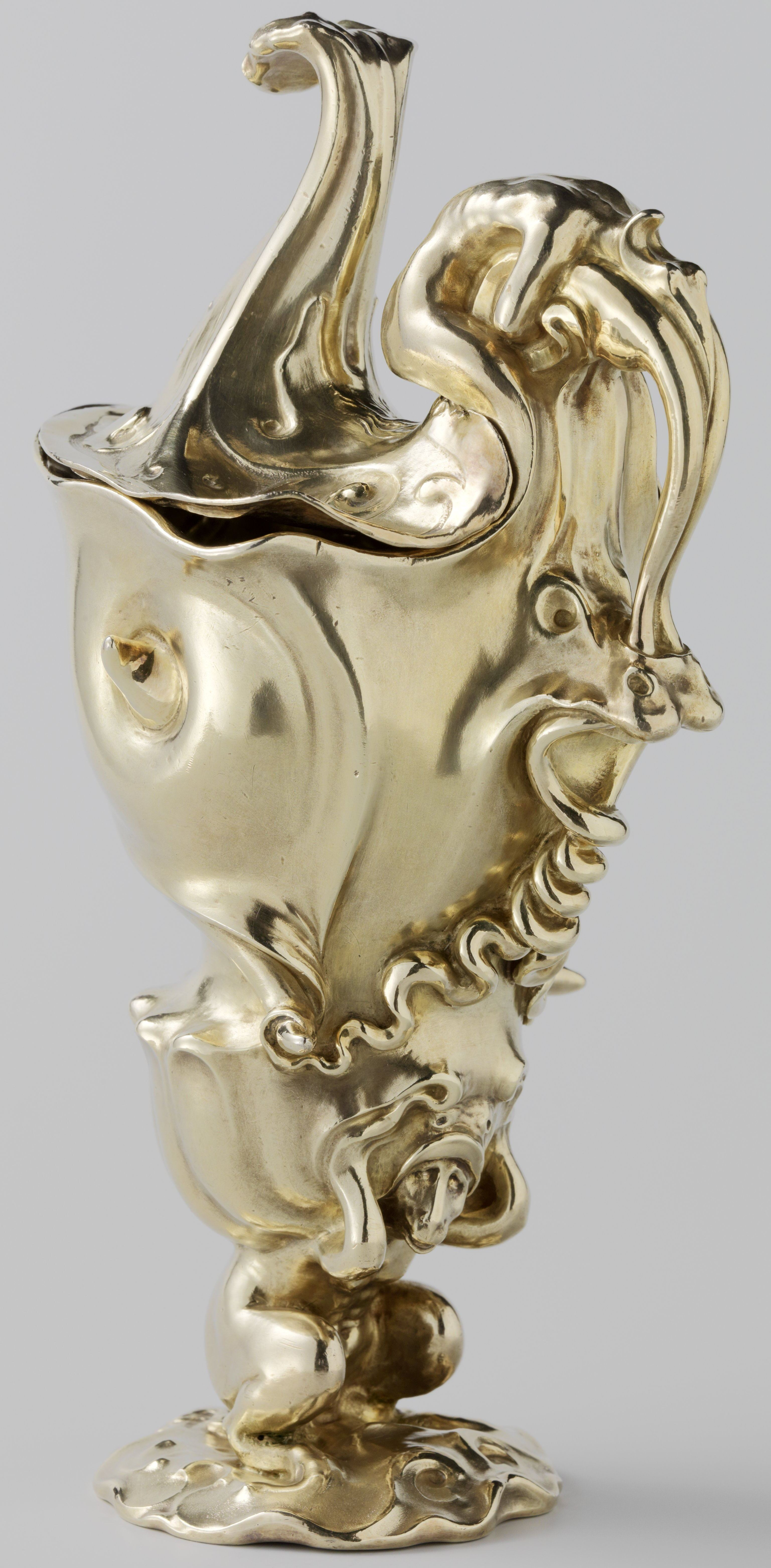
Memorial gilded ewer of 1614

Especially important is a gilded ewer of 1614 in the Rijksmuseum. This is "a strikingly original work that is largely abstract and completely sculptural in its conception", and was commissioned by the Amsterdam goldsmiths' guild to commemorate the death of Paul in 1613, despite neither brother living in Amsterdam or being a member of the guild. The piece became famous and appears in several Dutch Golden Age paintings, both still lifes and history paintings, "no doubt in part because its bizarre form allowed it to pass as an object from an ancient and foreign land", and so useful for Old Testament scenes and the like.

According to James Trilling, it "is one of the very few ornamental works that deserve recognition as art-historical turning points. Van Vianen's breakthrough was the introduction of inchoate or indeterminate form, which paved the way for both Rococo and modernist ornament." It was raised by a lengthy process of chasing from a single sheet of silver, and chasing was the main technique used in auricular silver.

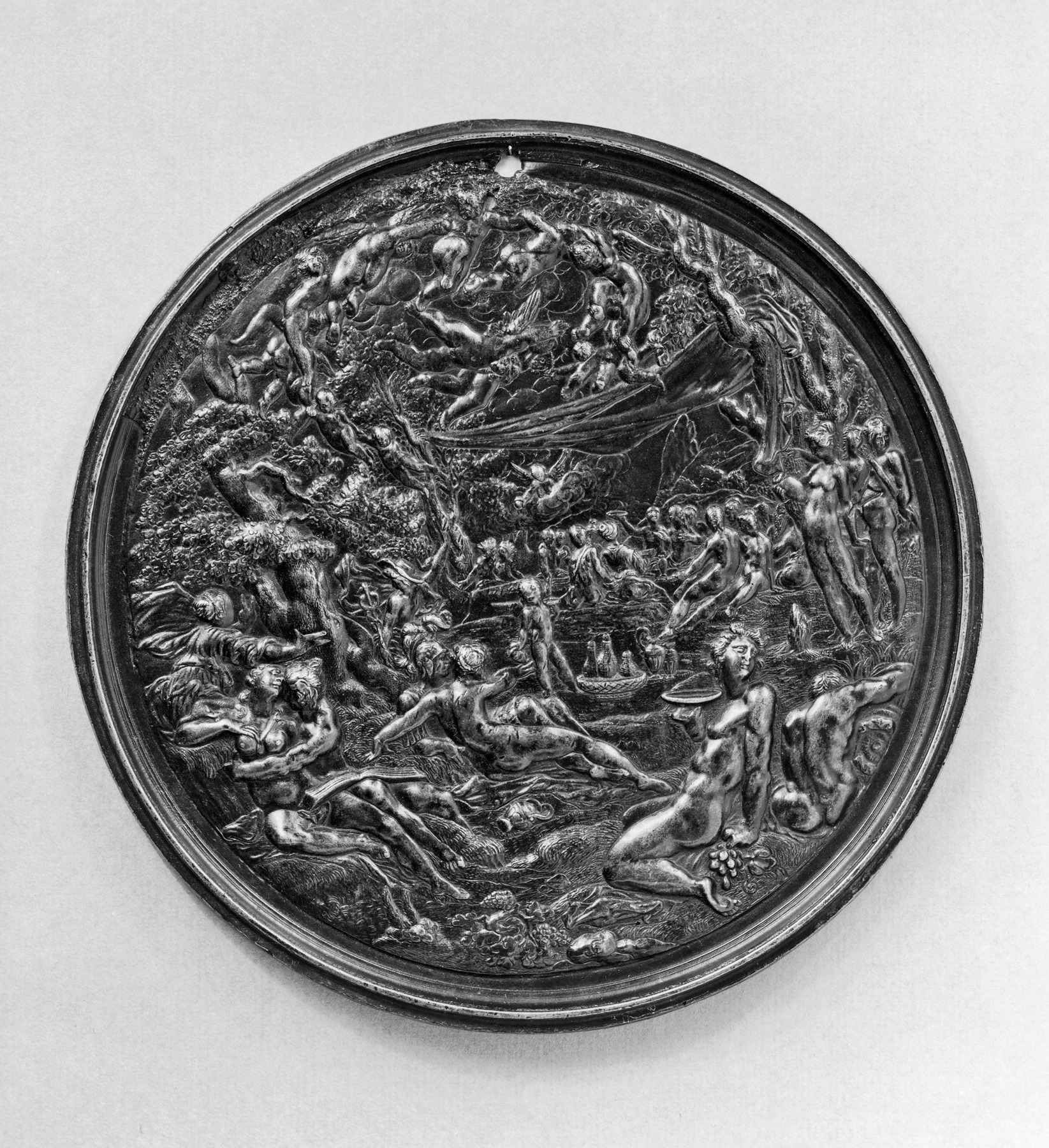
Plaquette with the Wedding of Peleus and Thetis after Abraham Bloemaert
