= The Adoration of the Shepherds (Paulus van Vianen) =

Silver plaquette by Paulus van Vianen

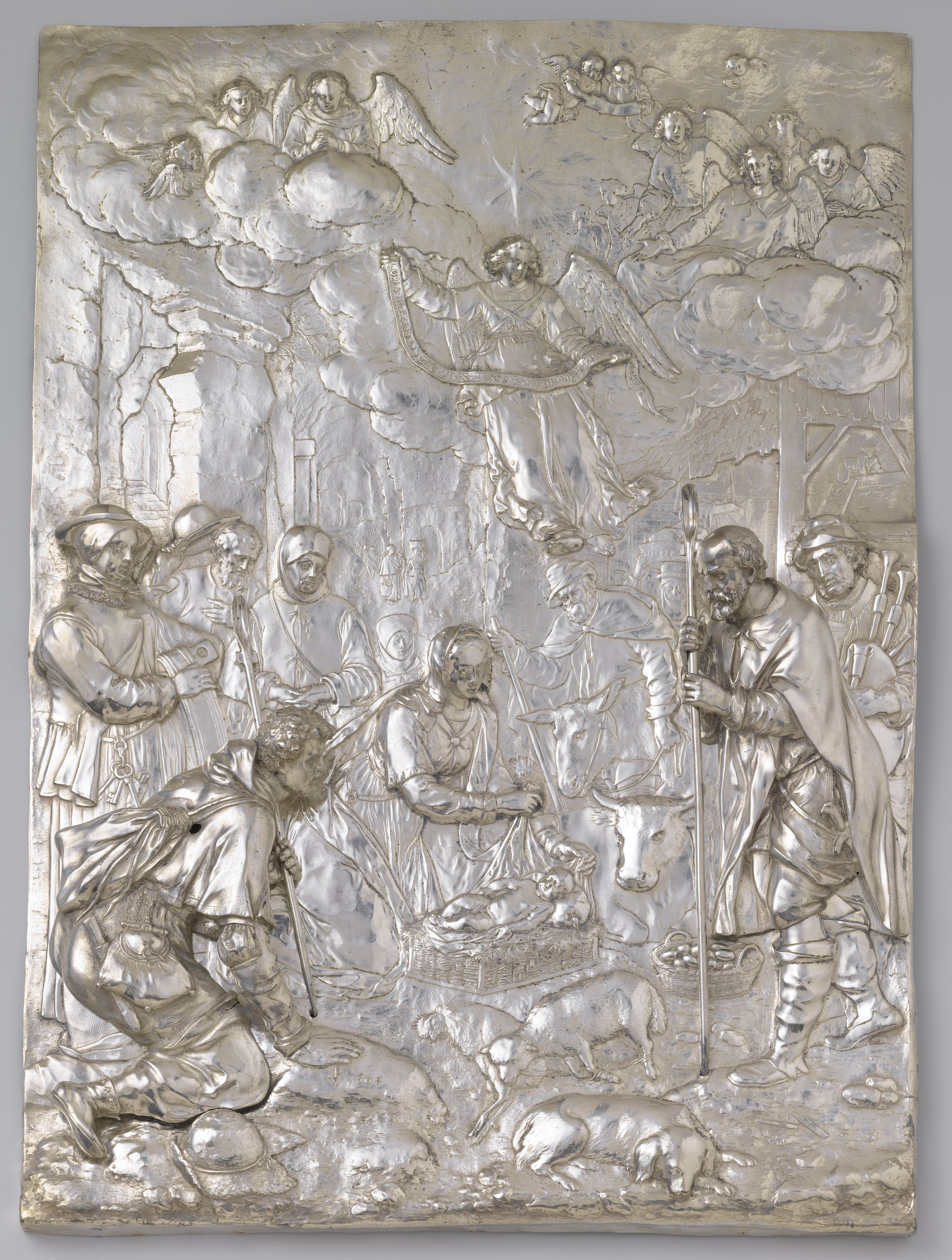
- Artist: Paulus van Vianen
- Year: 1607
- Medium: Oil on panel
- Dimensions: 31.9 cm × 22.7 cm (12.6 in × 8.9 in)
- Location: Rijksmuseum, Amsterdam

The Adoration of the Shepherds is a 1607 silver plaquette by the Dutch Golden Age sculptor Paulus van Vianen in the collection of the Rijksmuseum.

The scene is the Adoration of the Shepherds. Mary sits with her child beneath angels surrounded by onlookers. She is flanked by two shepherds who lean forward towards the Child Jesus. They seem to pop out of the scene and have been separately cast and added to the finished chased and hammered plaquette. It was made during the artist's period at the court of Rudolf II in Prague and was purchased in 1979 with support from the Vereniging Rembrandt and the Rijksmuseum-Stichting.

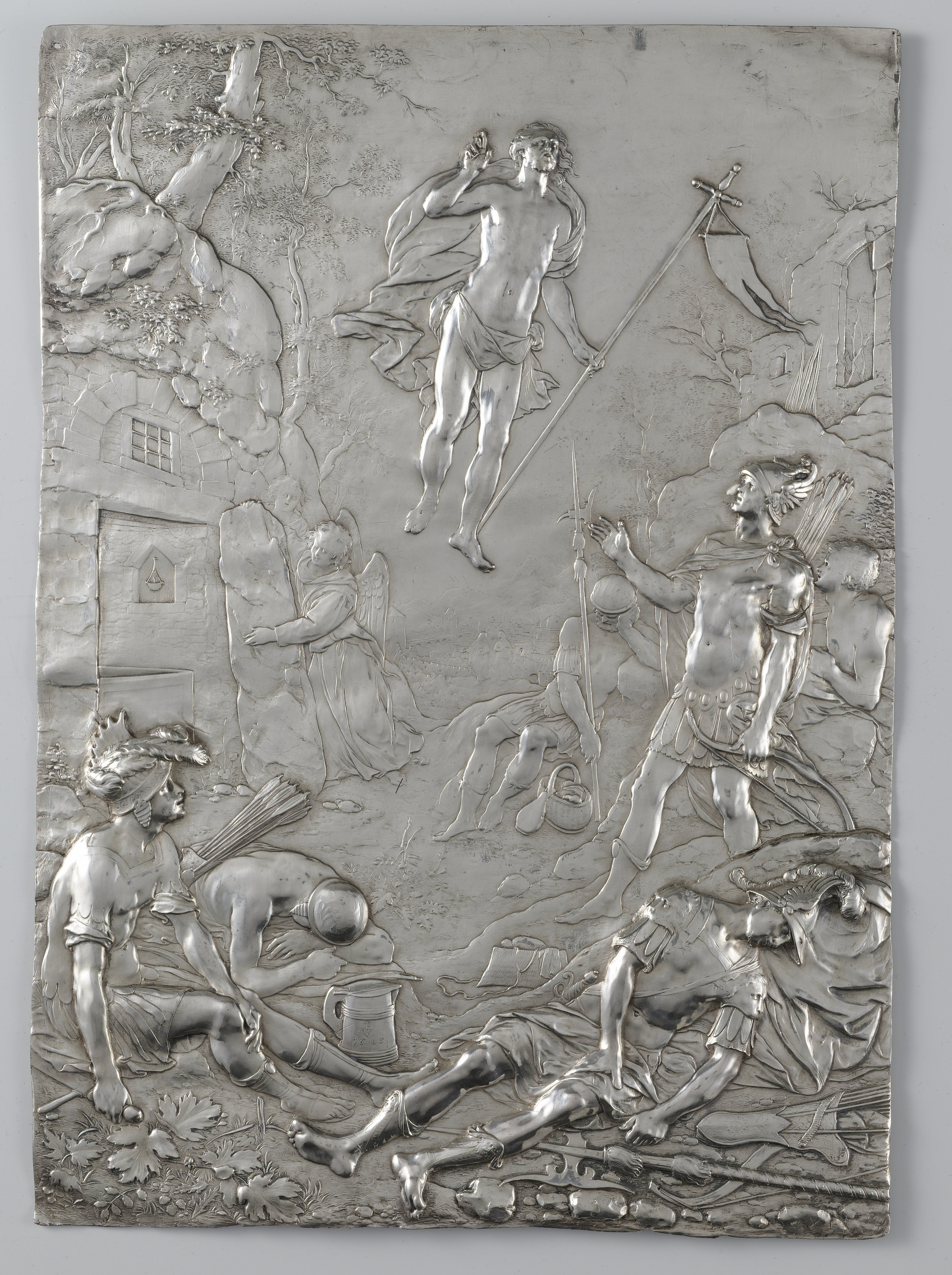
Silver plaquette of the Resurrection of Christ, also in the collection of the Rijksmuseum

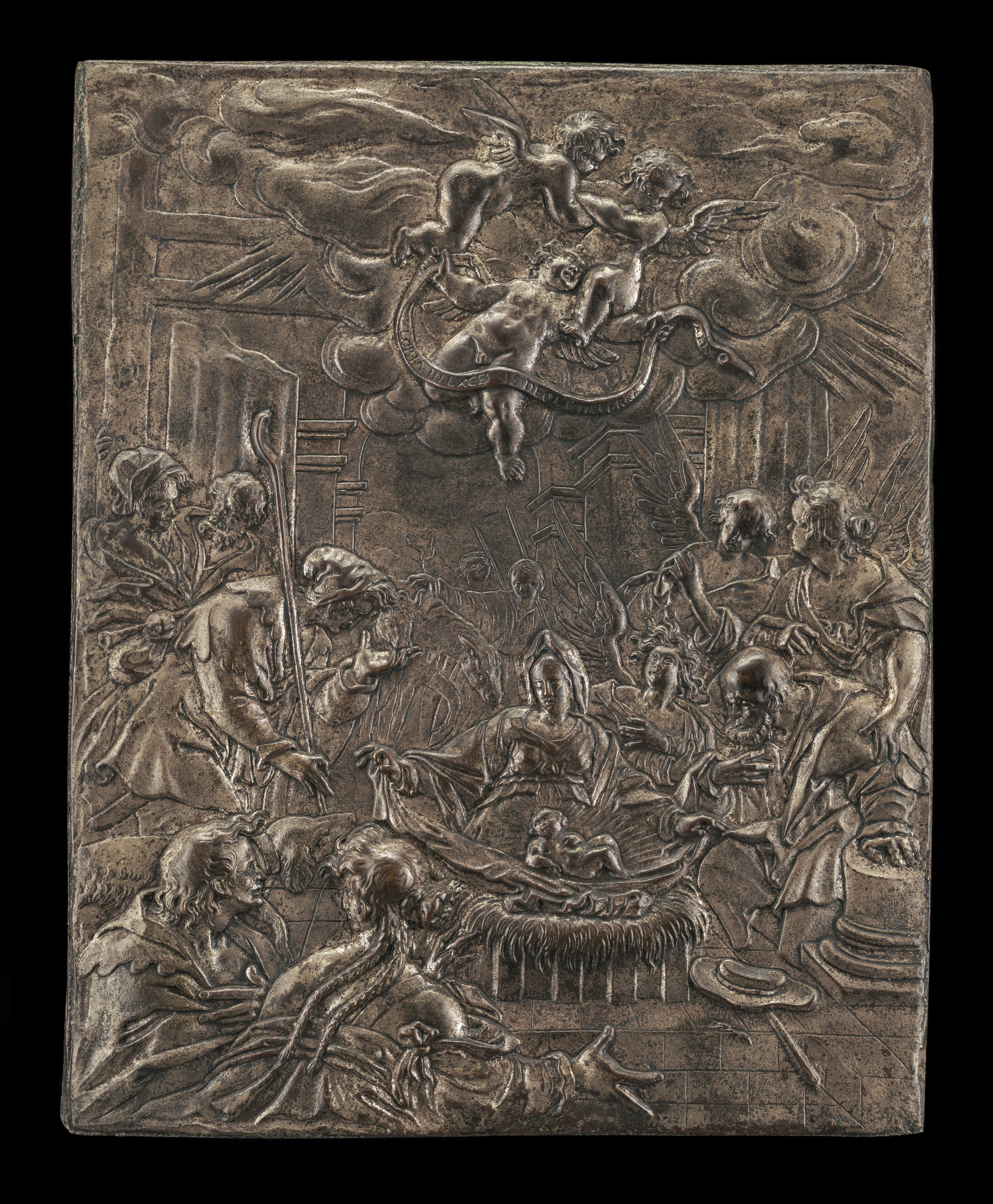
Bronze variation of the Adoration of the Shepherds, in the collection of the National Gallery of Art
