= Paul van Vianen =

Dutch silversmith, medallist and sculptor

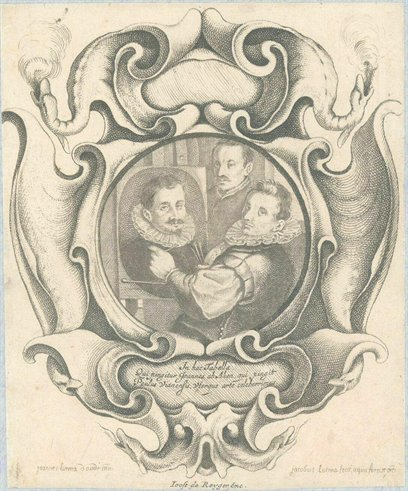
Portrait of Paul van Vianen (portrayed as being painted by Hans von Aachen), engraving after an original painting by Hans von Aachen and adorned with an ornamental frame in auricular style

Paul van Vianen or Paulus Willemsz van Vianen (1570–1614) was a silversmith, medallist and sculptor of the Northern Netherlands, trained in Northern Mannerism but then important in developing the Baroque auricular style with his brother Adam van Vianen.

== Biography ==
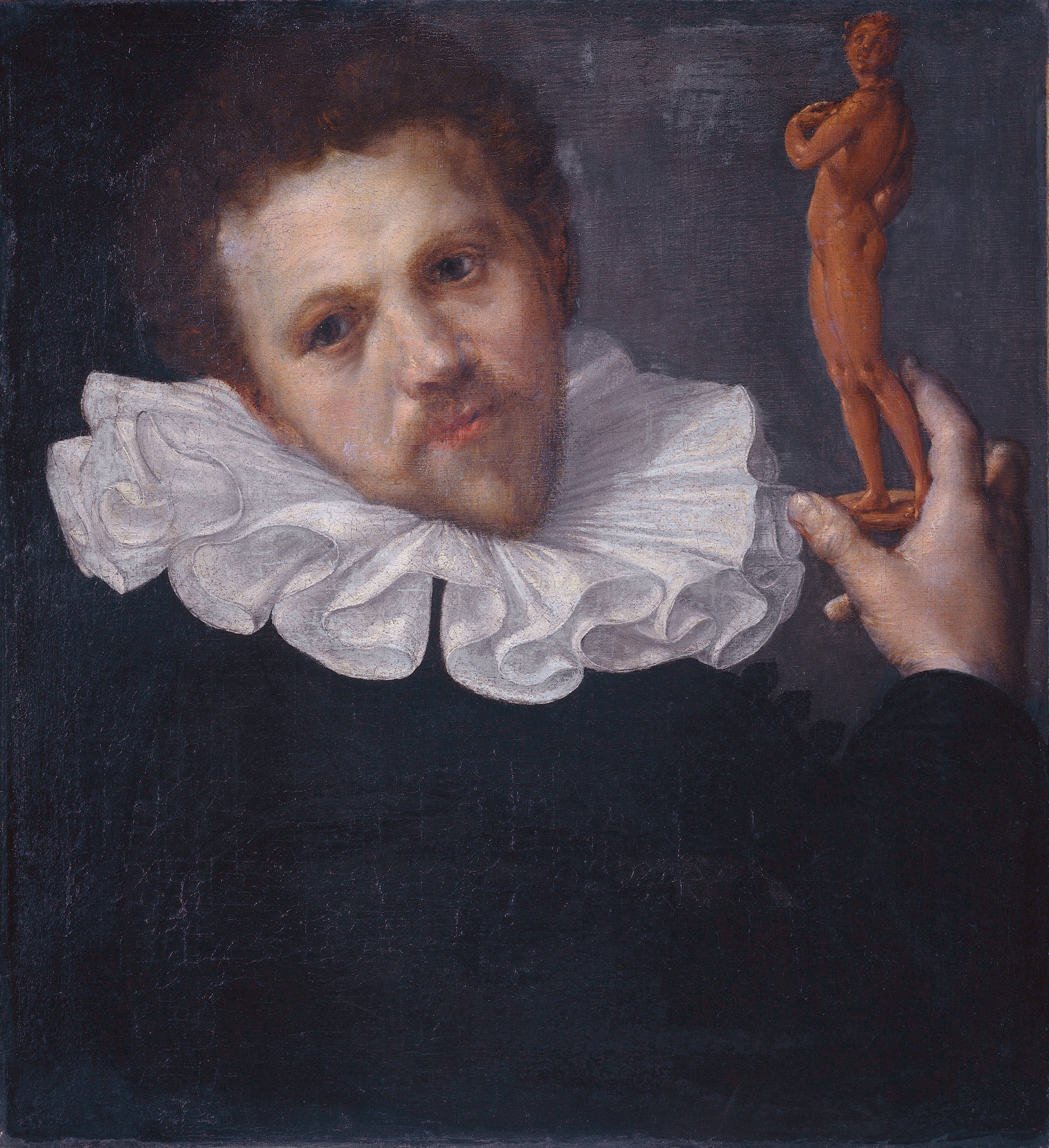
Portrait of Paulus van Vianen holding one of his creations, by Cornelis Ketel

Vianen was born in Utrecht. According to the RKD, he travelled to Italy and only moved to Prague in the last decade of his life, but for that reason he is known as a member of the Prague school of art under Rudolf II, Holy Roman Emperor. He was the son of Willem van Vianen, brother of Adam van Vianen, the father of Paulus II, and the uncle of Adam II and his brother Christian van Vianen.

His works include the 1613 Diana and Actaeon bowl, now in the Rijksmuseum in Amsterdam. Besides his work as a medallist and sculptor, he was also a landscape draughtsman and created several drawings of allegorical scenes in pastoral landscapes. He died in Prague.

== Works ==
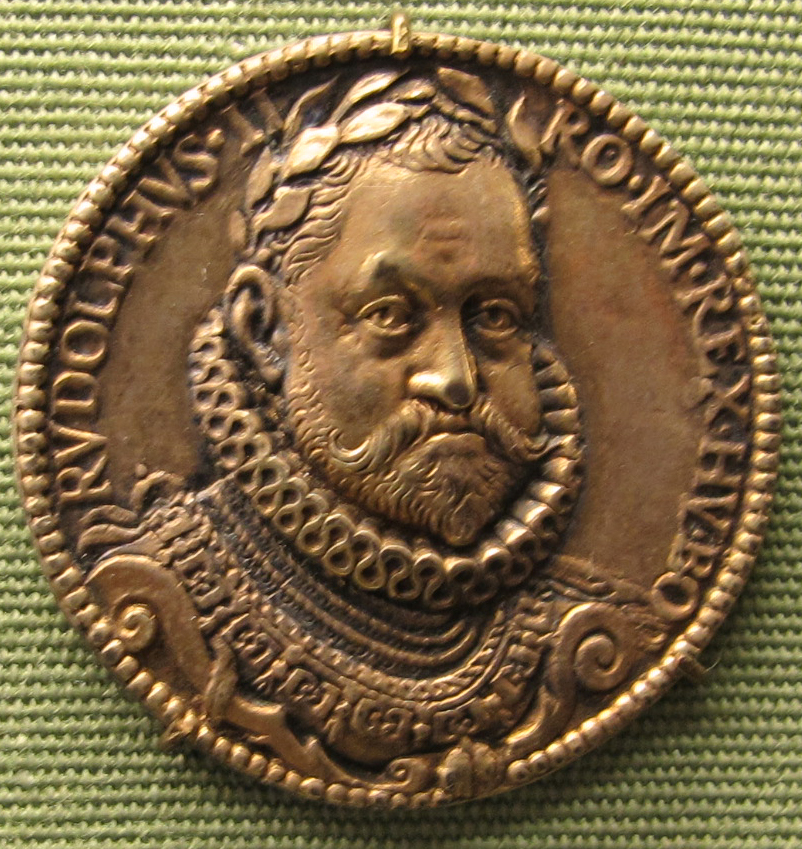
Medal of Rudolf II in 1576

- The Adoration of the Shepherds (Paulus van Vianen), based on the Adoration of the Shepherds during the Birth of Jesus
