= Lomellini Ewer and Basin =

Ewer and basin

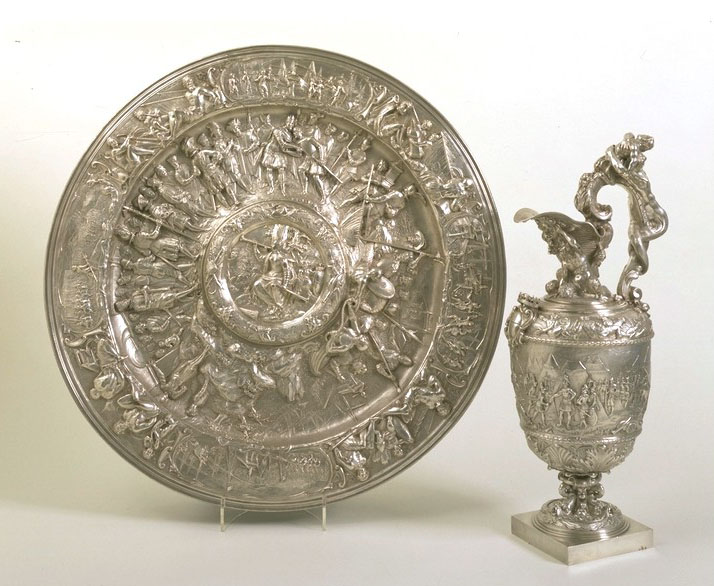
Lomellini Ewer and Basin, 1621-1622 V&A Museum no. M.11&A-1974

This silver ewer and basin, now in the Victoria and Albert Museum in London, was originally part of a set of six. They were made in 1621 to 1622 and are decorated with episodes from the life of Giovanni Grimaldi, who was a member of one of the most important aristocratic families in 17th century Genoa. The ewer depicts an event in the Wars in Lombardy, the battle of the River Po in 1431, at which Giovanni commanded the Milanese fleet against the Venetians. Also prominent on the set are the arms of the Lomellini, another highly influential Genoese family whose wealth was partly founded on trade in coral. There is no documentary evidence for the commission but the two dynasties shared trading interests and were related by marriage. It may be that the pieces were made for the House of Grimaldi but later passed on the Lomellini, perhaps as a wedding gift or to mark a business transaction. Objects such as these were deliberately designed to be admired rather than used. The sculptural decoration of the set, in particular with writing handle and shell lip of the ewer, reflects the taste for marine and grotesque ornament that was fashionable in the sixteenth and seventeenth centuries.

It has been suggested that the goldsmith may have used drawings by Lavazzo Tavarone (1556–1641), who worked on the frescoes in the Palazzo Grimaldi. Both pieces bear the mark of Genoa but were probably the work of a Flemish goldsmith, Giovanni Aelbosca Belga. It was not unusual for Flemish goldsmiths to be working in Genoa at this time as a large colony of Flemish artists also resided there in the early 17th century.
