= Christiaen van Vianen =

Dutch silversmith and draughtsman

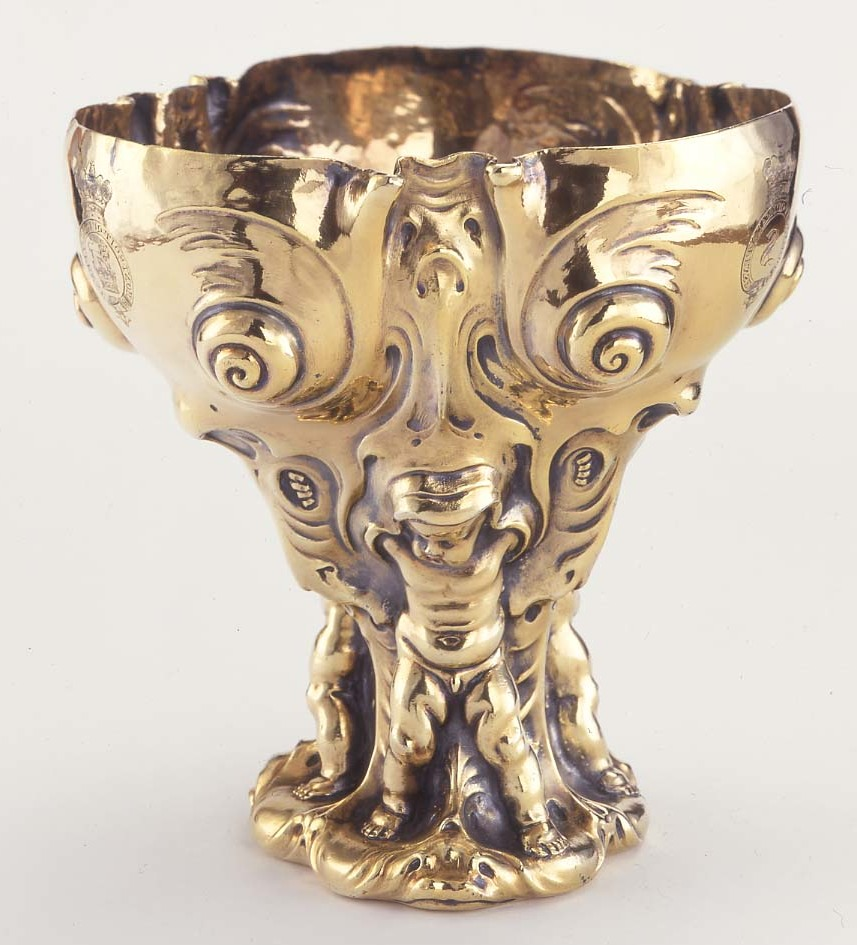
Christian van Vianen, Standing cup, 1640–41, Waddesdon Manor

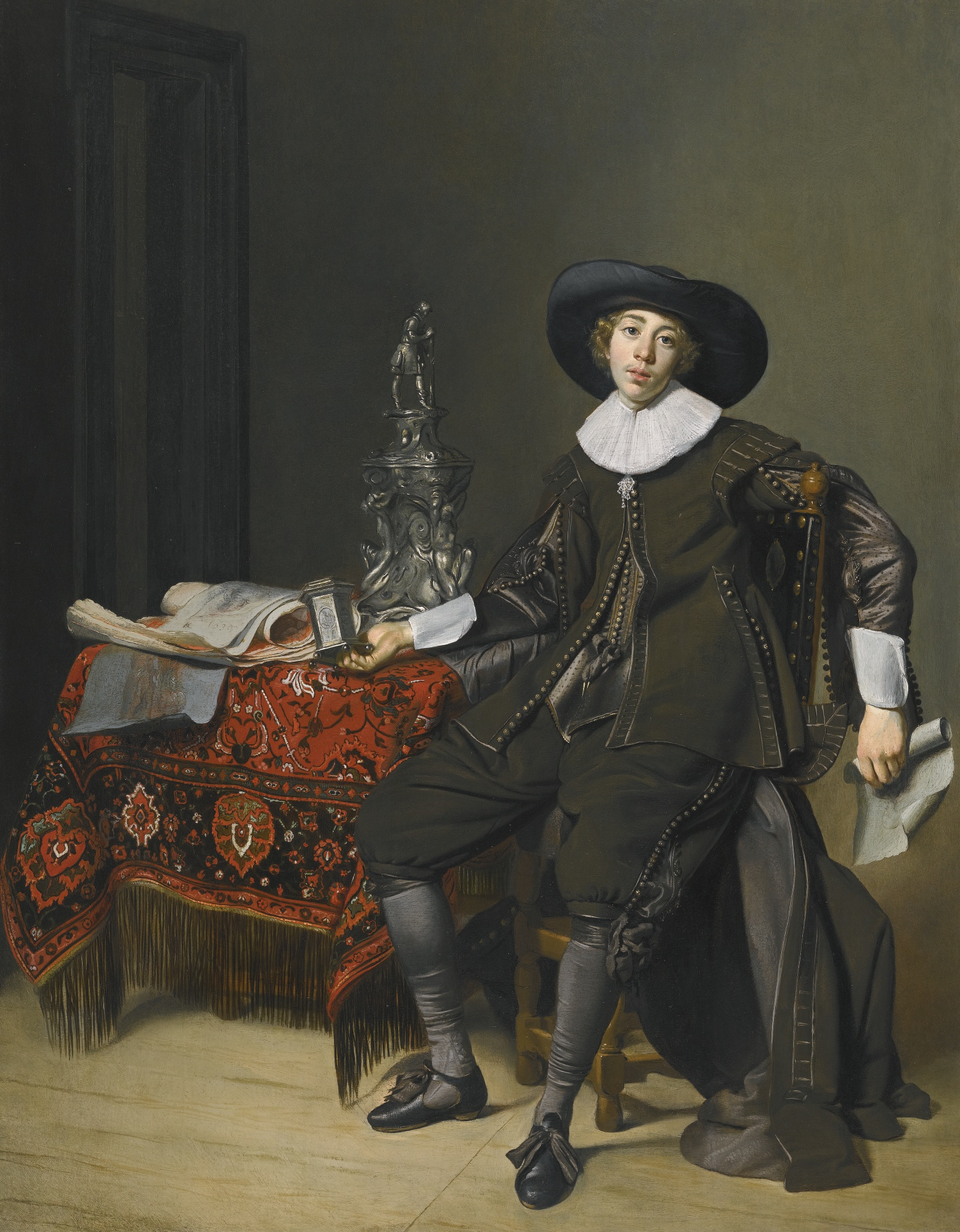
Thomas de Keyser, Portrait of a Young Silversmith, possibly van Vianen, 1630

Christiaen van Vianen (1598–1671) was a Dutch silversmith and draughtsman. He was the son of Adam van Vianen and worked in his father's auricular style as a silversmith and designer, also working in Germany and England.

In 1630 he moved to London and set up a successful workshop in Westminster, soon employing nine Dutch silversmiths. His was "the largest alien workshop in London at a time when there were identifiably about 200 foreign goldsmiths, jewellers and engravers working there". As a foreigner he was not allowed to hallmark his pieces, and so often signed them. A basin, no doubt matching a ewer that is now lost, is dated 1635 and is now in the Victoria and Albert Museum in London, known as the "Silver Dolphin Basin" or "Dolphin Bowl".

In the 1640s he employed the engraver Theodor van Kessel to make a book about his father's designs, called Modelli Artificiosi di Vasi diversi d'argento et altre Opere capriciozi. These plates were later reworked in the 1650s into Constige modellen van verscheyden silvere vaten en andere sinnighe werken, gevonden ende geteekend door den vermaarden Adam van Vianen, sijnde meerendeels door hem uyt één stuk silver geslagen, uytgegeven door synen soon Christiaen van Vianen tot Utrecht, ende in cooper geetst door Theodor van Kessel.
