= Diana and Actaeon =

Classical Greek myth

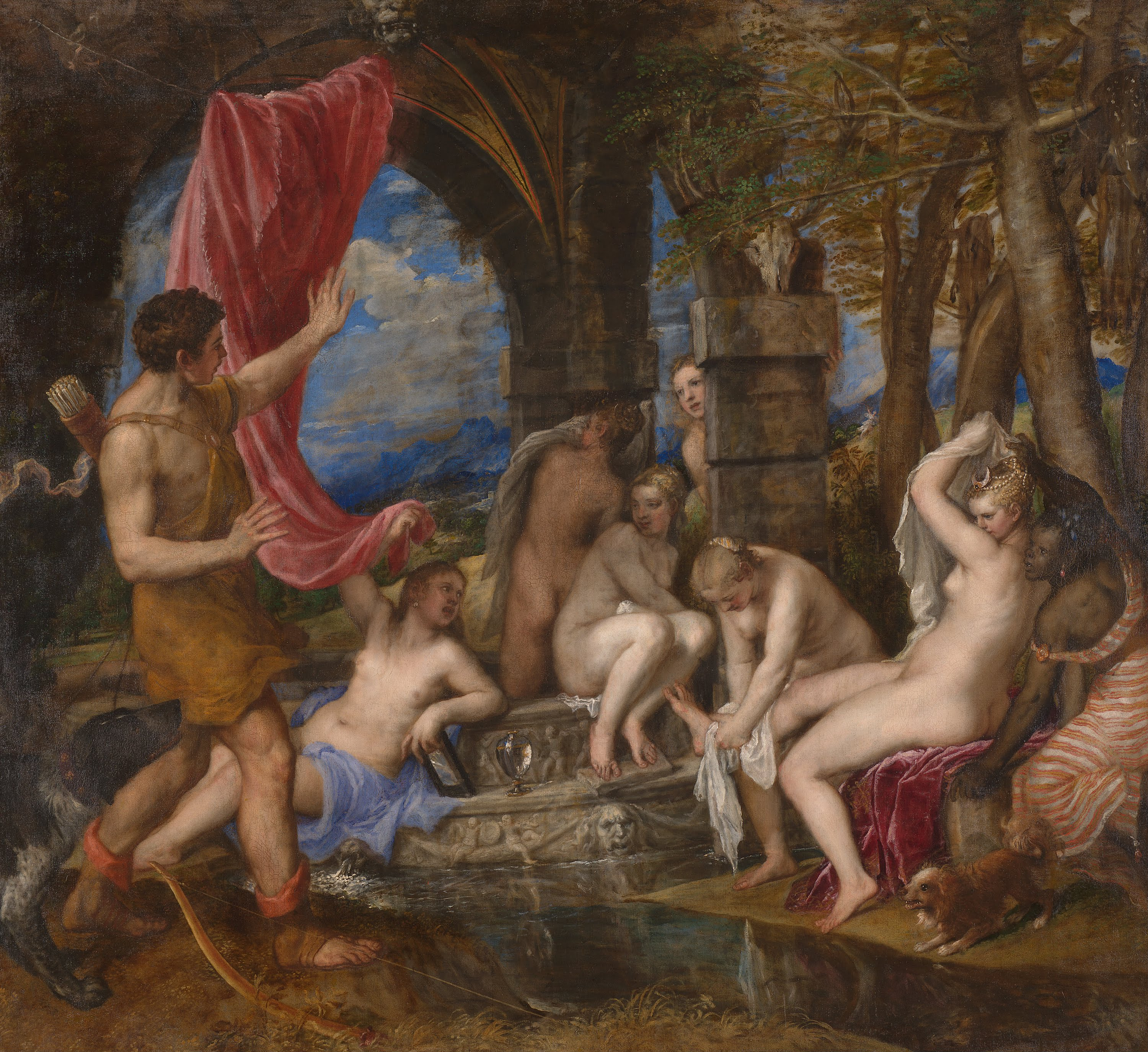
Diana and Actaeon by Titian; the moment of surprise

The myth of Diana and Actaeon can be found in Ovid's Metamorphoses. The tale recounts the fate of a young hunter named Actaeon, who was a grandson of Cadmus, and his encounter with chaste Artemis, known to the Romans as Diana, goddess of the hunt. The latter is nude and enjoying a bath in a spring with help from her escort of nymphs when the mortal man unwittingly stumbles upon the scene. The nymphs scream in surprise and attempt to cover Diana, who, in a fit of embarrassed fury, splashes water upon Actaeon. He is transformed into a deer with a dappled hide and long antlers, robbed of his ability to speak, and thereafter promptly flees in fear. It is not long, however, before his own hounds track him down and kill him, failing to recognize their master.

== Art ==
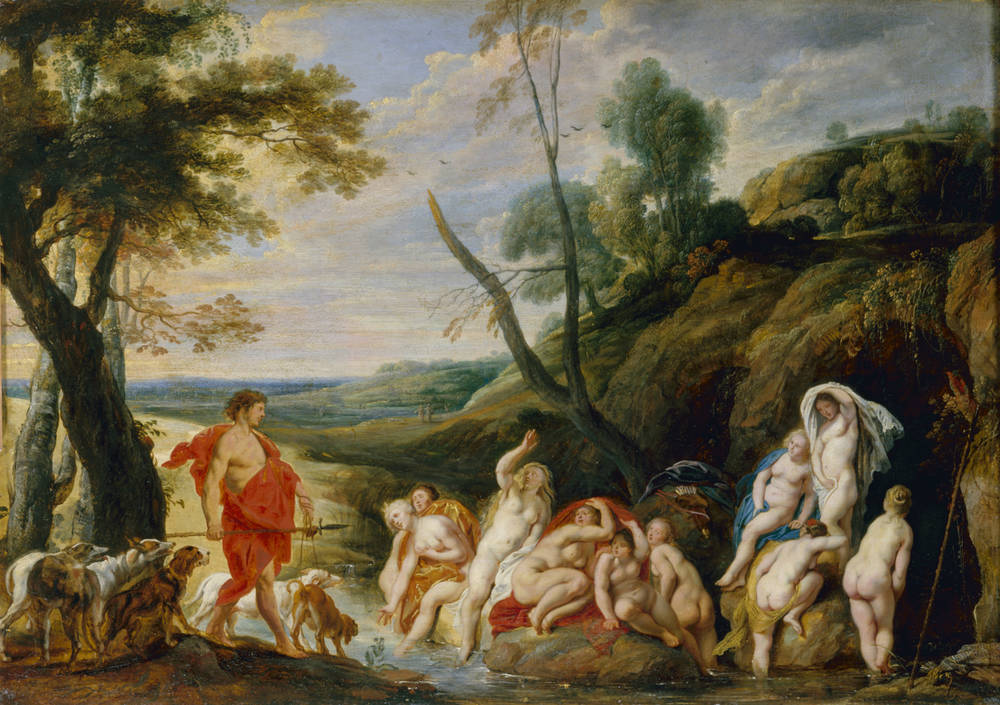
Diana and Actaeon by Jacob Jordaens

The story became very popular in the Renaissance. The most common scene shown was Actaeon surprising Diana, but his transformation and his death were also sometimes shown. Titian painted the first two scenes in two of his greatest late poesies for Philip II of Spain, in Diana and Actaeon and The Death of Actaeon. The latter actually shows the transformation still in progress; like many depictions the head is shown transformed, but most of the body remains human. Less often Actaeon is fully transformed when caught by his dogs. The story was popular on Italian Renaissance maiolica.

In Matthew Barney's 2019 film Redoubt set in the Sawtooth Mountains of the U.S. state of Idaho and an accompanying traveling art exhibition originating at the Yale University Art Gallery the myth is retold by the visual artist and filmmaker via avenues of his own design.

Diane and Actaeon's myth has also deeply inspired the French film/theatre director, writer and visual artist Jean Michel Bruyère and his collective LFKs, who produced a series of 600 shorts and "medium" films, an interactive 360° installation, Si poteris narrare licet ("if you are able to speak of it, then you may do so") in 2002, a 3D 360° installation La Dispersion du Fils (from 2008 to 2016) and an outdoor performance, Une Brutalité pastorale (2000) all about the myth of Diana and Actaeon.

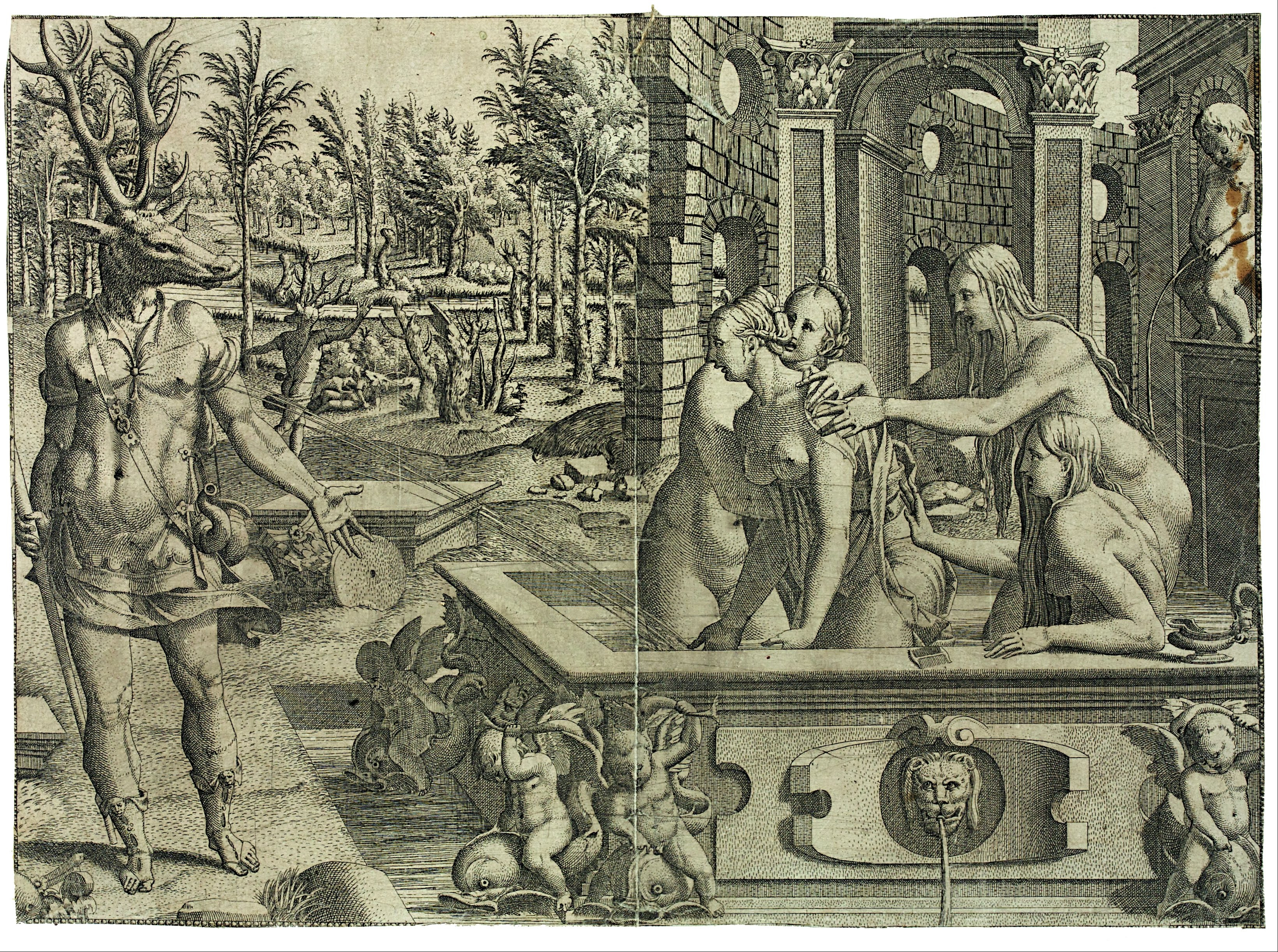
Print by Jean Mignon, The Transformation of Actaeon, with his pursuit and death shown in the background

== Ballet ==
The origins of the Diana and Actaeon Pas de Deux, a divertissement created for a 1935 version of La Esmeralda, lie in two earlier ballet productions. The first of these was Tsar Kandavl or Le Roi Candaule, premiered in 1868 by the Imperial Russian Ballet in Saint Petersburg. Based on a story told by Herodotus in his Histories, this four-act ballet, choreographed by Marius Petipa to music by Cesare Pugni, included a pas de trois for dancers portraying Diana, the Roman goddess of the moon, the hunt, and chastity; Endymion, a beautiful shepherd, and a Satyr. This divertissement told of a poetic encounter in which Diana (or Selene, another name for the moon goddess) looked down upon the sleeping youth, descended to earth, kissed him, and fell in love. In a production mounted in the early twentieth century, Anna Pavlova was among those who danced Diana, and Vaslav Nijinsky appeared as the Satyr. In 1917, George Balanchine, then Balanchivadze, also danced the role of the Satyr, with Lydia Ivanova as Diana and Nicholas Efimov as Endymion.

In 1886, Petipa incorporated a new pas de deux, set to music by Riccardo Drigo, into his production of Pugni's La Esmeralda for the Maryinsky Ballet, as the Imperial Russian Ballet had come to be called. This pas de deux was based on the Greek myth of Artemis (predecessor to the Roman Diana), in her aspect of virgin goddess of the hunt, and Actaeon, a Theban hero. According to Ovid's Metamorphoses, Actaeon, out on a hunt, stumbled upon Artemis while she was bathing at a spring. Outraged and embarrassed that he had seen her naked, she punished him by destroying his power of speech and turning him into a stag, with antlers and a shaggy coat. In deer form, he was torn to pieces by his own hunting dogs, whipped into a raging fury by Artemis.

In 1935, Agrippina Vaganova staged a new production of La Esmeralda for the Kirov Ballet in Leningrad, as the company and the city were then known. She created a new, bravura pas de deux for Diana and Actaeon, joining the names of the modest Roman goddess and the hapless Greek hunter. She included a few spectacular "stag leaps" for the male dancer, but she largely abandoned the well-known story of Actaeon in creating this divertissement and made instead a rapturous dance for two lovers, set to music by Pugni. Diana is seen as the beautiful goddess of the moon and the hunt, usually wearing a wispy red chiton and carrying a small golden bow; Actaeon is portrayed as a strong, handsome, mortal youth, clad in a short chiton or loincloth. At the premiere, Diana was danced by Galina Ulanova and Actaeon by Vaktang Chabukiani.
