= Plein (disambiguation) =

Plein is a municipality in Rhineland-Palatinate, Germany.

Plein may also refer to:

- Plein, The Hague, a city square in the Netherlands

== People with the surname ==
- Philipp Plein (born 1978), German fashion designer
- Jacques Plein (born 1987), Luxembourgian footballer
