= View of the Dam and Damrak at Amsterdam =

Three paintings by Jacob van Ruisdael

View of the Dam and Damrak at Amsterdam is the name of three similar 17th-century oil on canvas paintings by the Dutch Golden Age painter Jacob van Ruisdael.

- Frick Collection version
- Boymans van Beuningen version
- Mauritshuis version

The paintings are catalogue number 6, 7 and 8 in Seymour Slive's 2001 catalogue raisonné of Ruisdael.

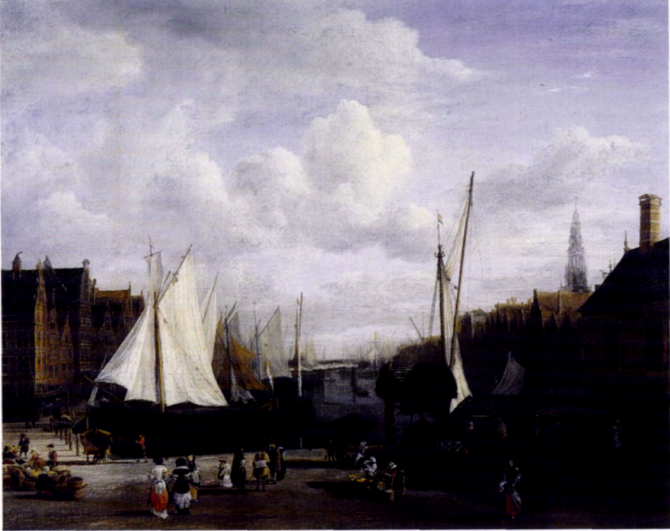
Frick Collection version

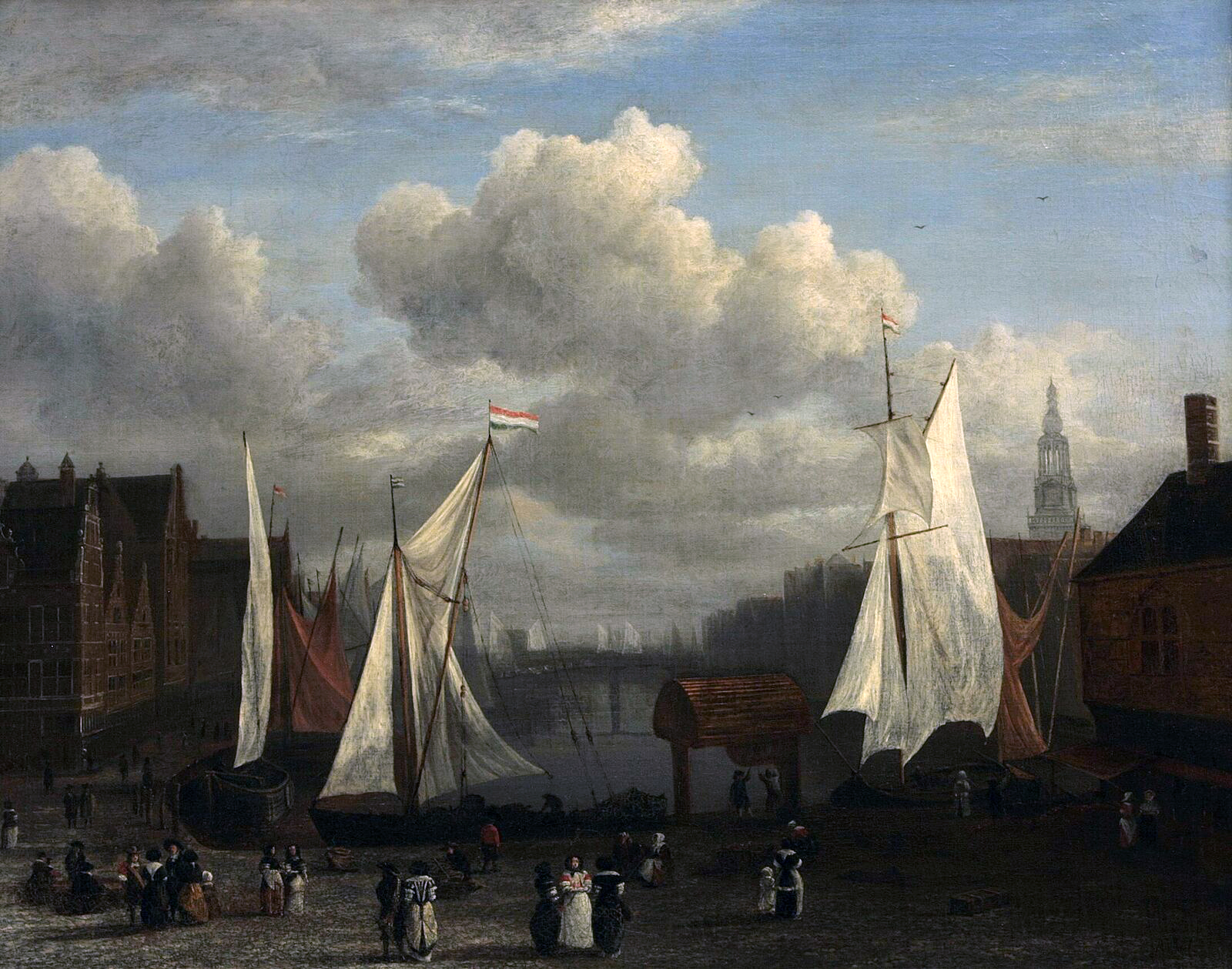
Boymans van Beuningen version

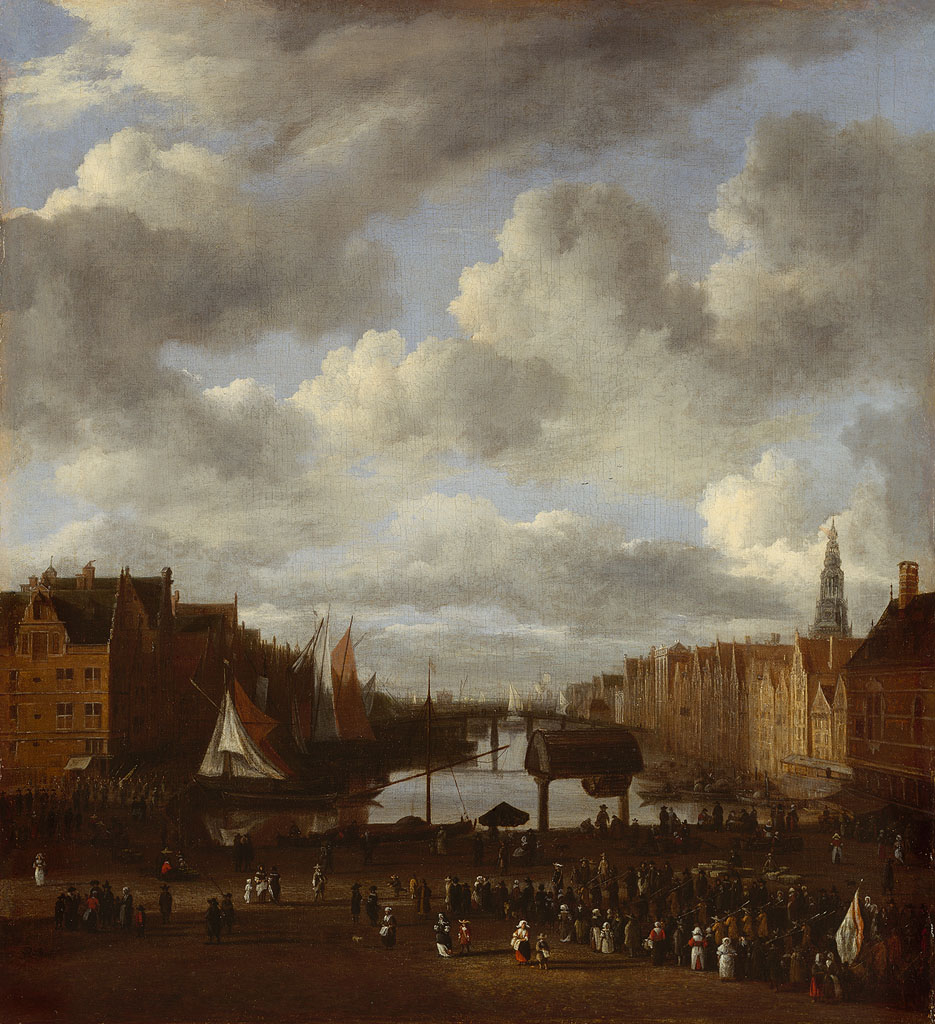
Mauritshuis version

== See also ==
- List of paintings by Jacob van Ruisdael
