= View of the Dam and Damrak at Amsterdam (Frick Collection) =

Painting by Jacob van Ruisdael

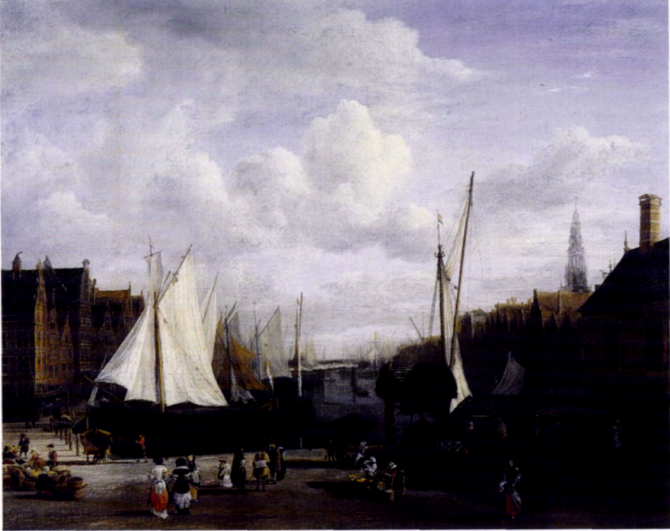
View of the Dam and Damrak at Amsterdam - Jacob van Ruisdael (around 1675) - Frick collection

View of the Dam and Damrak at Amsterdam, also known as Quay at Amsterdam, is a 17th-century oil on canvas painting by the Dutch Golden Age painter Jacob van Ruisdael. It is since 1910 in the Frick Collection in New York. It is currently not on view.

Two other paintings by Ruisdael have the same scene and the same name. One View of the Dam and Damrak at Amsterdam is in the Museum Boymans van Beuningen in Rotterdam; the other View of the Dam and Damrak at Amsterdam is in the collection of the Mauritshuis, but is on long-term loan to the Amsterdams Historisch Museum, since 1999.

The dimensions of the Frick collection painting are 51.7 cm x 65.7 cm. It is signed in the lower right corner. Slive states that the undated painting is from about 1675. At that time Ruisdael lived on the Dam Square, the main square of Amsterdam, but he could not have painted this from the window of his studio, as it was facing the other way.

The painting is not in good condition, especially the bottom half, although not as bad as the Boymans van Beuningen version.

The painting is catalogue number 7 in Seymour Slive's 2001 catalogue raisonné of Ruisdael. (the other two versions are number 6 and 8). The painting may either be catalogue number 12 or 13f in the 1911 catalogue raisonné by art historian Hofstede de Groot. It is accession number 1910.1.110 in the Frick collection, where it is called Quay at Amsterdam.

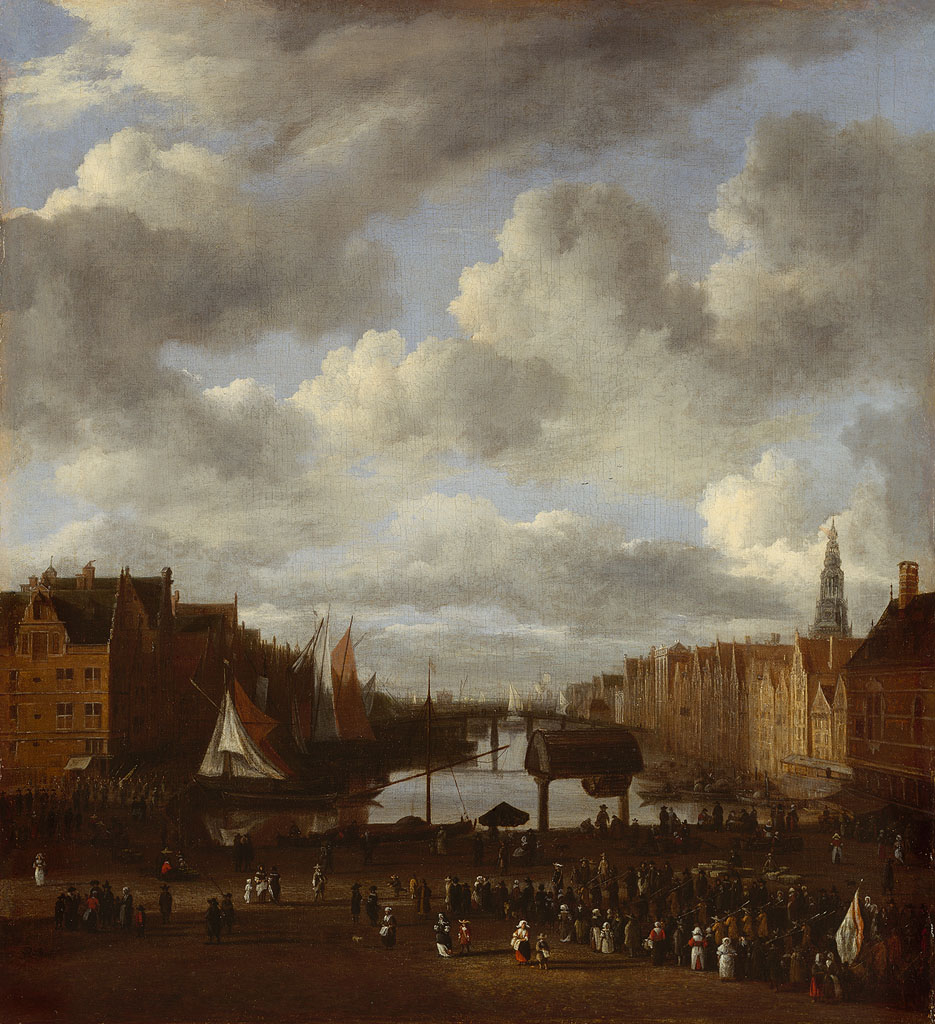
Mauritshuis version

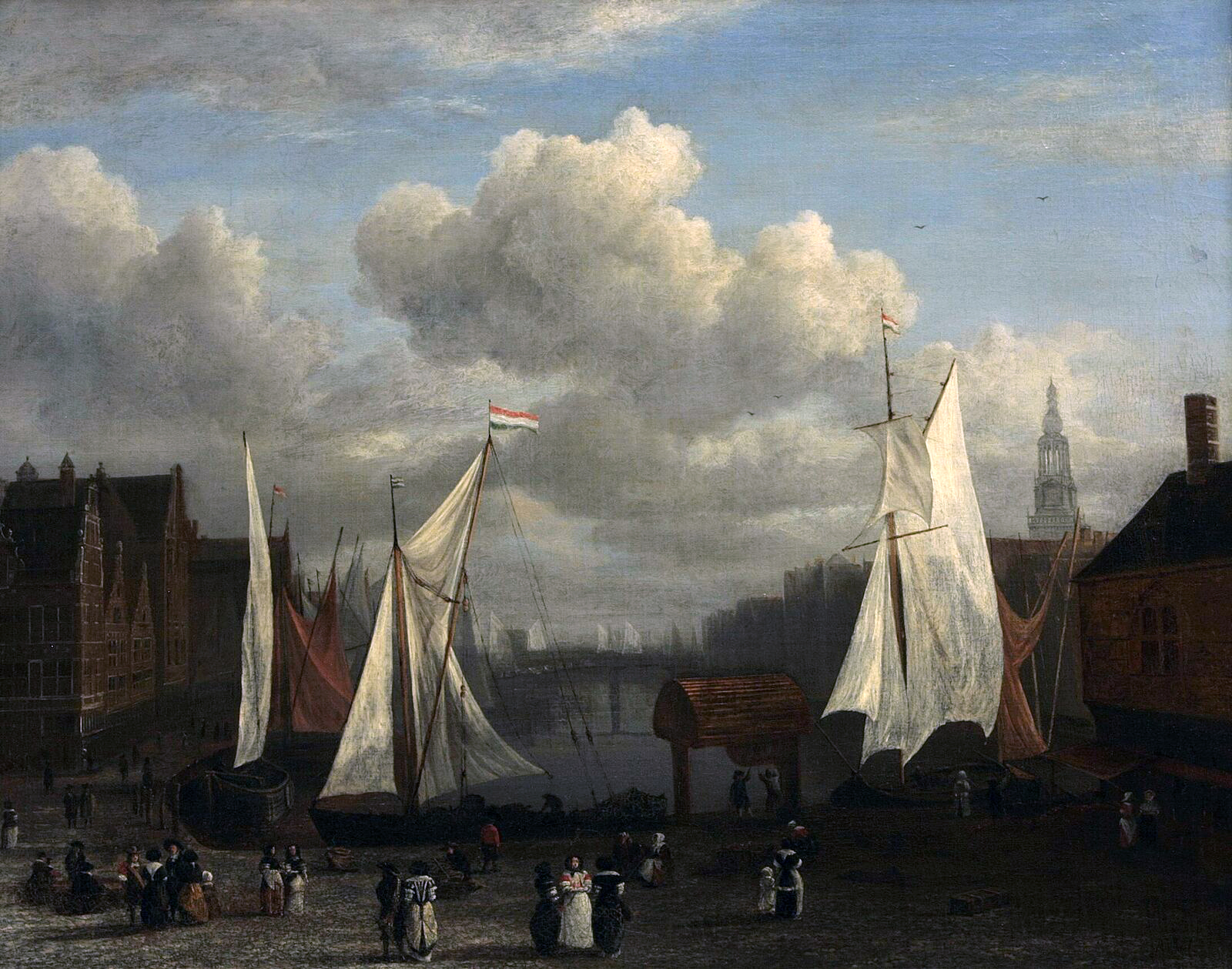
Boymans van Beuningen version

== See also ==
- List of paintings by Jacob van Ruisdael
