= View of the Dam and Damrak at Amsterdam (Boymans van Beuningen) =

Painting by Jacob van Ruisdael

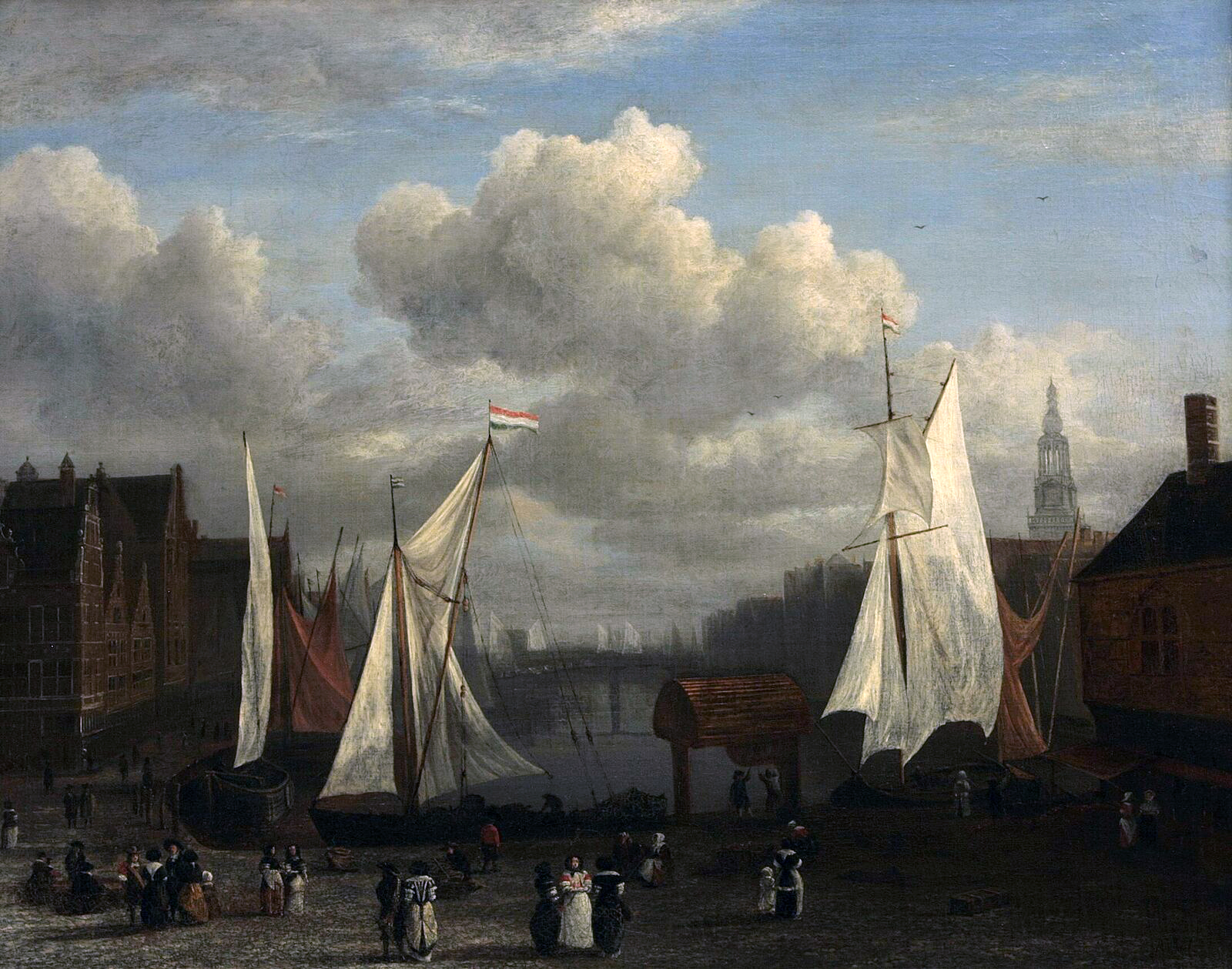
View of the Dam and Damrak at Amsterdam - Jacob van Ruisdael (around 1675) - Museum Boymans van Beuningen

View of the Dam and Damrak at Amsterdam, also known as The Damrak in Amsterdam, is a 17th-century oil on canvas painting by the Dutch Golden Age painter Jacob van Ruisdael. Since 1866 it is in the collection of the Museum Boymans van Beuningen in Rotterdam.

There are two other paintings by Ruisdael of the same scene and same name. One View of the Dam and Damrak at Amsterdam is in the Frick Collection in New York; the other View of the Dam and Damrak at Amsterdam is in the collection of the Mauritshuis, but is on long-term loan to the Amsterdams Historisch Museum, since 1999. City-scapes are relatively rare in Ruisdael's work.

The foreground of the painting, depicting the north side of the Dam, shows groups of people. Merchandise is on display. Behind the Dam is the Damrak, bordered on both sides by rows of houses, and with cargo ships moored at its quay. To the right behind the building is the tower of the Oude Kerk [Old Church]. In the middle of the Damrak is the Papenbrug; sails are hanging to dry over the railings. In the middle of the quay, two men are working with the pier wheel and axle. The house to the left of the Dam is called ‘the Bishop’ and to the right is the inn ‘Under the Sail’.

Some doubt exists as to whether the figures on the painting are from Ruisdael's hand or if they were added by a figure painter. Such a collaboration between two specialists frequently occurred and this could also be the case here.

The dimensions of the Museum Boymans van Beuningen painting are 53.3 cm x 67.2 cm. It is signed in the lower right. Slive states that the undated painting is from about 1675. At that time Ruisdael lived on the Dam Square, the main square of Amsterdam, but he could not have painted this from the window of his studio, as it was facing the other way.

The painting is not in good condition, especially on the right the paint has become thin. This does however provide insight into Ruisdael's method, as it reveals the buildings behind the sails were fully painted first, before the sails were painted over.

The painting is catalogue number 8 in Seymour Slive's 2001 catalogue raisonné of Ruisdael. (the other two versions are number 6 and 7). It is inventory number 1744 in the collection of the Museum Boymans van Beuningen, which lists the painting as The Damrak in Amsterdam. The painting may either be catalogue number 13 or 13f in the 1911 catalogue raisonné by art historian Hofstede de Groot.

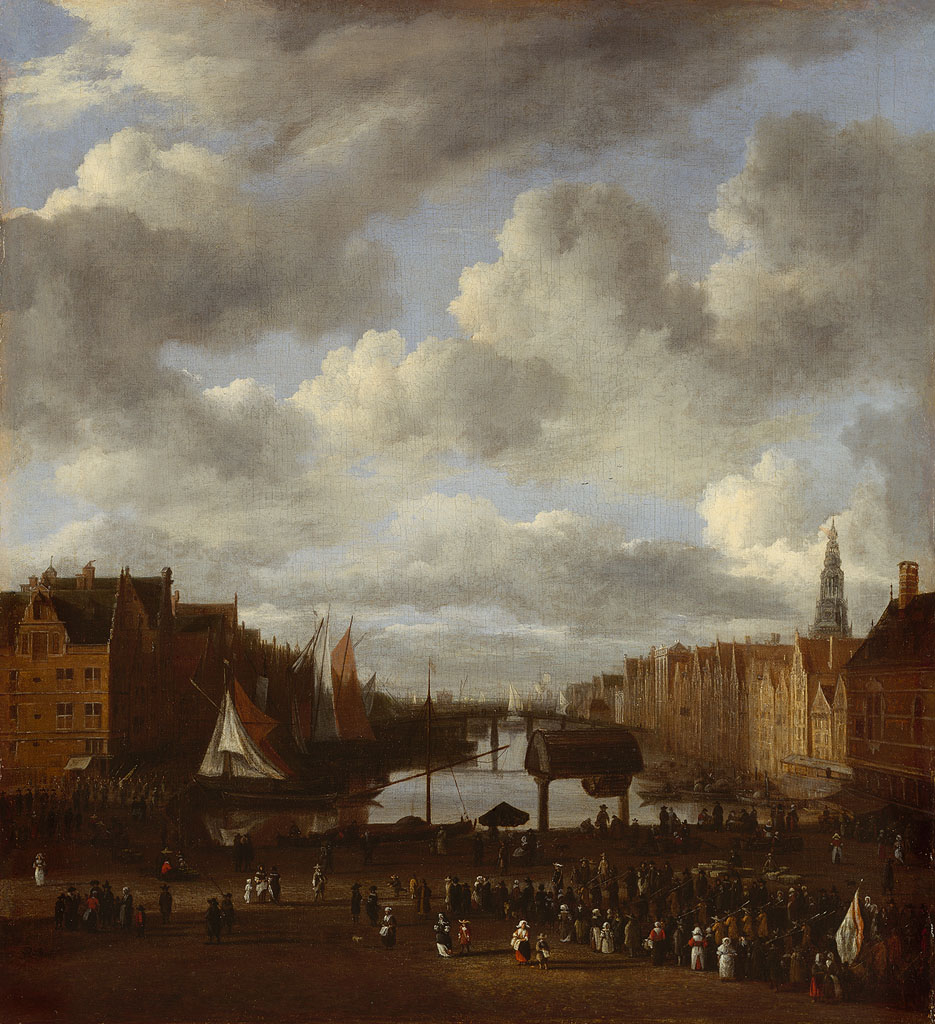
Mauritshuis version

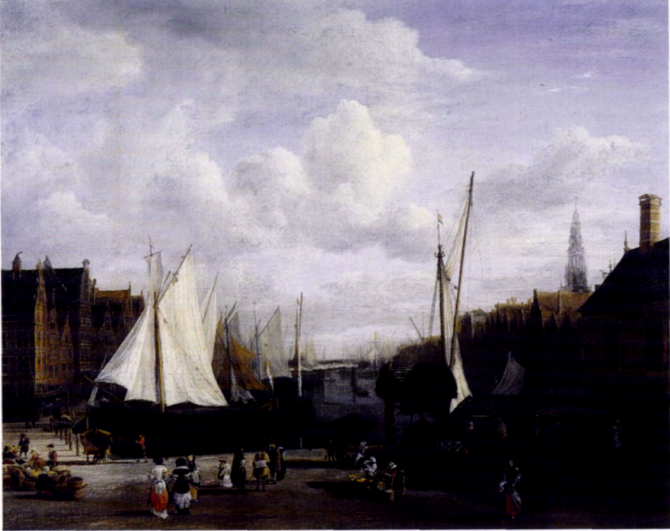
Frick Collection version

== See also ==
- List of paintings by Jacob van Ruisdael
