= View of the Dam and Damrak at Amsterdam (Mauritshuis) =

Painting by Jacob van Ruisdael

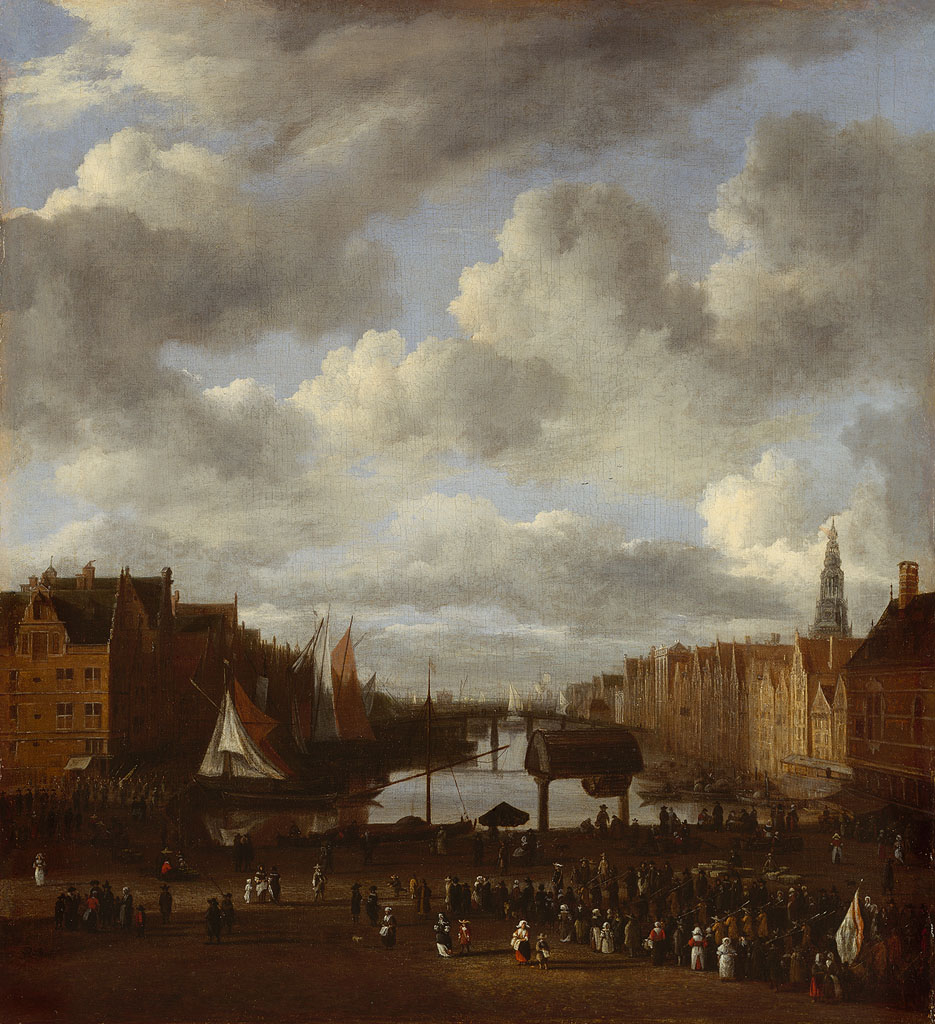
View of the Dam and Damrak at Amsterdam - Jacob van Ruisdael (late 1670s) - Mauritshuis version

View of the Dam and Damrak at Amsterdam is a 17th-century oil on canvas painting by the Dutch Golden Age painter Jacob van Ruisdael. It is in the collection of the Mauritshuis in the Hague. It gives a bird's eye view of the crowd watching the parade of the civic guard on the Dam Square, the main square of Amsterdam.

Its dimensions are 46.8 cm x 43 cm. It is signed in the lower left. Based on the absence of dairy farmers in the market, the flag of the House of Orange, and the style of painting Slive states that the undated painting was made in the late 1670s.

The painting is catalogue number 6 in Seymour Slive's 2001 catalogue raisonné of Ruisdael. It is inventory number 803 in the collection of the Mauritshuis. The painting may either be catalogue number 13f or 18 in the 1911 catalogue raisonné by art historian Hofstede de Groot.

There are two other paintings of the same scene and same name. One is in the Frick Collection in New York; the other View of the Dam and Damrak at Amsterdam is in the collection of Museum Boymans van Beuningen in Rotterdam.

The painting is on long-term loan to the Amsterdams Historisch Museum, since 1999.

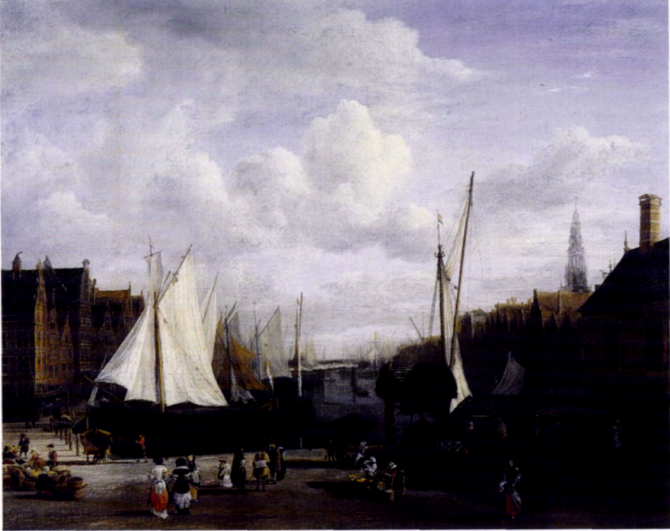
Frick Collection version

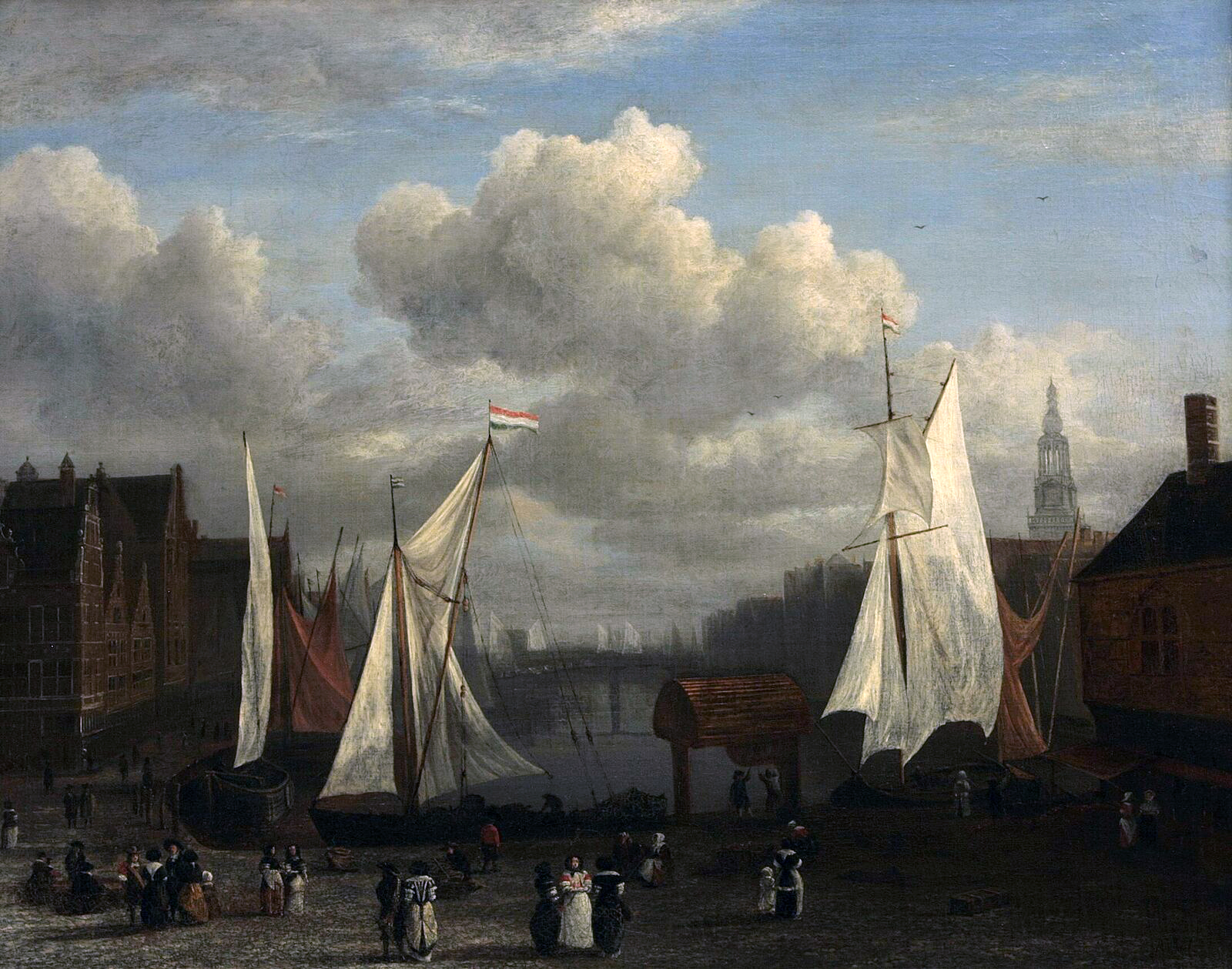
Boymans van Beuningen version

== See also ==
- List of paintings by Jacob van Ruisdael
