= Plein, The Hague =

Town Square in the Netherlands

Plein
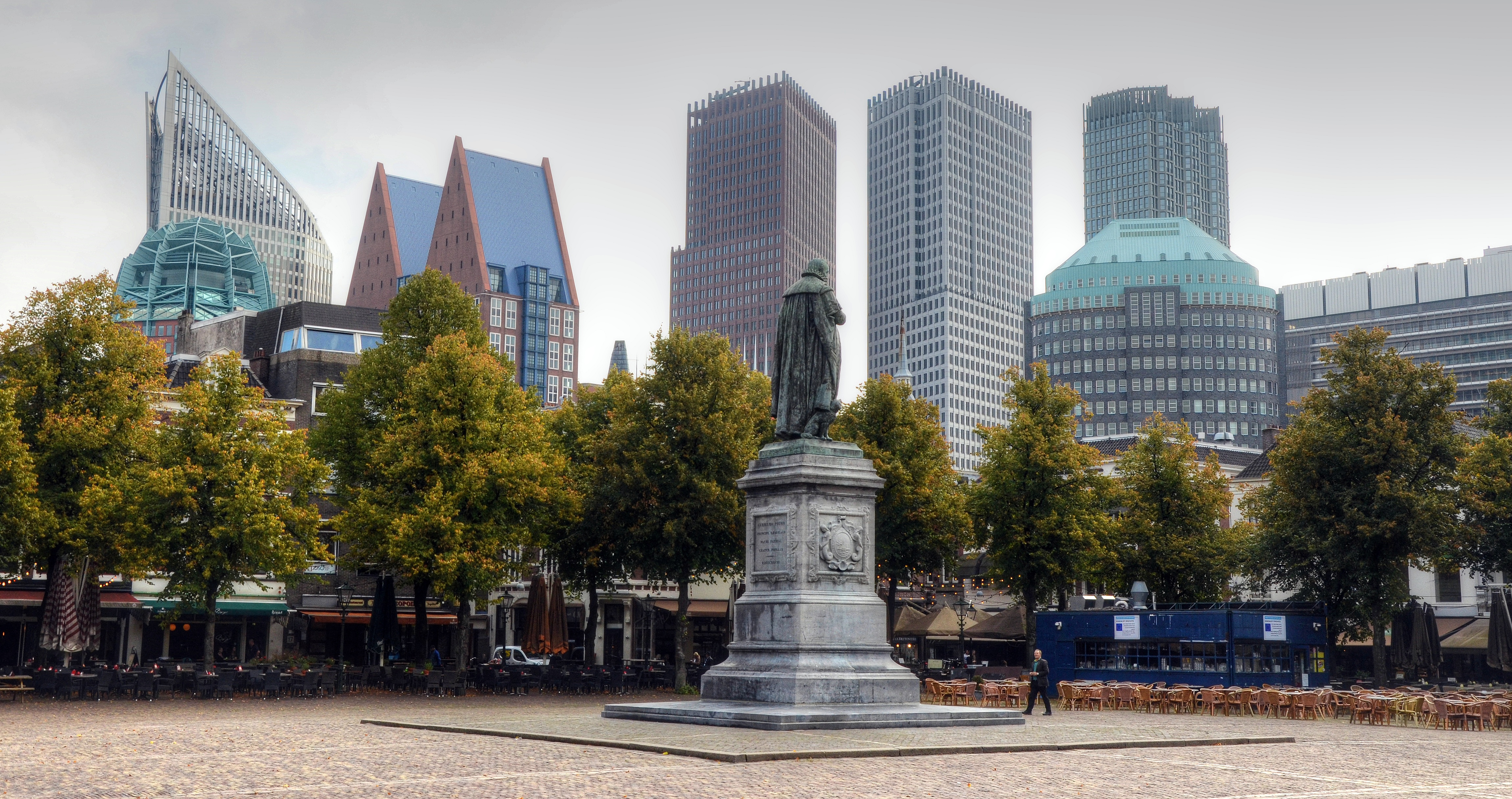
- Plein in the city centre of The Hague, with the statue of William the Silent in the middle

- Location within South Holland
- Type: Town square
- Location: The Hague, Netherlands
- Coordinates: 52.0800533°N 4.3157279°E

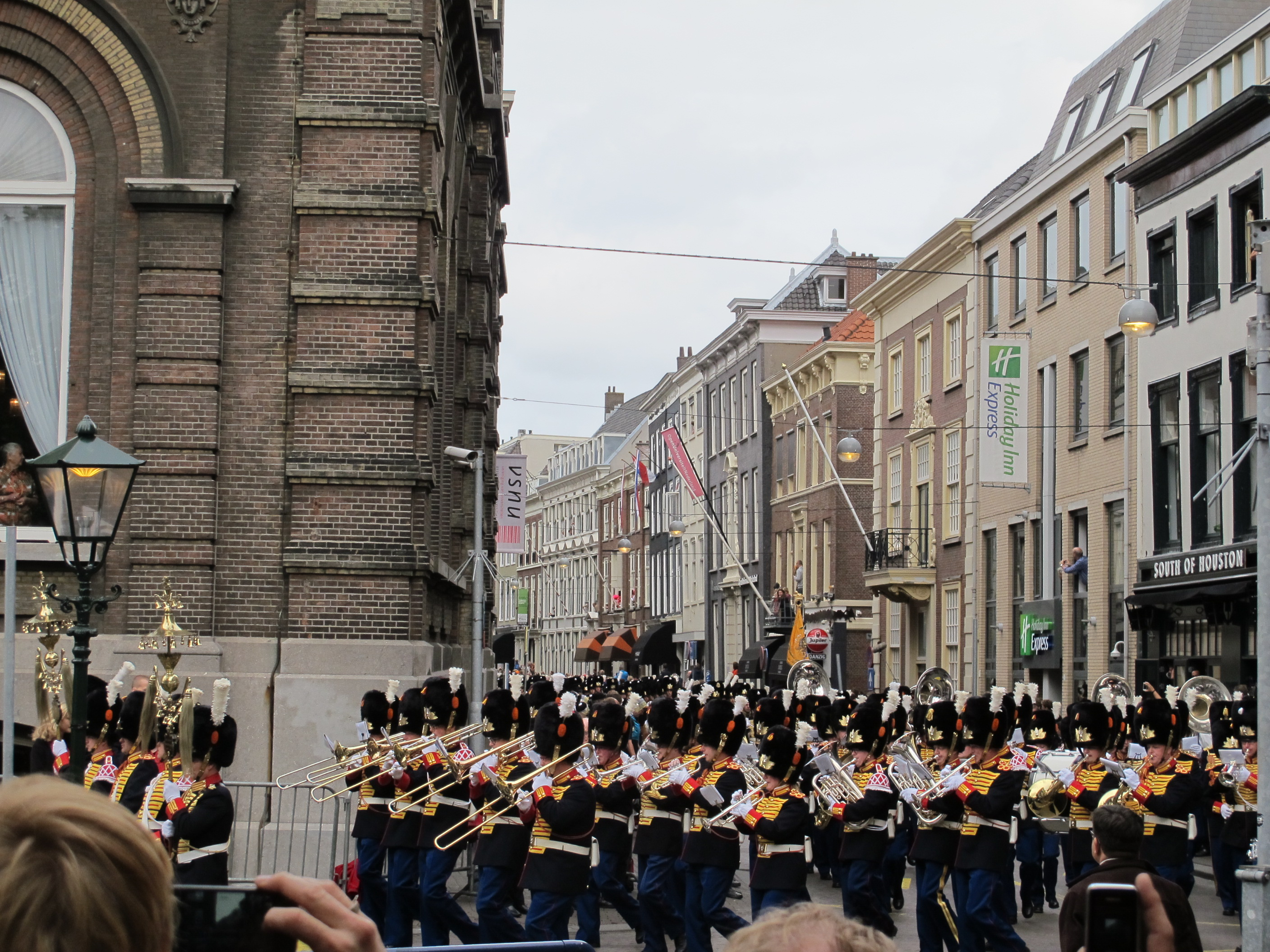
The Central Royal Military Band of the Netherlands Army on Plein

Plein or het Plein (Dutch pronunciation: [ət ˈplɛin]; lit. '(the) Square') is a town square in the old city centre of The Hague in the Netherlands.

It is located adjacent to the Binnenhof, the meeting place of the States General of the Netherlands; the entrance to the House of Representatives can be found on Plein 2. The Mauritshuis art museum is located on Plein 29.

Plein was originally a garden, forming a part of the Binnenhof castle, residence of the Counts of Holland. It was used to grow vegetables for the court. The garden was surrounded by a ring of canals and intersected by ditches. As a town square, Plein was constructed in 1632 and was inspired by the Place des Vosges in Paris.

A statue of William the Silent, made by Dutch sculptor Lodewyk Royer, was installed in the centre of the square in 1848.
