= Jacques Plein =

Luxembourgish footballer

Personal information
- Date of birth: 17 February 1987 (age 39)
- Place of birth: Luxembourg
- Position: Centre back

Senior career*
Years	Team	Apps	(Gls)
2004–2011	FC Etzella Ettelbruck	66	(2)
2011–2014	FC Progrès Niederkorn	22	(0)
2014–2016	FC 72 Erpeldange	24	(3)
2016–2018	FC Mamer 32	50	(0)

International career^{‡}
2009–2011	Luxembourg	2	(0)
- * Club domestic league appearances and goals as of 27 June 2023 ‡ National team caps and goals as of 27 June 2023

Jacques Plein (born 17 February 1987) is a former Luxembourgish footballer, who last played for FC Mamer 32 in Luxembourg's domestic second tier.

== Club career ==
A defender, he has played for Etzella from 2004 through 2011.
