= Mauritshuis =

Art museum in The Hague, Netherlands

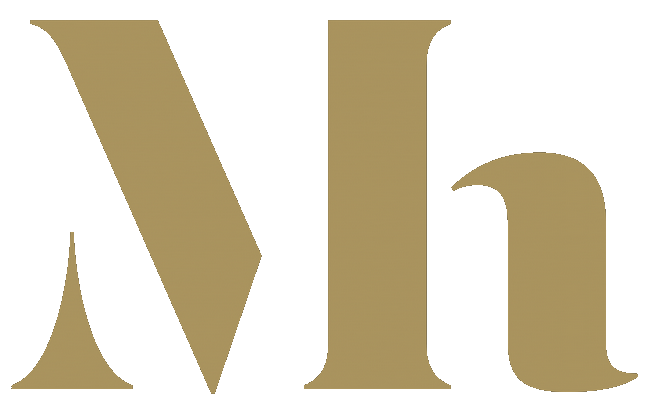

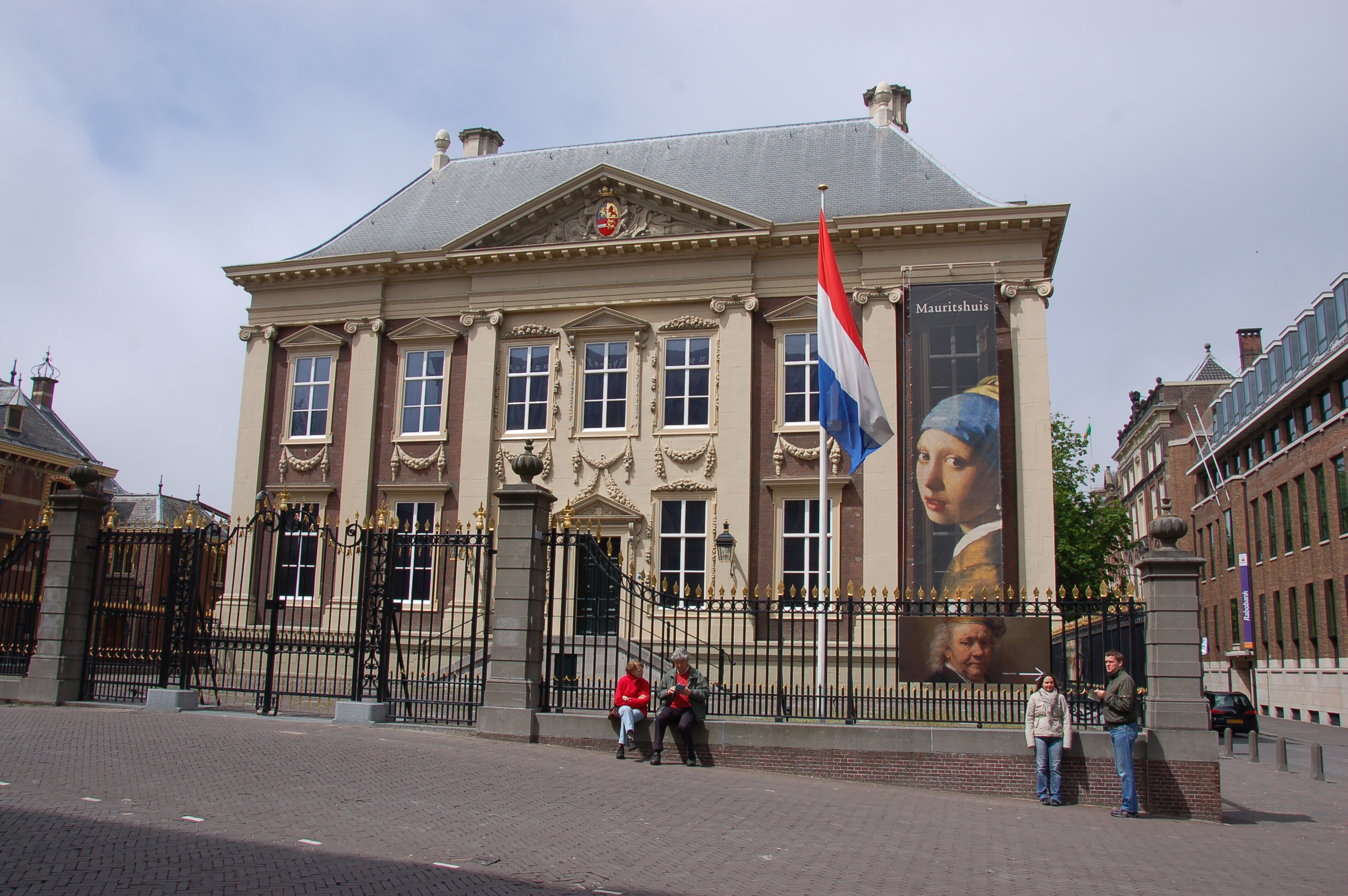
- Mauritshuis in 2005

- Location in South Holland in the Netherlands
- Established: 1822
- Location: Plein 29; The Hague, Netherlands
- Coordinates: 52°04′49″N 4°18′51″E
- Type: Art museum
- Collection size: 854 objects
- Visitors: 416,334 (2018)
- Director: Martine Gosselink
- President: Ila Kasem
- Owner: Dutch state
- Website: www.mauritshuis.nl/en/

The Mauritshuis (Dutch pronunciation: [ˈmʌurɪtsˌɦœys]; The Hague dialect: [ˈmɑːʁɪtsˌɦœːs]; lit. 'Maurice House') is an art museum in The Hague, Netherlands. The museum houses the Royal Cabinet of Paintings which consists of 854 objects, mostly Dutch Golden Age paintings. The collection contains works by Johannes Vermeer, Rembrandt van Rijn, Jan Steen, Paulus Potter, Frans Hals, Jacob van Ruisdael, Hans Holbein the Younger, and others. Originally, the 17th-century building was the residence of Count (later Prince) John Maurice of Nassau. The building is now the property of the government of the Netherlands and is listed in the top 100 Dutch heritage sites.

== History ==
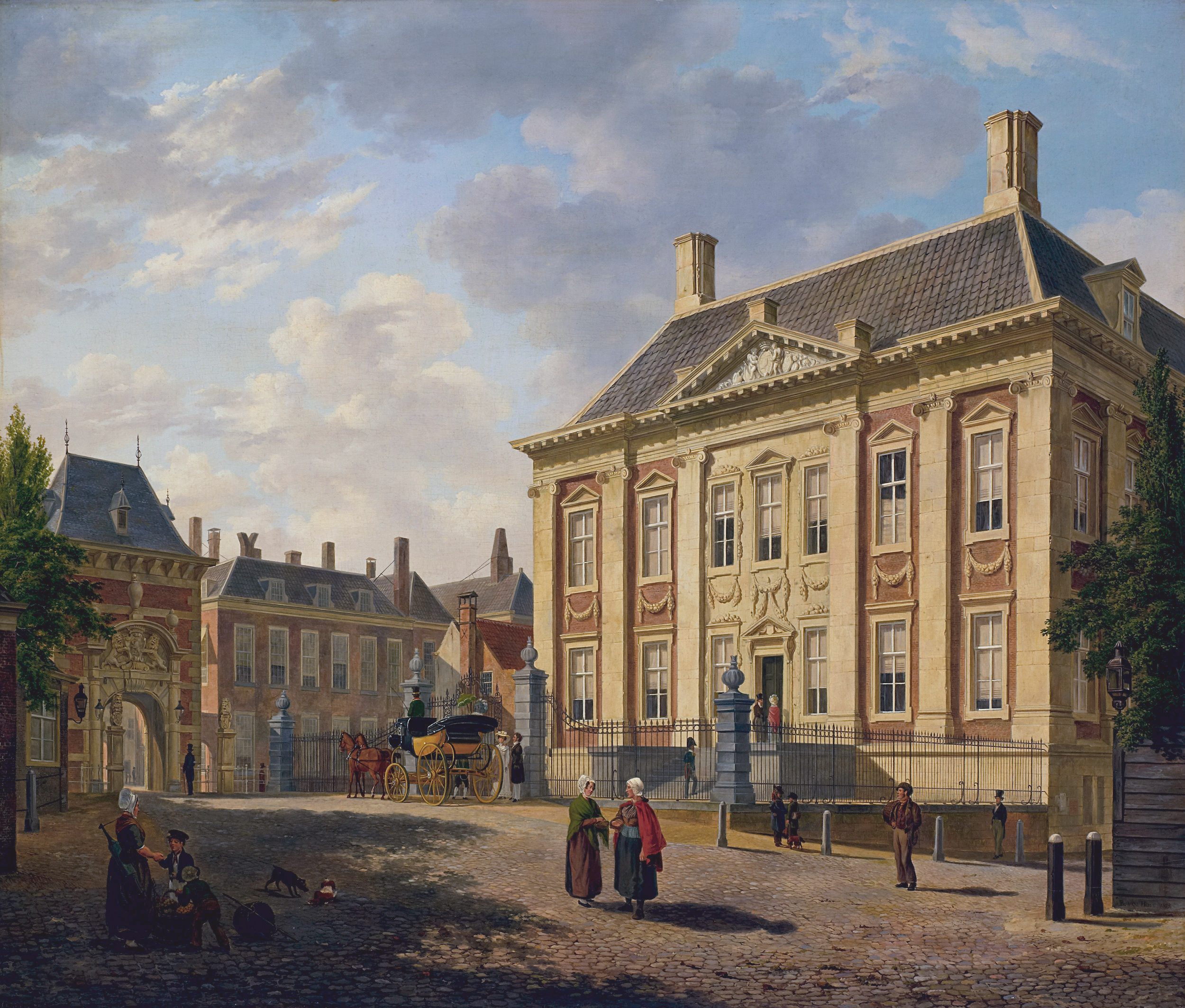
The Mauritshuis in 1825

In 1631, John Maurice, Prince of Nassau-Siegen, a cousin of Stadtholder Frederick Henry, bought a plot bordering the Binnenhof and the adjacent Hofvijver pond in The Hague, at that time the political centre of the Dutch Republic. Between 1636 and 1641, the Mauritshuis was built on this piece of land during John Maurice's governorship of Dutch Brazil. It was built in the Dutch Classicist style by the Dutch architects Jacob van Campen and Pieter Post. The two-storey building is strictly symmetrical; originally the interior contained four apartments and a great hall. Each apartment was designed with an antechamber, a chamber, a cabinet, and a cloakroom. The building had a cupola, which was destroyed in a fire in 1704.

After the death of Prince John Maurice in 1679, the house was owned by the Maes family, who leased the house to the Dutch government. In 1704, most of the interior of the Mauritshuis was destroyed by fire. The building was restored between 1708 and 1718.

In 1774, an art gallery open to the public was formed in what is now the Prince William V Gallery. That collection was seized by the French in 1795 and only partially recovered in 1808. The small gallery space soon proved to be too small, however, and in 1820, the Mauritshuis was bought by the Dutch state for the purpose of housing the Royal Cabinet of Paintings. In 1822, the Mauritshuis was opened to the public and housed the Royal Cabinet of Paintings and the Royal Cabinet of Rarities. In 1875, the entire museum became available for paintings.

During the Nazi occupation of the Netherlands from 1940 to 1945, the Mauritshuis, despite being a prominent landmark and even occupied by the Nazis, was somehow able to serve as a hideout for people in the area who were evading Nazi slave labour, with people hiding in the building's attic and basement despite being close to Nazi offices in the building. The Mauritshuis also avoided having its art collection fall victim to Nazi plunder, with the art collection, including Girl with a Pearl Earring, being able to be stored in a bombproof bunker located just below the museum for two years before finding refugee in the St Pietersberg caves near Maastricht until the liberation of the Netherlands in May 1945.

In 1995, the Mauritshuis was established as a non-profit foundation. The foundation set up at the time took charge of both the building and the collection, which it was given on long-term loan. This building, which is the property of the state, continues to be rented by the museum. In 2007, the museum announced its desire to expand. Within three years the definitive design was presented. The museum would occupy a part of the nearby Sociëteit de Witte building. The two buildings would be connected via a tunnel, running underneath the Korte Vijverberg.

The renovation started in 2012 and finished in 2014. The design was by Hans van Heeswijk. During the renovation, about 100 of the museum's paintings were displayed in The Hague's Kunstmuseum in the Highlights Mauritshuis exhibition. About 50 other paintings, including Girl with a Pearl Earring, went on loan to exhibitions in the United States and Japan. The expanded museum was reopened on 27 June 2014 by King Willem-Alexander.

== Controversy over the colonial past of Prince Maurice ==
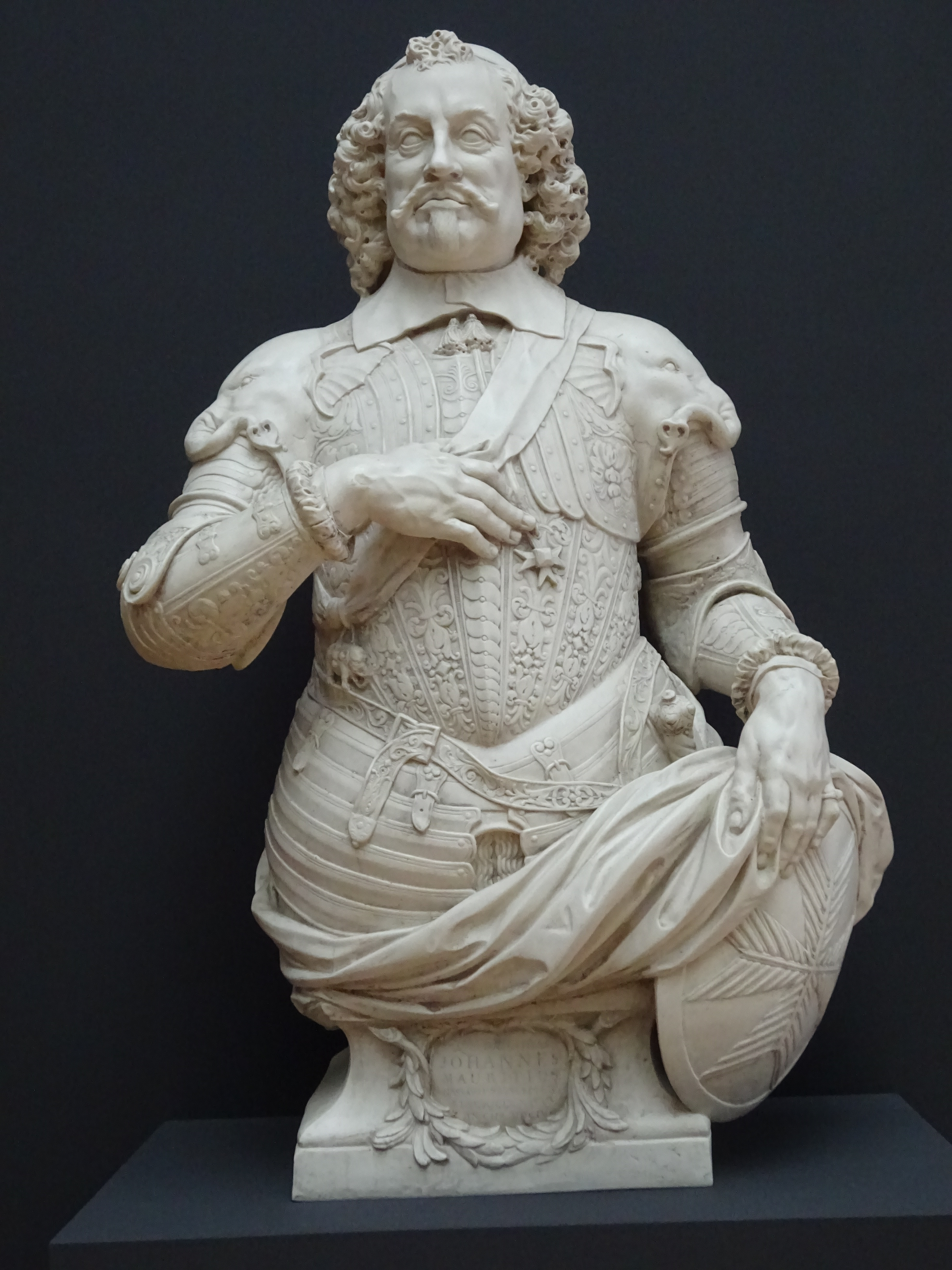
Bust of John Maurice by Bartholomeus Eggers

In 1664, Prince John Maurice ordered a marble bust portrait of himself for the garden of the Mauritshuis, the Prince's residence in The Hague. The statue was sculpted by the Flemish sculptor Bartholomeus Eggers. Prince Maurice had the bust moved to the burial chamber (German: Fürstengruft) in Siegen which he had built for himself in 1670.

In 1986, a copy of the statue made in plastic was placed inside the Mauritshuis. The bust was removed from the Mauritshuis in 2017 amidst controversy over the Netherland's colonial history and Prince John Maurice's role in the slave trade. The Mauritshuis museum has denied that the removal had anything to do with the controversy and has stated that the decision was taken on the grounds that the object was solely a copy made of plastic and the museum was unable to offer the necessary historical context for it in the foyer of the Mauritshuis where it was exhibited. The museum has since created a webpage dedicated to explaining the role of the Prince in the creation of the museum's building and collection and the museum's current view of the Prince. The statements on the page highlight the key role the Prince played in the slave trade in Dutch Brazil and how this enabled the accrual of his wealth (in certain cases even in breach of then-existing rules) .

== Collection ==
The collection of paintings of stadtholder William V, Prince of Orange was presented to the Dutch state by his son, King William I. This collection formed the basis of the Royal Cabinet of Paintings of around 200 paintings. The collection is currently called the Royal Picture Gallery. The current collection consists of almost 800 paintings and focuses on Dutch and Flemish artists, such as Pieter Brueghel, Paulus Potter, Peter Paul Rubens, Rembrandt van Rijn, Jacob van Ruisdael, Johannes Vermeer, and Rogier van der Weyden. There are also works of Hans Holbein in the collection in the Mauritshuis.

=== Selected exhibits ===
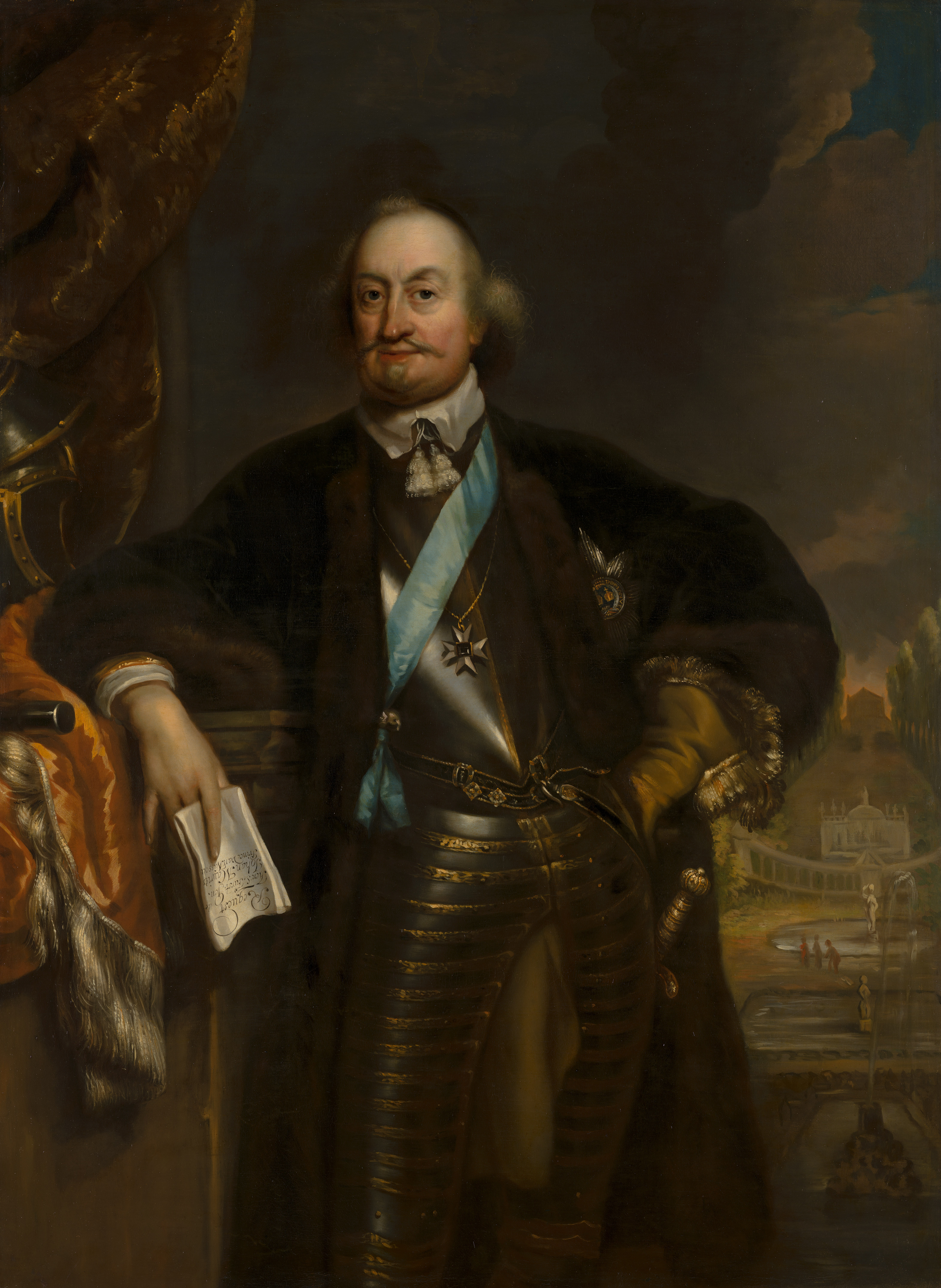
Jan de Baen
Prince John Maurice (c. 1669)

Johannes Vermeer
Girl with a Pearl Earring (c. 1665)

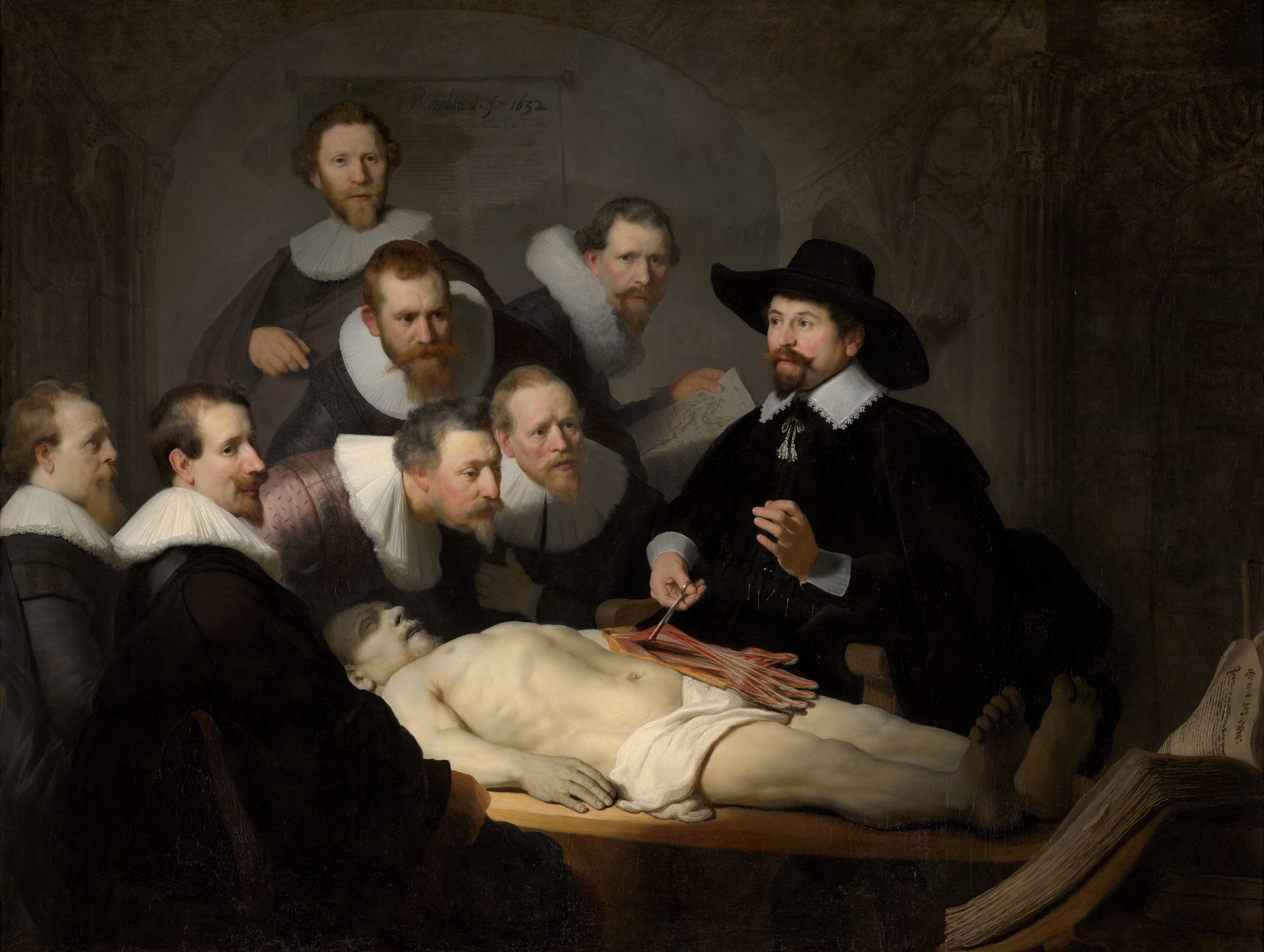
Rembrandt van Rijn
The Anatomy Lesson of Dr. Nicolaes Tulp (c. 1632)

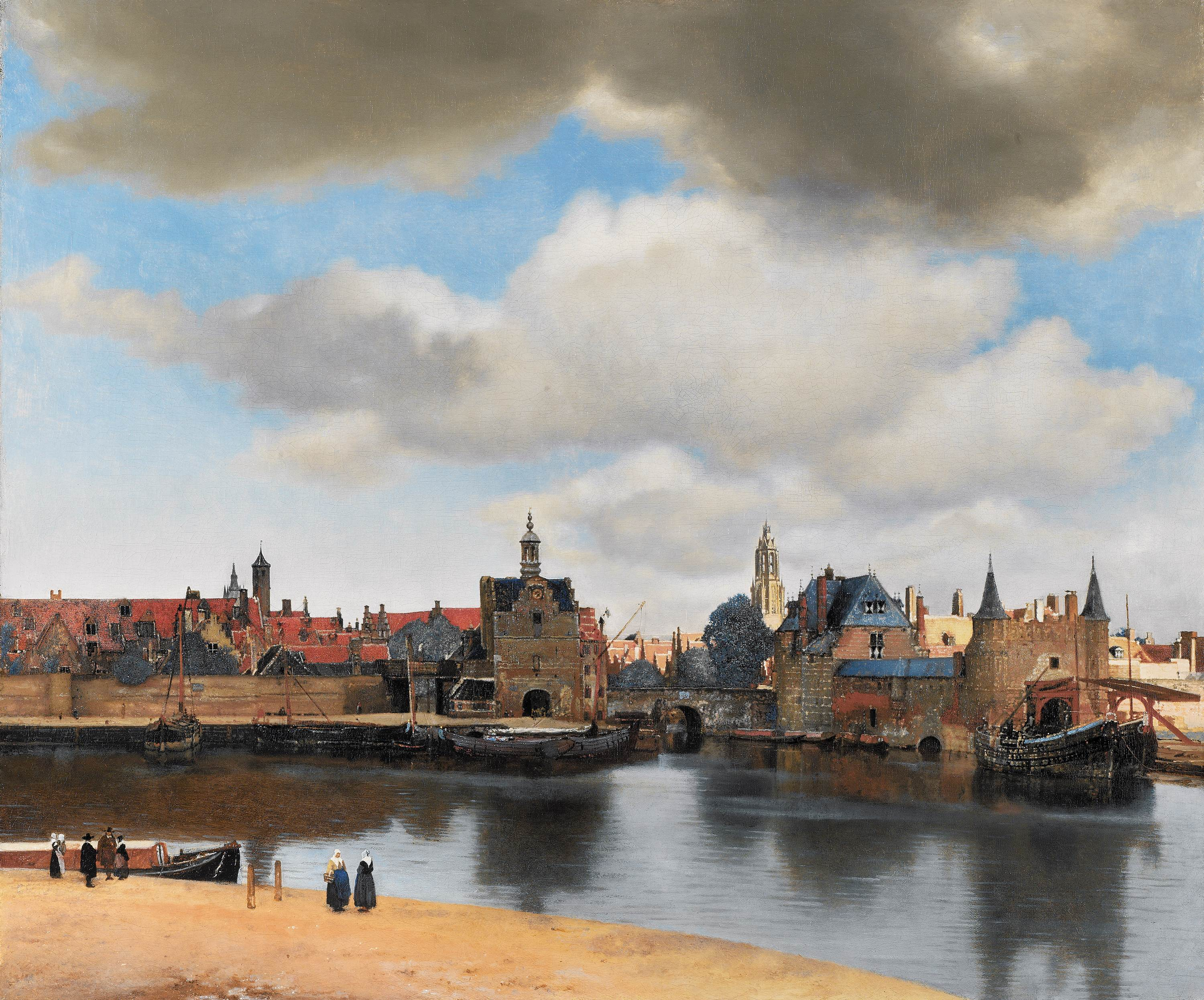
Johannes Vermeer
View of Delft (c. 1660)

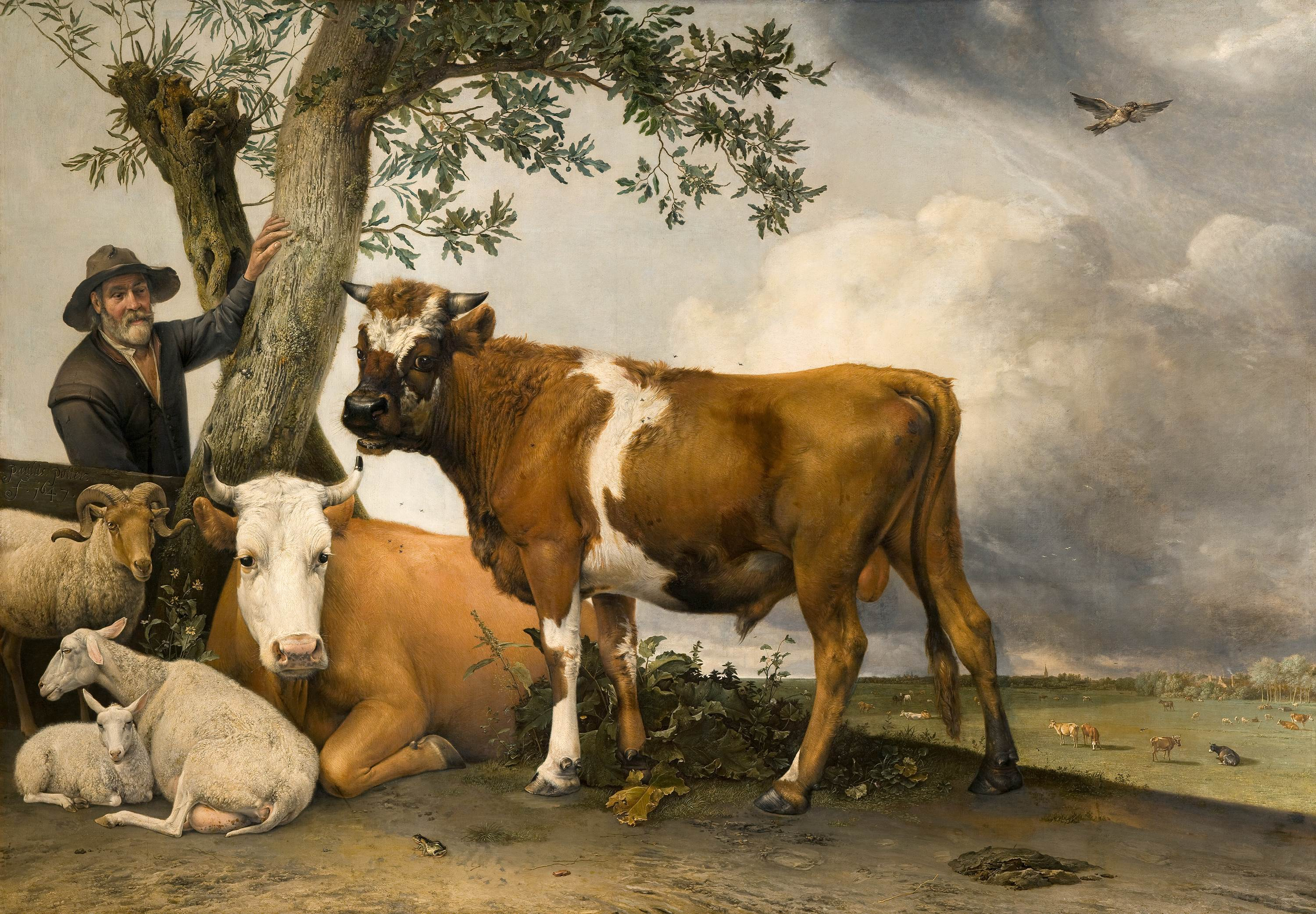
Paulus Potter
The Young Bull (1647)

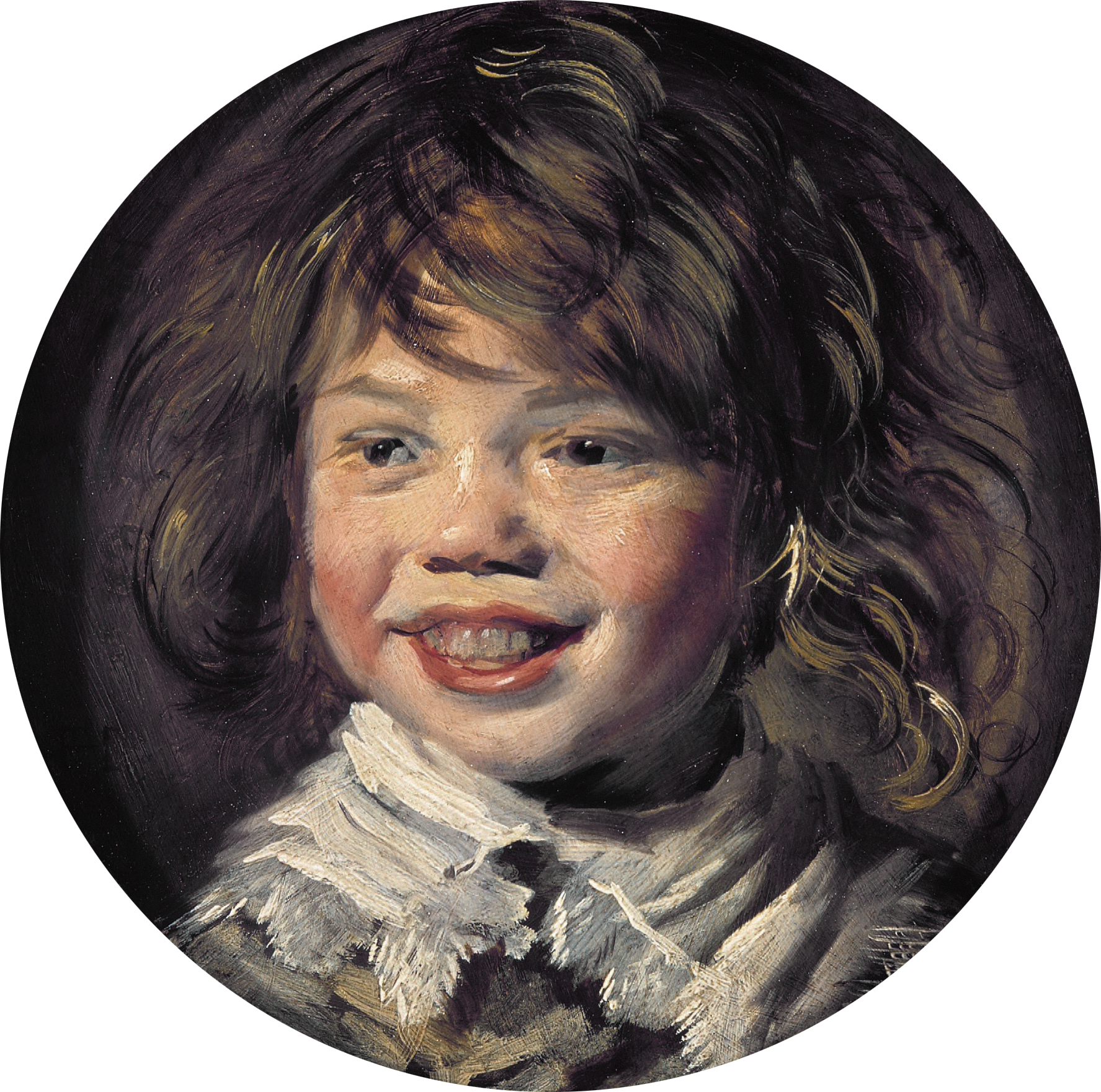
Frans Hals
Laughing Boy (c. 1625)

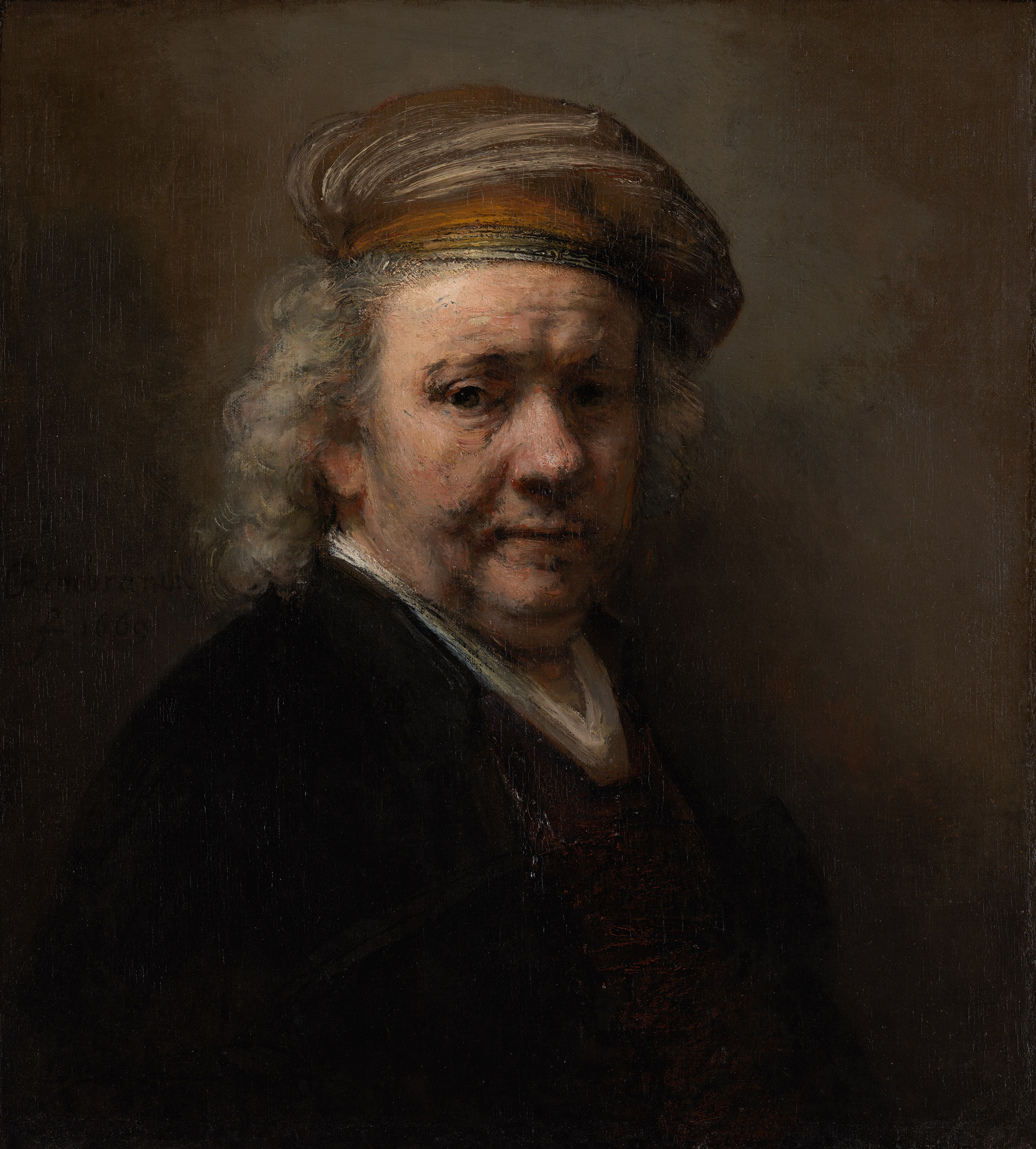
Rembrandt van Rijn
Self-portrait (1669)

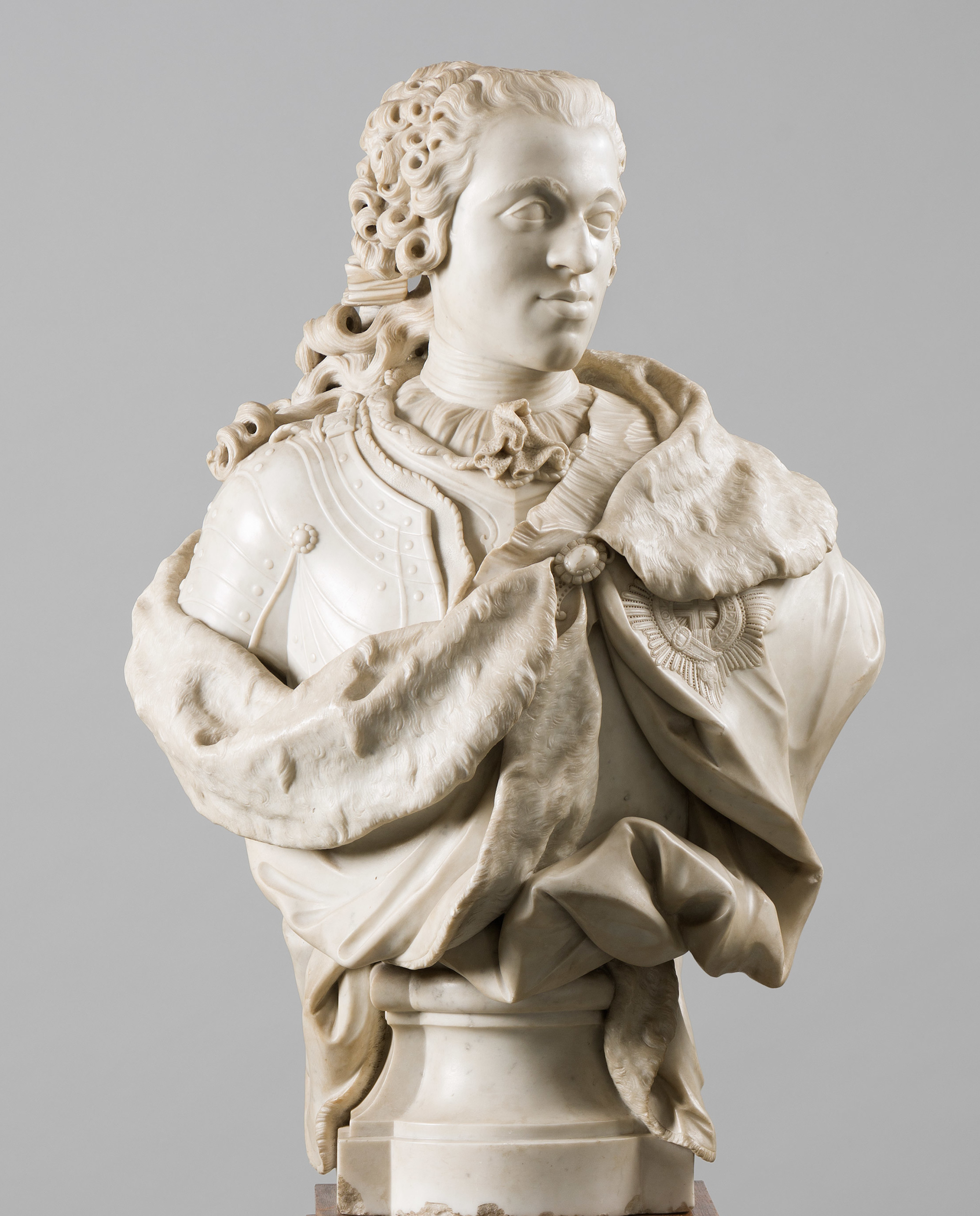
Jan Baptist Xavery
Bust of William IV, Prince of Orange (1733)

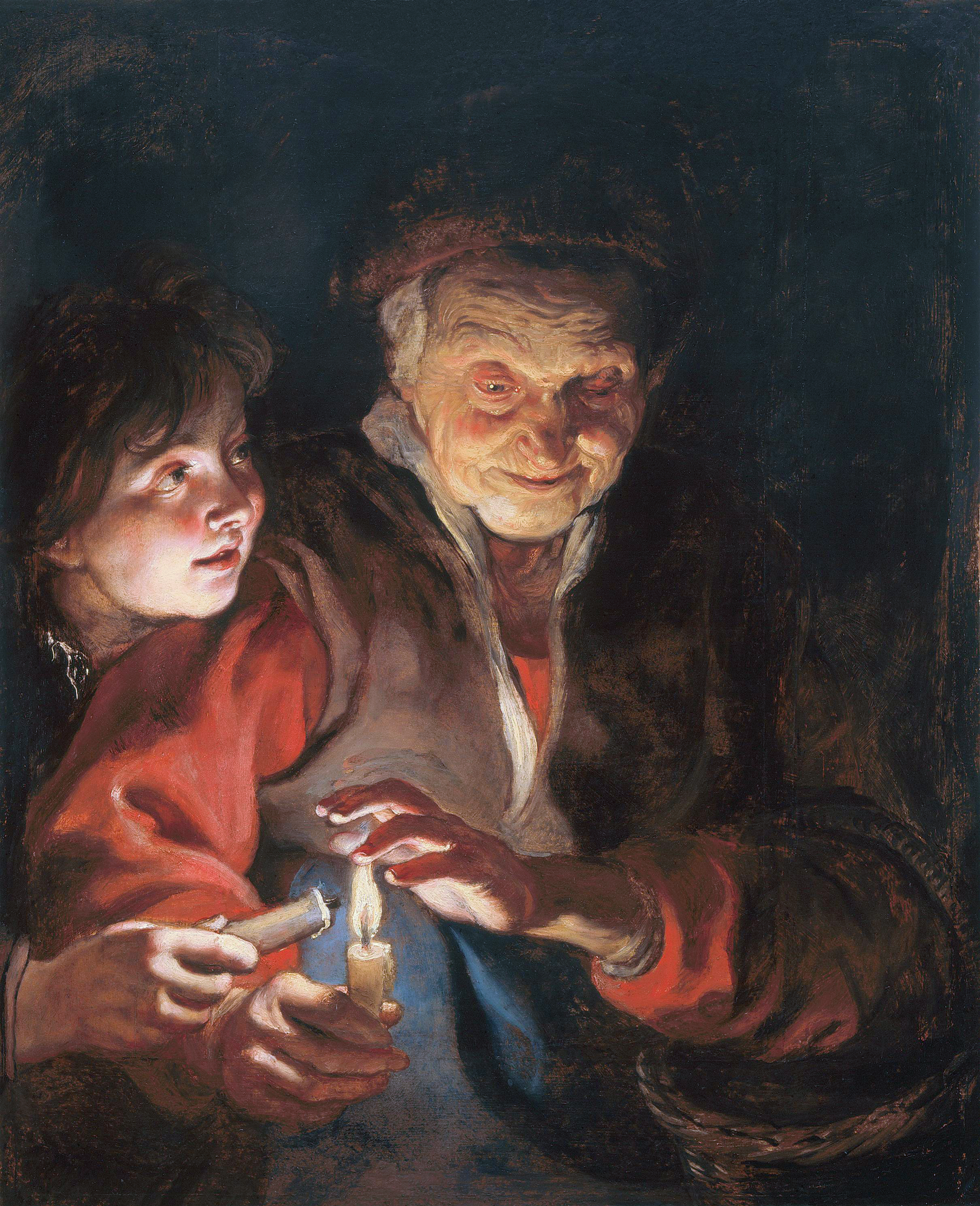
Peter Paul Rubens
Night Scene (c. 1616/17)

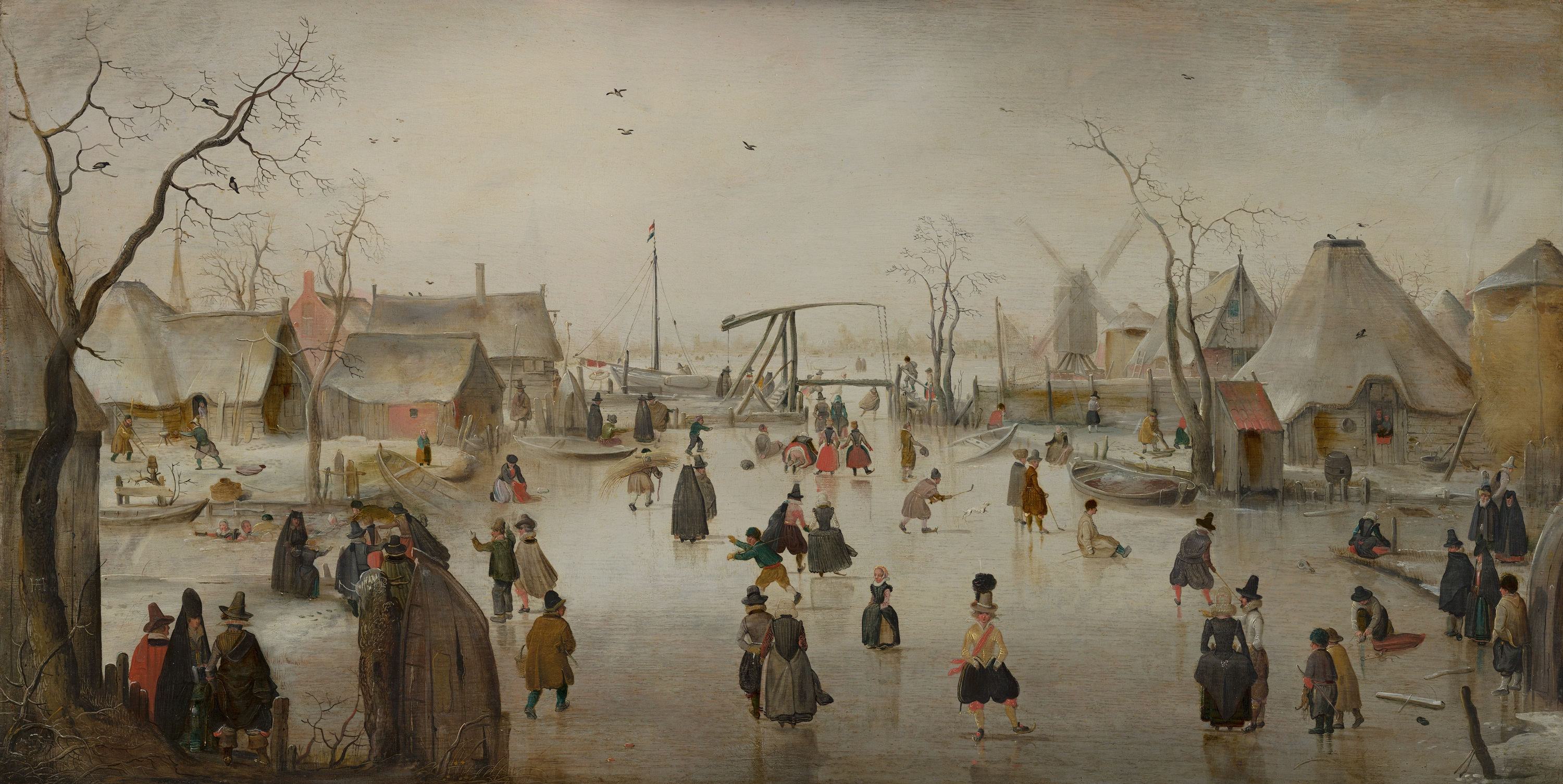
Hendrick Avercamp
On the Ice (c. 1610)

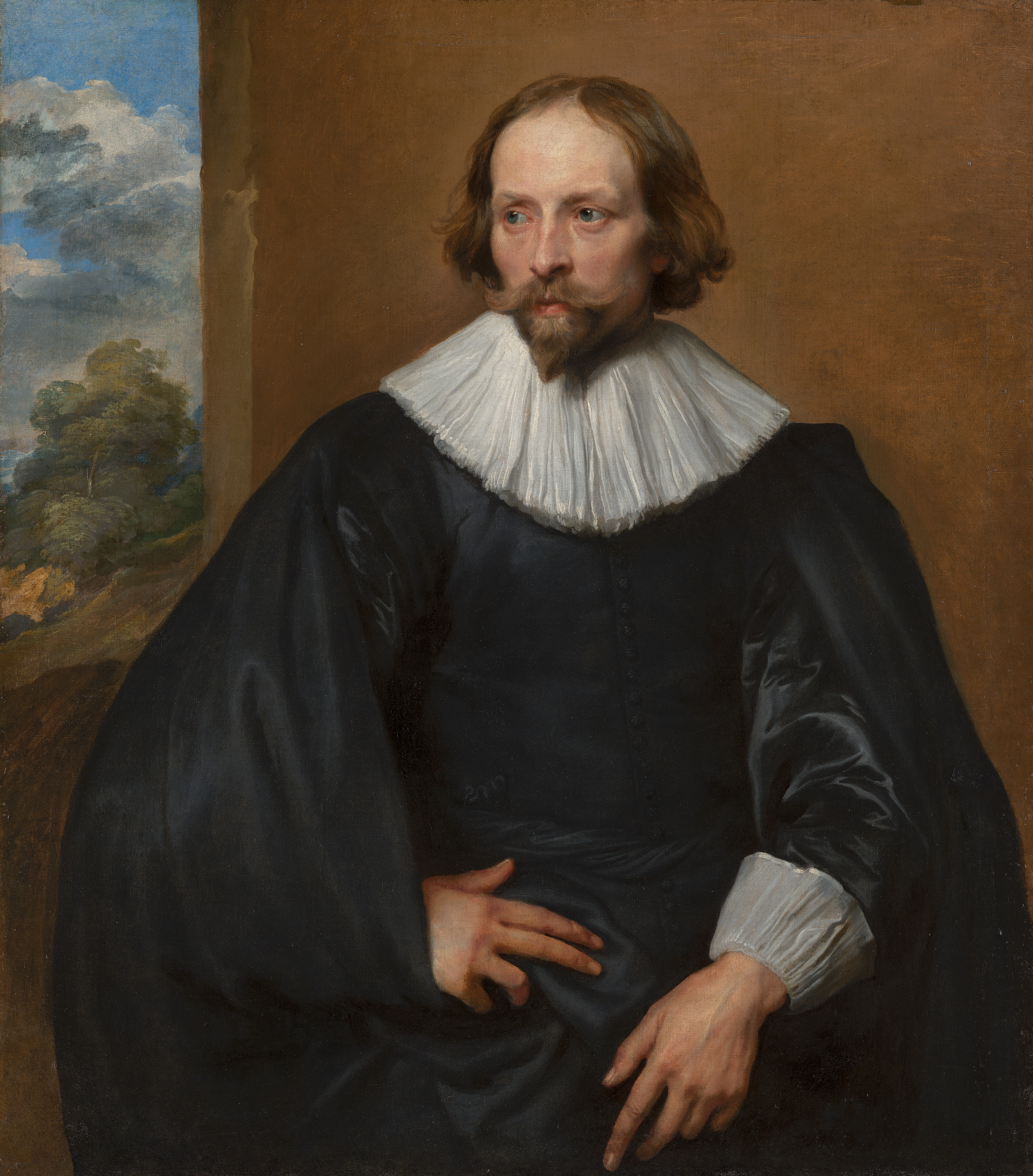
Anthony van Dyck
Portrait of Quintijn Symons (c. 1634)

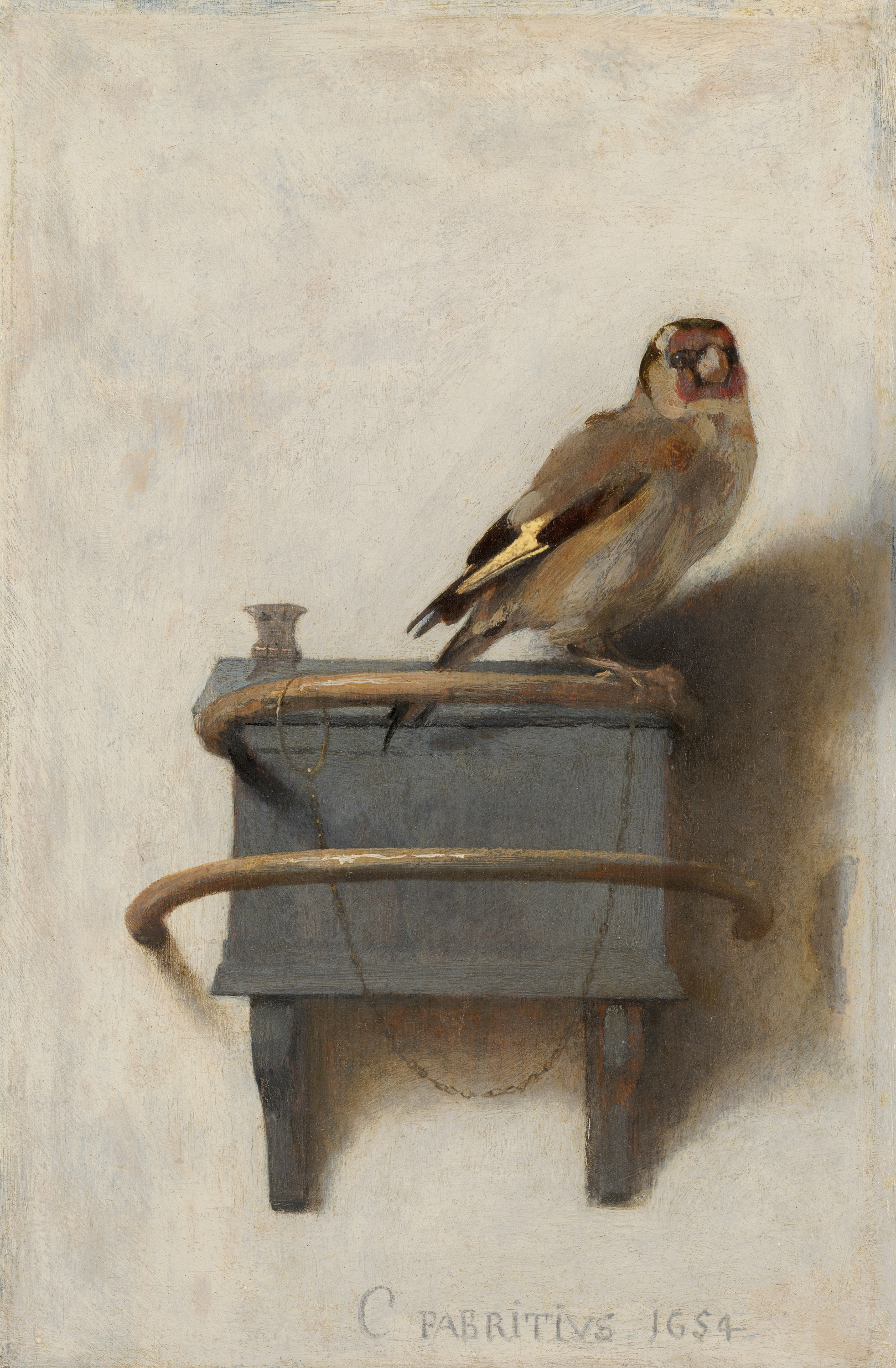
Carel Fabritius
The Goldfinch (1654)

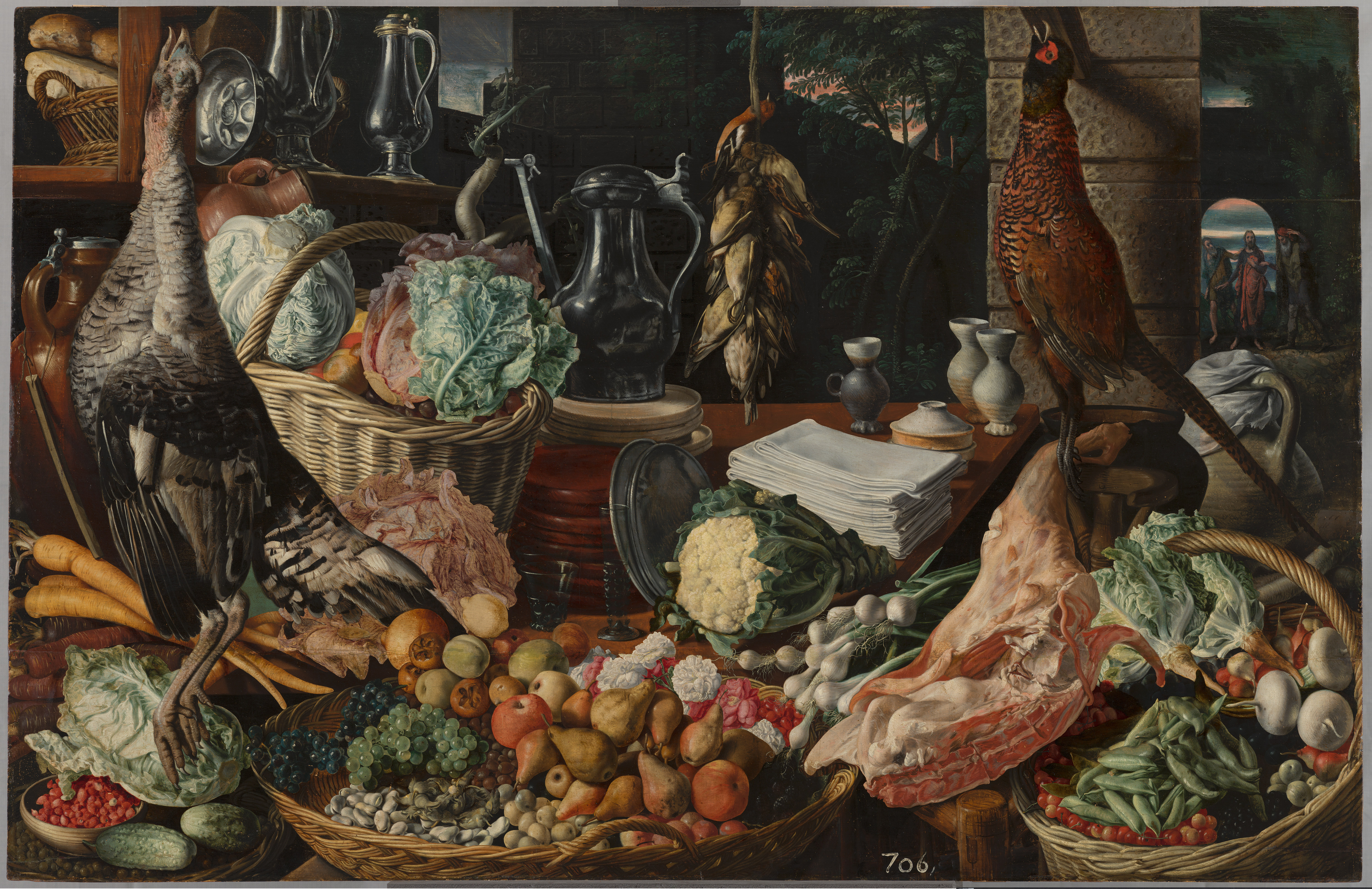
Joachim Beuckelaer
Kitchen Scene with Christ and the Disciples at Emmaus (c. 1563)

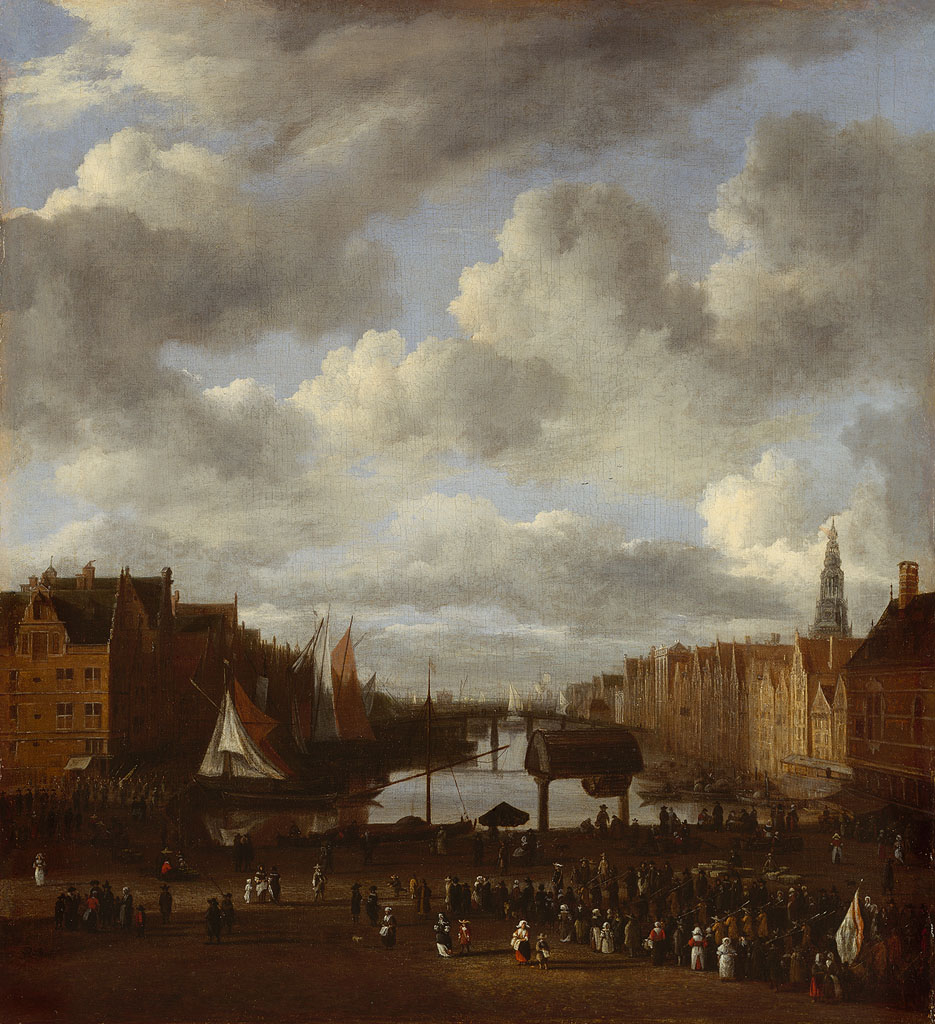
Jacob van Ruisdael
View of the Dam and Damrak at Amsterdam (1670s)

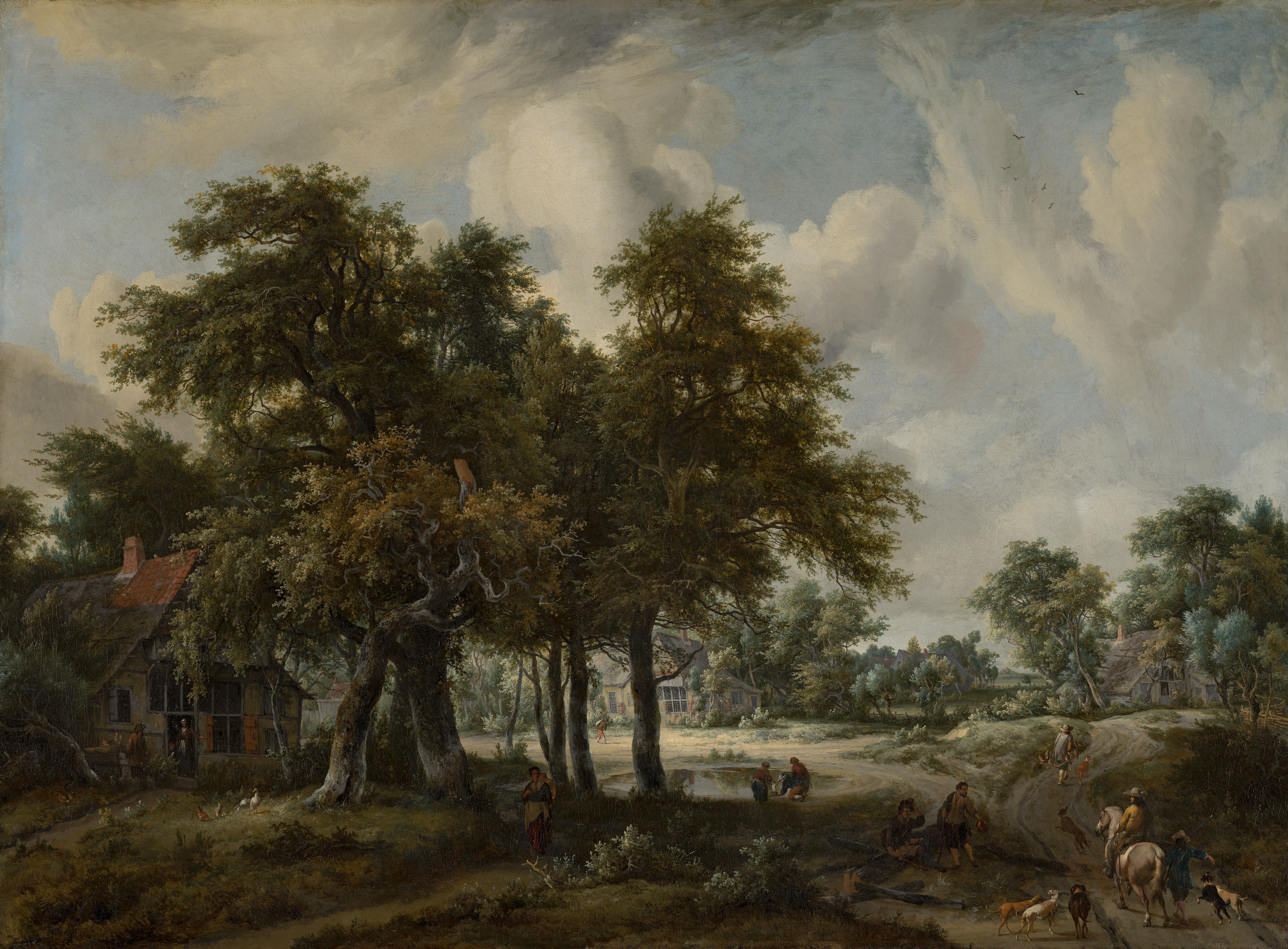
Meindert Hobbema
Wooded Landscape with Farmsteads (c. 1665)

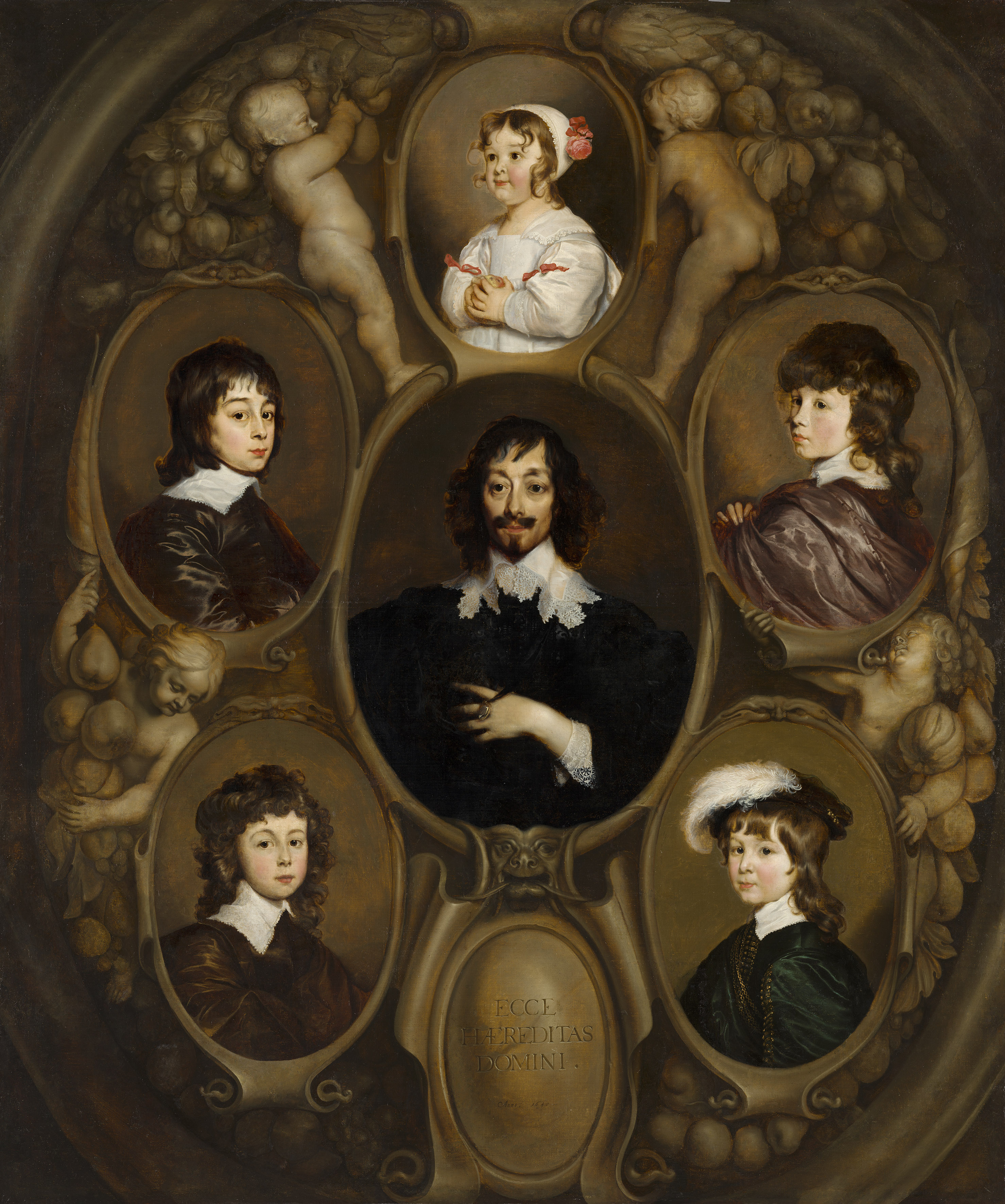
Adriaen Hanneman Portrait of Constantijn Huygens (1596-1687) and his Five Children (1640)

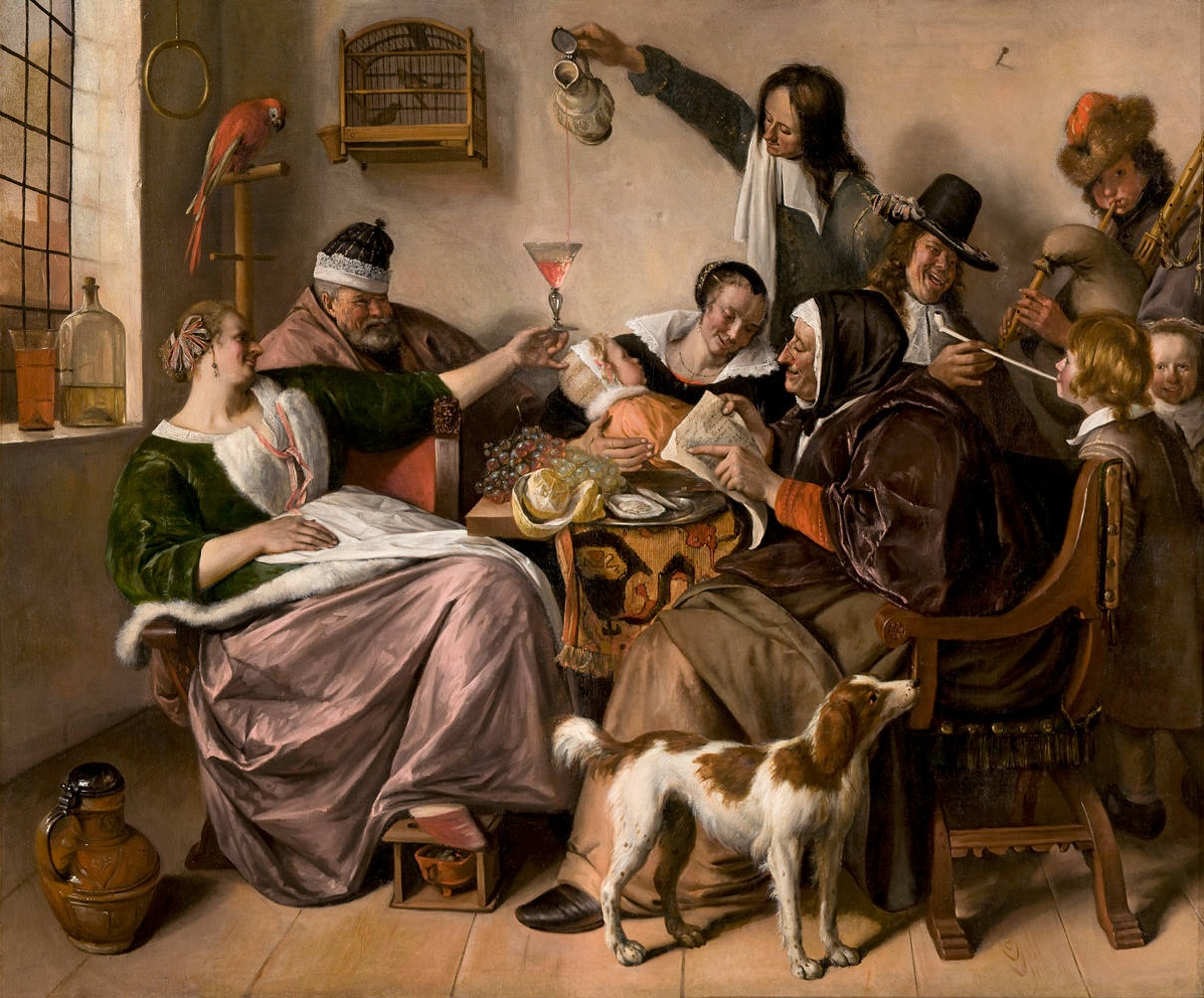
Jan Steen As the Old Sing, So Pipe the Young (c. 1668–1670)

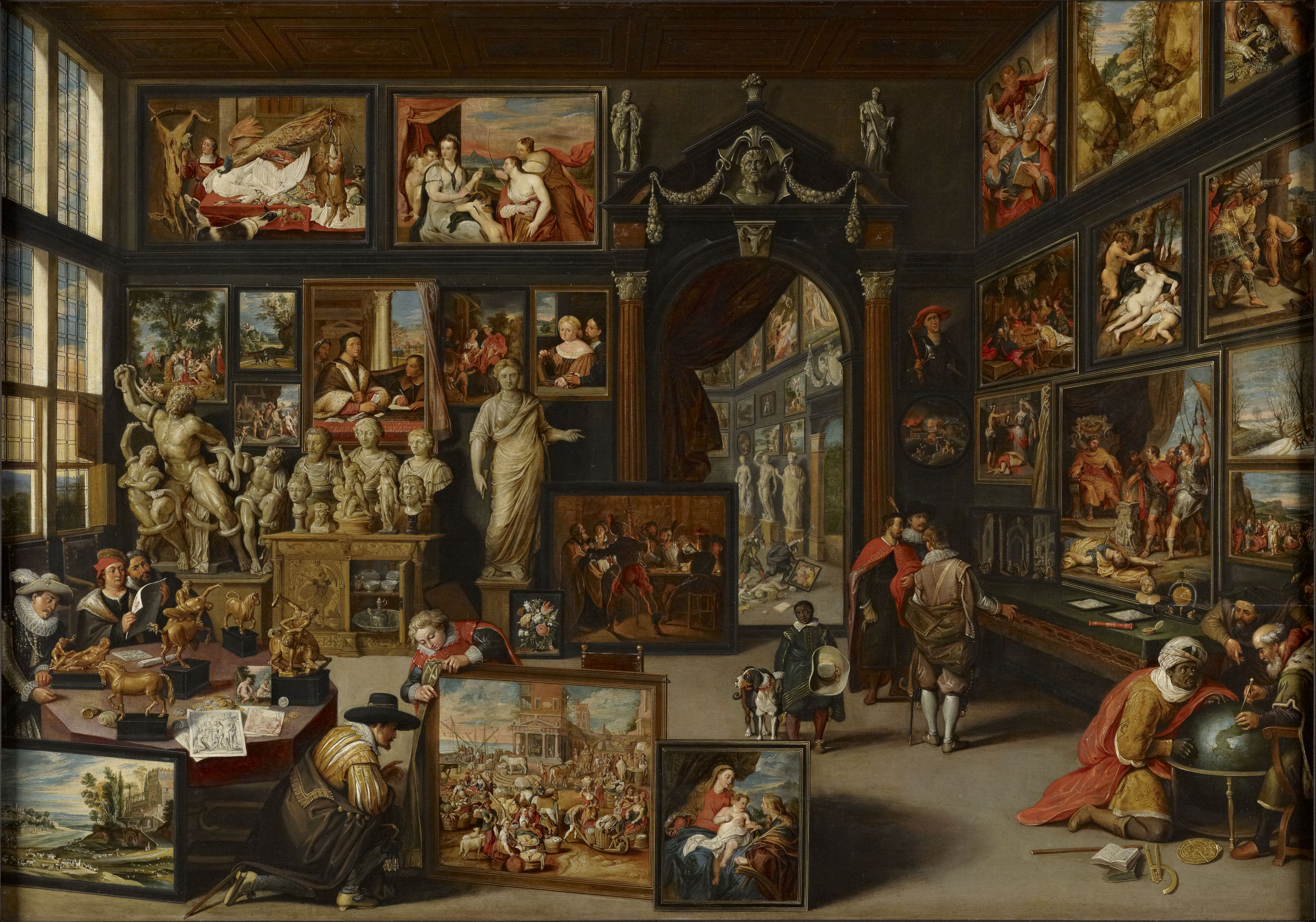
Willem van Haecht Apelles Painting Campaspe (c. 1630)

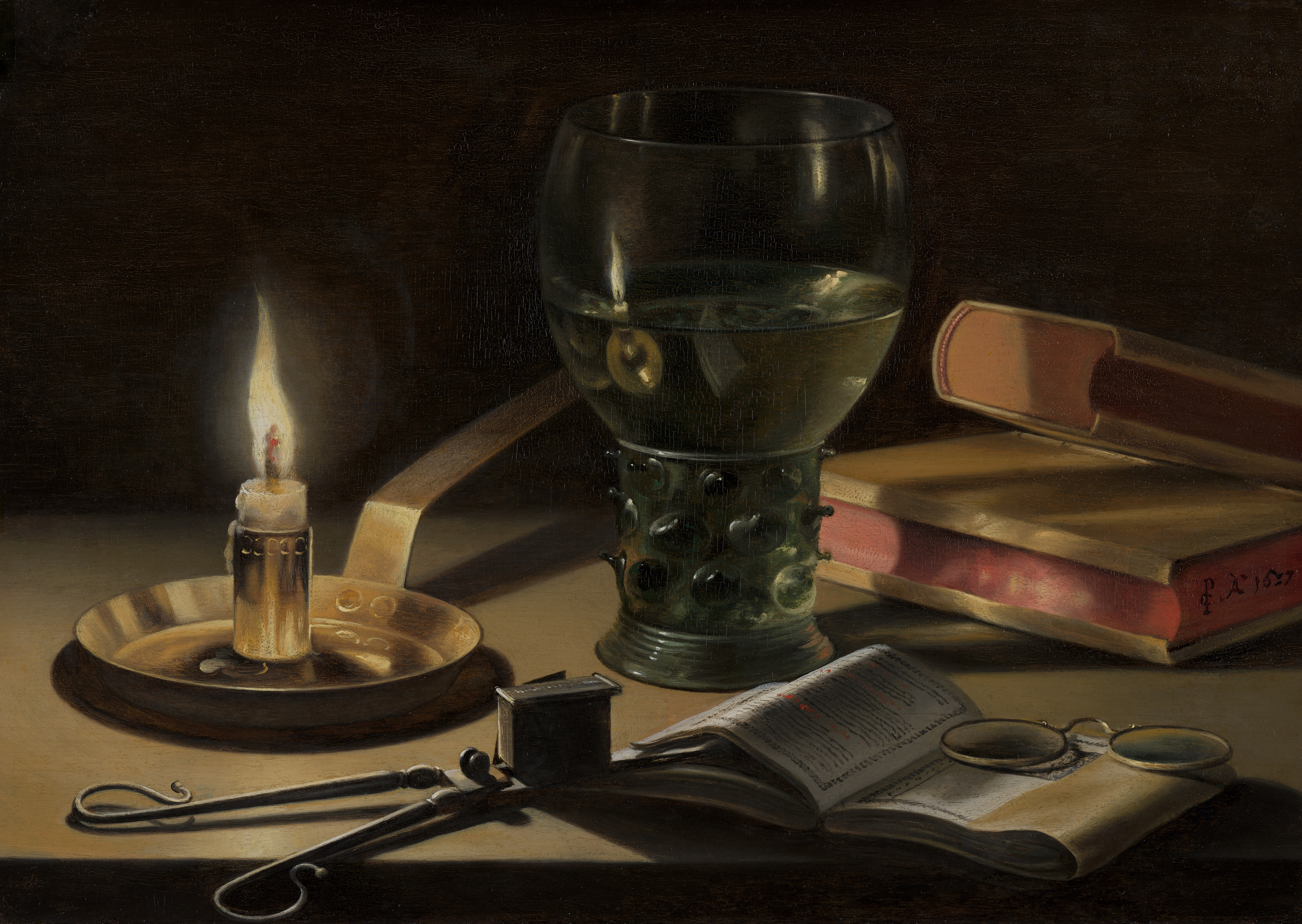
Pieter Claesz Still Life with Lighted Candle (1627)

== Administration ==
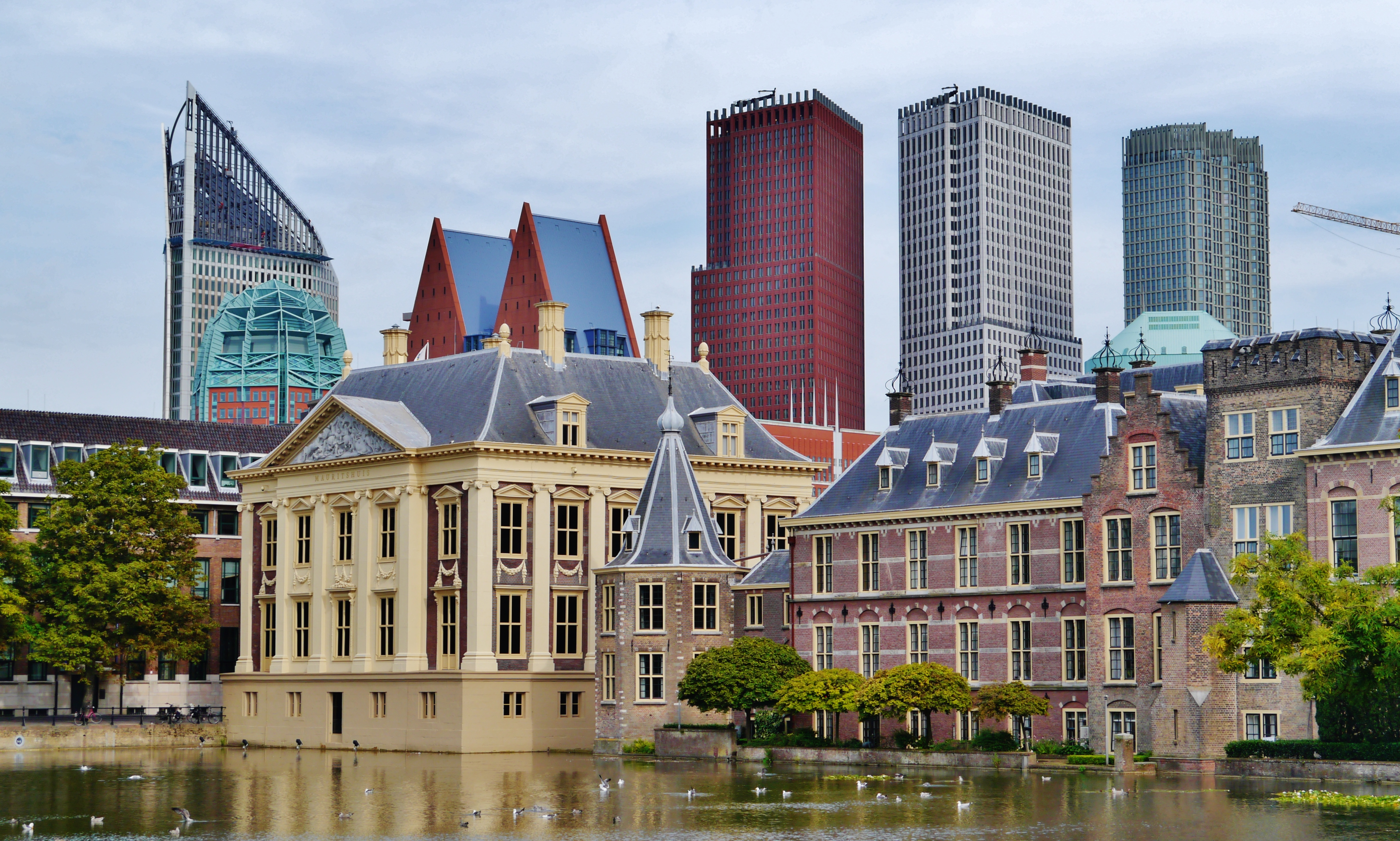
The Mauritshuis seen next to the Torentje

The Mauritshuis was a state museum until 1995, when it became an independent foundation. It still continues to receive funding from the Dutch central government. For its estimated budget for 2024, the government provided just under a third (€5 million) of its total €16-million budget. The Prince William V Gallery is also managed by the organisation.

The museum has a staff of around 91 people. Emilie Elise Saskia Gordenker was museum director from 2008 until 2020. Martine Gosselink assumed the directorship in February 2020. Victor Moussault served as deputy director from 2007 until 2016, succeeded by Sander Uitdenbogaard in 2017.

In the period 2005 to 2011, the Mauritshuis saw between 205,000 and 262,000 visitors a year. In 2011, the museum was the 13th most visited museum in the Netherlands. In 2012, when the museum closed for renovation on 1 April, it received 45,981 visitors. The museum was closed all of 2013 and was reopened on 27 June 2014. It closed for three months in the spring of 2020 in response to the COVID-19 pandemic.

=== Visitors ===
Year	Visitors	Year	Visitors	Year	Visitors	Year	Visitors		
2005	222,477 (est.)	2010	231,795	2015	500,476	2020	138,916		
2006	244,610 (est.)	2011	261,127	2016	414,239	2021	113,000 (est)		
2007	230,000 (est.)	2012	45,981	2017	417,227	2022	400,000 (est)		
2008	240,000 (est.)	2013	closed	2018	416,334	2023	451,193		
2009	205,678	2014	322,000 (est.)	2019	481,667	2024	477,222	2025	497,416
