= Jacob van Ruisdael exhibition 2005–2006 =

The following is the list of 58 paintings indexed as autograph by Jacob van Ruisdael, in a catalogue written by the art historian and Ruisdael specialist Seymour Slive in 2005 for the traveling exhibition Jacob van Ruisdael: master of landscape in Los Angeles, Philadelphia, and London. The list is by catalogue number and is more or less in order of creation, starting from around 1645 when Ruisdael began painting on his own.

Cat. no.	Image	Title	Year	Collection	Inventory no.
1		Landscape with a Cottage and Trees	1646	Kunsthalle Hamburg	159
2		Landscape with a Windmill	1646	Cleveland Museum of Art	1967.19
3		Peasant Cottage in a Landscape	1646	Hermitage Museum	ГЭ-939
4		Entrance to a Wood	1646	Academy of Fine Arts Vienna	GG-1368
5		Blasted Oak near a Pond	1647	Museum of Fine Arts, Budapest	263
6		View of Naarden and the church of Muiderberg	1647	Thyssen-Bornemisza Museum	354 (1930.99)
7		Bridge with a Sluice	1648	J. Paul Getty Museum	86.PB.597
8		Old elm tree with view of Egmond aan Zee	1648	Currier Museum of Art	
9		Dunes by the Sea	1648	private collection	
10		A Bleaching Ground in a Hollow by a Cottage	1640–1649	National Gallery	NG44
11		Landscape with river and cellar entrance	1649	Kunsthistorisches Museum	GG_9807
12		The Banks of a River	1649	National Galleries of Scotland	NGL 033.84
13		Landscape with a Windmill near a Town Moat	1650s	private collection	
14		The Castle at Bentheim	1651	private collection	
15		Castle Bentheim	1651–1655	private collection	
16		Castle Bentheim	1653	National Gallery of Ireland	NGI.4531
17		Two Watermills and an Open Sluice	1650s	J. Paul Getty Museum	82.PA.18
18		Landscape with the Ruins of the Castle of Egmond	1650–55	Art Institute of Chicago	1947.475
19		Hilly Wooded Landscape with Castle	1650s	Duke of Buccleuch collection	
20		The Great Oak	1652	Los Angeles County Museum of Art	M.91.164.1
21		Hilly Landscape	1652–1655	Herzog Anton Ulrich Museum	376
22		The Jewish Cemetery	1650s	Gemäldegalerie Alte Meister	1502
23		Edge of a Forest with a Grainfield	1655	Kimbell Art Museum	
24		Rough Sea at a Jetty	1650s	Kimbell Art Museum	AP 1989.01
25		Wooded River Bank	1650s	Gemäldegalerie	885H
26		View from the Dunes to the Sea	1650s	Kunsthaus Zürich	R 31
27		Dunes	1650s	Philadelphia Museum of Art	Cat. 563
28		Dune Landscape with a Rabbit Hunt	1650s	Frans Hals Museum	os I-299
29		Ruins of Brederode	1655	Philadelphia Museum of Art	Cat. 564
30		Cottage under Trees near a Grainfield	1650–55	private collection	
31		Kostverloren House on the Amstel	1660s	Amsterdam Museum	SA 38217
32		Forest Scene	1660	National Gallery of Art	1942.9.80
33		Waterfall with a Half-Timbered House and Castle	1665–1670	Fogg Museum	1953.2
34		Waterfall in a Mountainous Landscape with a Ruined Castle	1665–70	private collection	
35		Landscape with Waterfall	1660s	Rijksmuseum; Amsterdam Museum	SK-C-210; SA 8297
36		Grove of Large Oak Trees at the Edge of a Pond	1665	Staatliche Kunsthalle Karlsruhe	2565
37		A Wooded Marsh	1665	Hermitage Museum	ГЭ-934
38		Stag Hunt in a Wood with a Marsh	1665–70	Gemäldegalerie Alte Meister	1492
39		The Windmill at Wijk bij Duurstede	1660s	Rijksmuseum; Amsterdam Museum	SK-C-211; SA 8296
40		Landscape with a Sluice Gate	1665–70	Toledo Museum of Art	1978.68
41		Sailing Vessels in a Choppy Sea	1665	private collection	
42		A Village in Winter	1665	Alte Pinakothek	117
43		Winter Landscape	1660s	Philadelphia Museum of Art	Cat. 569
44		View of Grainfields with a Distant Town	1665–1670	Los Angeles County Museum of Art	M.2009.106.12
45		A Landscape with a Ruined Castle and a Church	1665	National Gallery	NG990
46		View of the Plain of Haarlem with Bleaching Grounds	1660s	private collection	
47		View of the Dunes near Bloemendaal with Bleaching Fields	1660s	private collection	
48		View of bleaching fields and Haarlem	1670	Mauritshuis	155
49		View of Haarlem with Bleaching Fields	1670–75	Kunsthaus Zürich	
50		View of the Ruins of Huis ter Kleef and Haarlem	1675–80	Musée Jacquemart-André	
51		Rough Sea	1670	Museum of Fine Arts	57.4
52		The Zuiderzee Coast near Muiden	1675	Polesden Lacey	1246494
53		The Ray of Light	1665	Department of Paintings of the Louvre	INV 1820
54		Mountainous Landscape	1670s	Hermitage Museum	ГЭ-932
55		Winter Landscape near Haarlem	1670s	Städel	1109
56		Winter Landscape with Two Windmills	1675–80	Eijk and Rose-Marie van Otterloo Collection	
57		The Dam Square in Amsterdam with the Weigh House	1675	Gemäldegalerie	885D
58		View on the Amstel Looking towards Amsterdam	1670s	Fitzwilliam Museum	74

== See also ==
- List of paintings by Jacob van Ruisdael
- Haerlempjes

== Sources ==
- Jacob van Ruisdael: Master of Landscape, exhibition catalogue for the Los Angeles County Museum of Art, Philadelphia Museum of Art, and Royal Academy of Arts by Seymour Slive, London: Royal Academy of Arts, 2005, on archive.org, ISBN 9781903973745
- Jacob van Ruisdael: master of landscape, Los Angeles County Museum of Art (LACMA) press release from April 2005 on Codart.nl
