= Winter View of the Hekelveld in Amsterdam =

17th-century painting by Jacob van Ruisdael

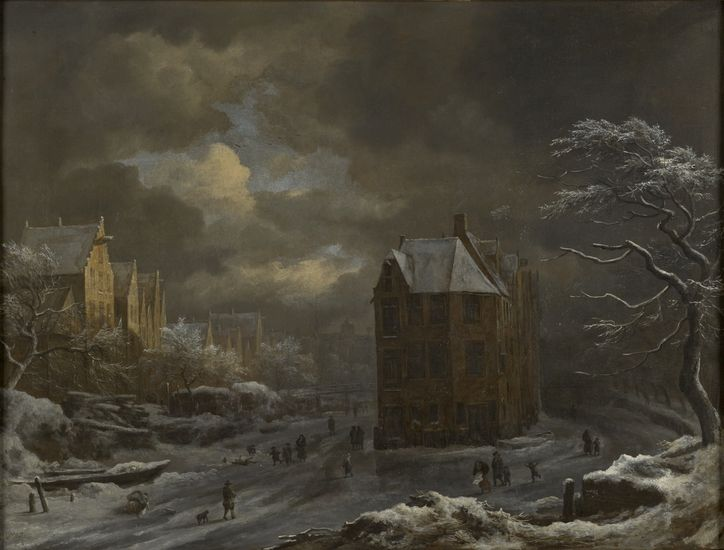
Winter View of the Hekelveld in Amsterdam by Jacob van Ruisdael

Winter View of the Hekelveld in Amsterdam is a 17th-century oil on canvas painting by the Dutch Golden Age painter Jacob van Ruisdael. It is in a private collection in Scotland.

The painting depicts the Hekelveld, a square in Amsterdam, with two frozen canals, both of which were filled in during the 19th century. In the distance one can discern the tower of the New Town Hall and the spire of the Nieuwe Kerk. This makes it highly likely that the painting was made after 1665, as records show that the town hall's tower was not finished until then, and in or before 1682, the year of Ruisdael's death.

The painting is catalogue number 9 in Seymour Slive's 2001 catalogue raisonné of Ruisdael, though is not present in the 1911 catalogue raisonné by art historian Hofstede de Groot. Its dimensions are 49.5 cm x 65 cm. It is signed in the lower left. It changed hands in 1996.

== See also ==
- List of paintings by Jacob van Ruisdael
