= View of Egmond aan Zee =

Painting by Jacob van Ruisdael

- Artist: Jacob van Ruisdael
- Year: 1650s
- Dimensions: 31 cm × 35 cm (12 in × 14 in)
- Location: Nationalmuseum; Stockholm

View of Egmond aan Zee (c. 1650s) is an oil on canvas painting by the Dutch landscape painter Jacob van Ruisdael. It is an example of Dutch Golden Age painting and is now in the collection of the Nationalmuseum in Stockholm.

This painting was documented by Hofstede de Groot in 1911, who wrote;

"50. VIEW OF EGMOND AAN ZEE. The village lies in

the middle distance, with the sea beyond. The church with its stumpy square tower rises above the houses. In the foreground is a sunlit road through the dunes. The sun's rays also fall on the sea and on a sailing-boat to the right. Blue sky with clouds. A variation of 47.

Signed on the left with the monogram; panel, 12 inches by 14 inches. Etched by L. Lowenstam and R. Norstedt. In the collection of Louisa Ulrica, Queen of Sweden, and there attributed to Rembrandt. In the collection of Gustavus III., King of Sweden. In the National Museum, Stockholm, 1900 catalogue, No. 618."

This scene is very similar to other paintings Ruisdael made of Egmond aan Zee and these were perhaps popular because the townsfolk already knew that erosion was threatening their village and had moved their homes and businesses further inland. The choir of the church was already in ruins and the tower was in use as a beacon for ships. Storms had steadily eroded the coast since a major flood in 1570, and in the 18th century, the village as it is depicted here definitely disappeared in the waves. As a ghost town, it was something of an early tourist attraction. Today the modern town is also threatened, as the coast is still eroding further eastwards.

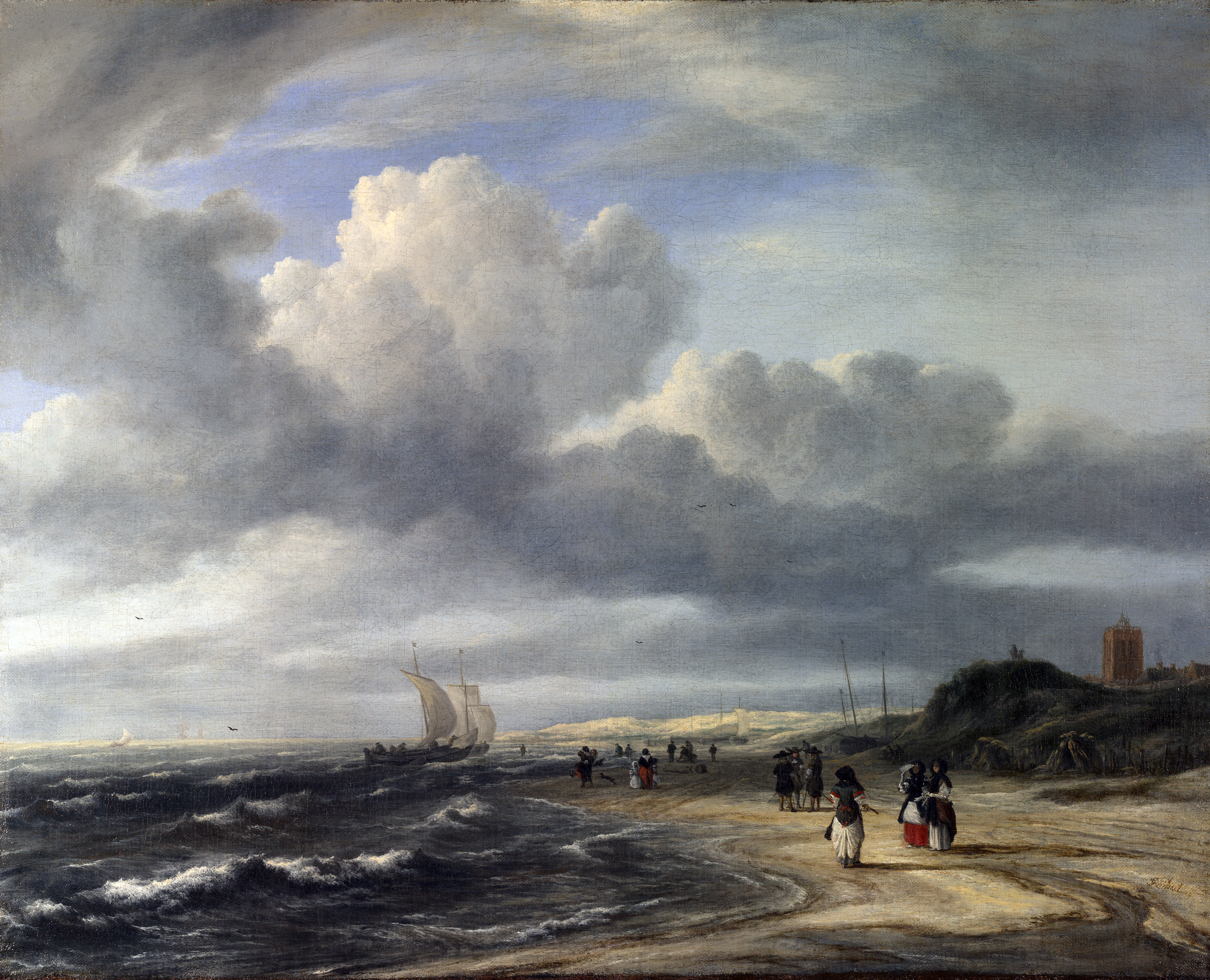
National Gallery

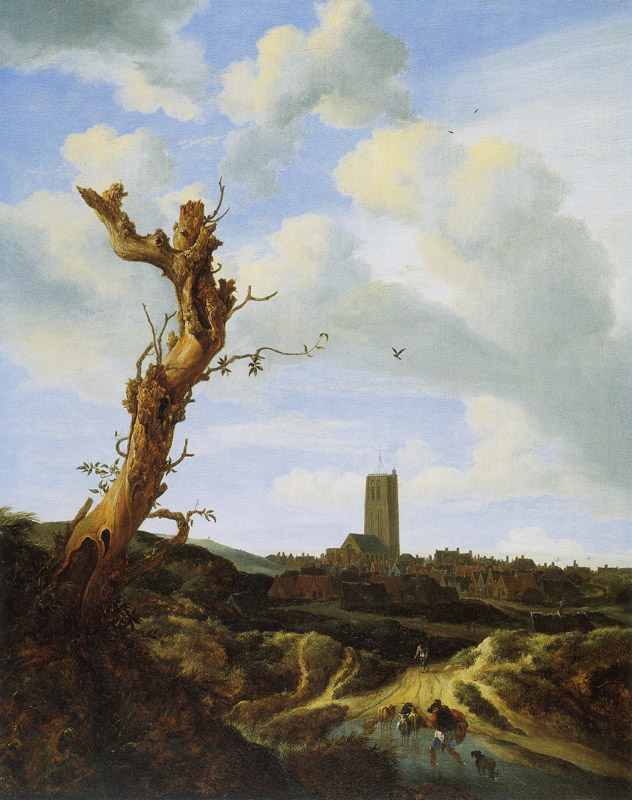
Currier Museum of Art

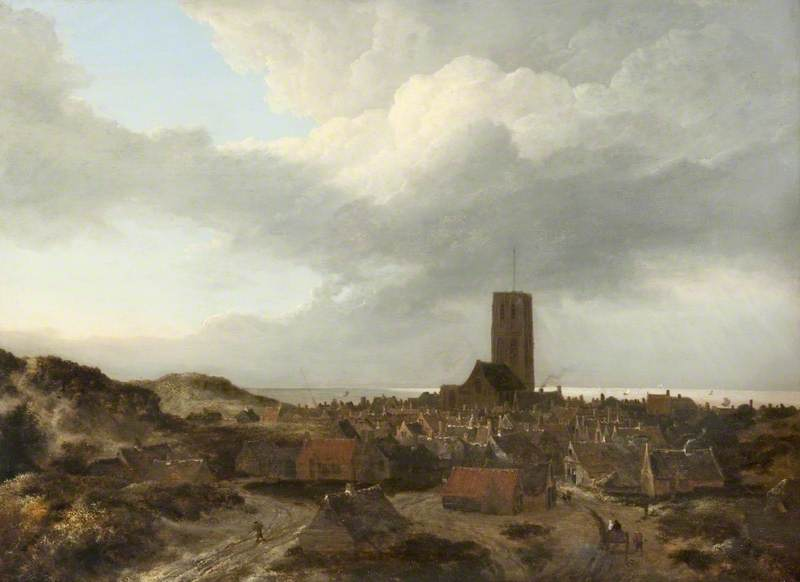
Kelvingrove Art Gallery (#47 as mentioned by Hofstede de Groot)

== See also ==
- List of paintings by Jacob van Ruisdael
