= A Thatch-Roofed House with a Water Mill =

Painting by Jacob Isaacksz. van Ruisdael

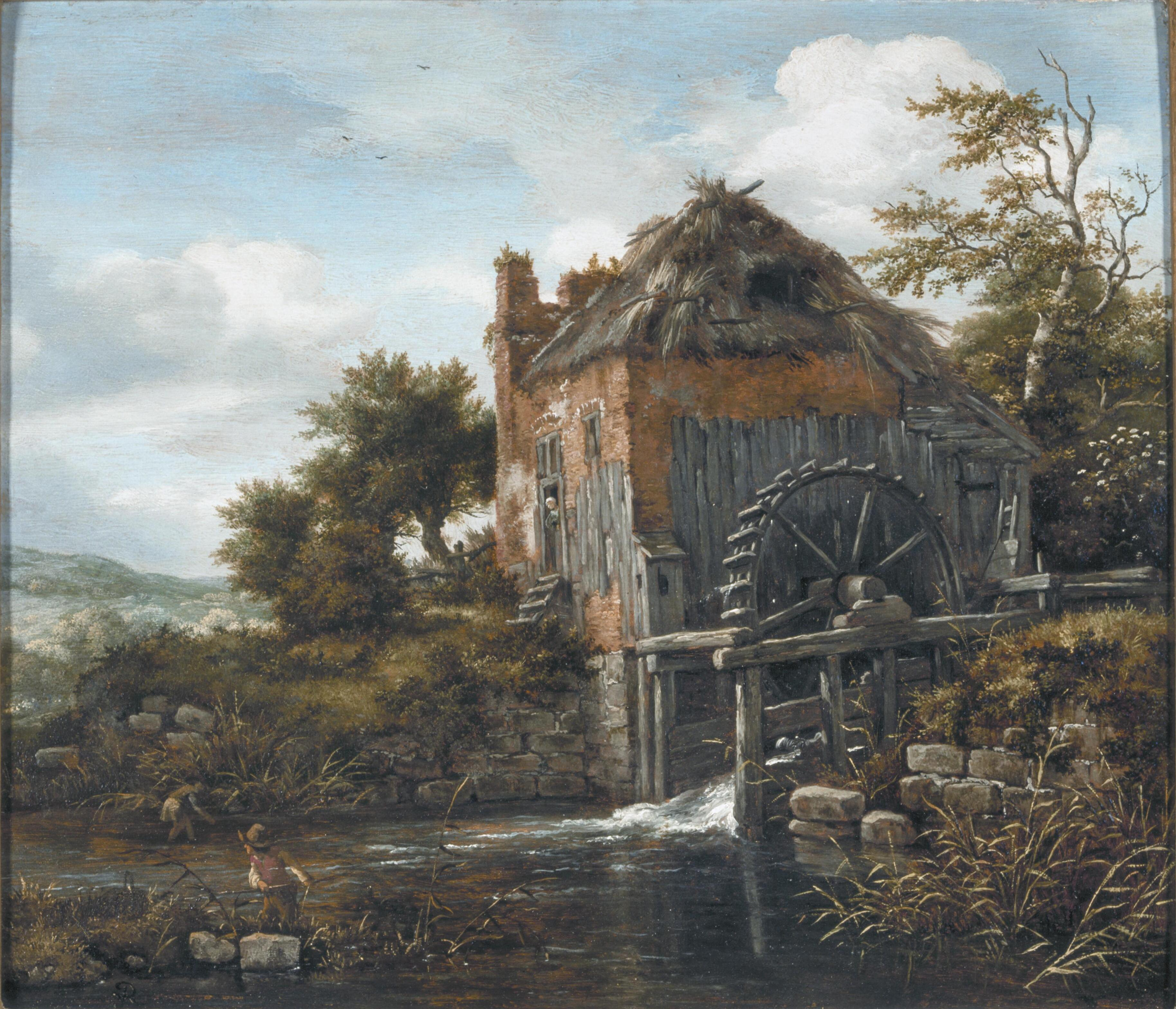
250pxA Thatch-Roofed House with a Water Mill - Jacob van Ruisdael

A Thatch-Roofed House with a Water Mill, also known as Water Mill near a Farm, is a 17th-century oil on panel painting by the Dutch Golden Age painter Jacob van Ruisdael. It is in the collection of the Museum Boijmans Van Beuningen in Rotterdam.

English painter John Constable saw the painting in 1826 and wrote "It haunts my mind and clings to my heart".

The painting is catalogue number 121 in Seymour Slive's 2001 catalogue raisonné of Ruisdael. The painting is number 165 in the 1911 catalogue raisonné by art historian Hofstede de Groot, and number 2025 in the museum's catalogue. Its dimensions are 36 cm x 42 cm. It is monogrammed in the lower left. It is not dated, but Slive writes it is dateable to about 1653. The monogram uses two different hues to give a three dimensional effect, a technique Ruisdael applied in a few other paintings that were actually dated 1652 and 1653. Museum Boymans van Beuningen dates it circa 1660.

It was restored in 1997.

== See also ==
- List of paintings by Jacob van Ruisdael
