= A Waterfall in a Rocky Landscape =

Painting by Jacob van Ruisdael

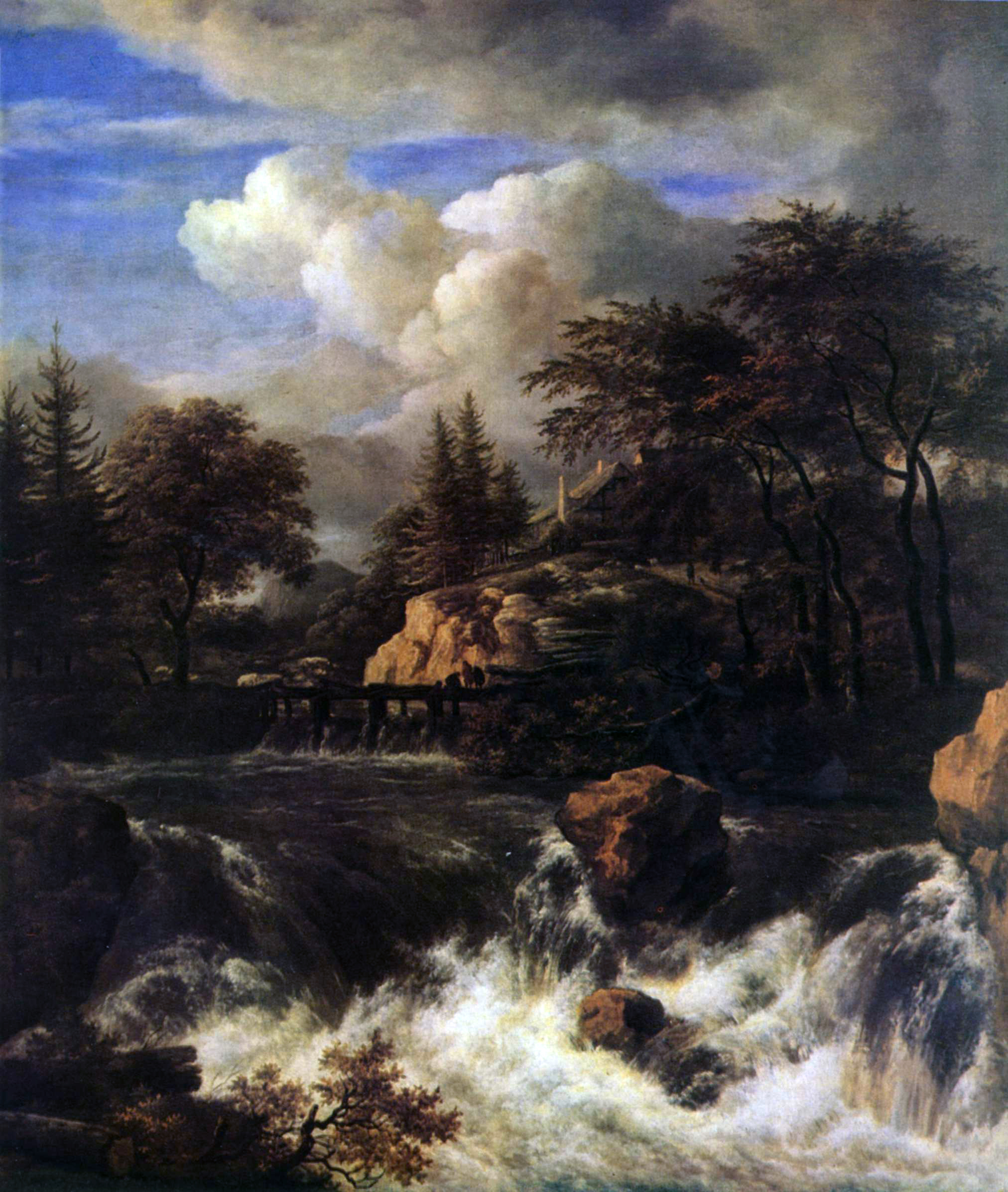
- Artist: Jacob van Ruisdael
- Year: 1660s
- Dimensions: 98.5 cm × 85 cm (38.8 in × 33 in)
- Location: National Gallery; London

A Waterfall in a Rocky Landscape (c. 1660s) is an oil painting on canvas by the Dutch landscape painter Jacob van Ruisdael. It is an example of Dutch Golden Age painting and is now in the collection of the National Gallery.

This painting was documented by Hofstede de Groot in 1911, who wrote; "239. LANDSCAPE WITH WATERFALL. The waterfall fills the whole foreground, rushing down over rocks from a broad basin. In the left foreground a fallen tree hangs over the water. In the left middle distance is a wooden bridge, with firs and leafy trees to the left of it. To the right on the bank are leafy trees, one of which has fallen and hangs over the water. Behind the trees on a high bank is a cottage, with firs to the left of it. Dark cloudy sky. [Pendant to 240.]

Signed in full, "J. Ruysdael"; canvas, 40 1/2 inches by 34 inches. Engraved in mezzotint by J. G. Prestel. Sale. Count von Brabeck and Count Andreas von Stolberg of Soder, Hanover, October 31, 1859, No. 235 (£1187 : 15 : 6, for the National Gallery). In the National Gallery, London, 1906 catalogue, No. 627."

A Waterfall in a Rocky Landscape is very similar to other paintings by the artist from between 1660 and 1670. Although the depicted landscape is Scandinavia, Ruisdael never left a record of visiting foreign countries outside Germany. From the middle of the 1650s he produced a series of waterfalls over boulders, surrounded by high pine trees, inspired by the work of the artist Allaert van Everdingen, who visited Norway and Sweden in 1644.

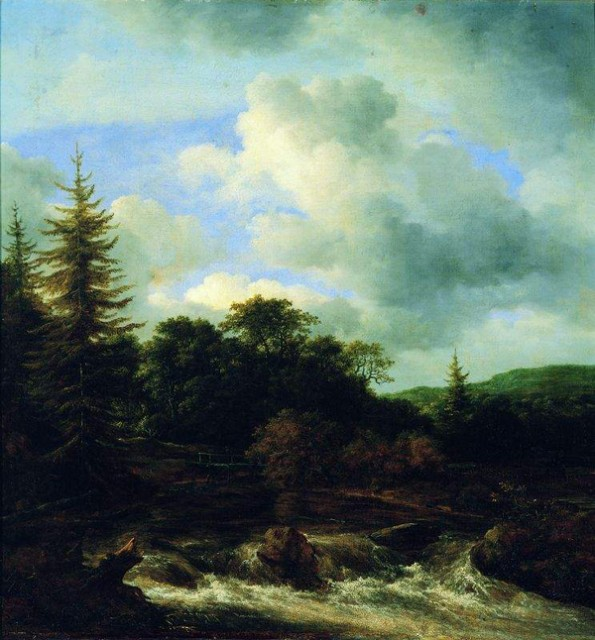
National Museum in Warsaw.

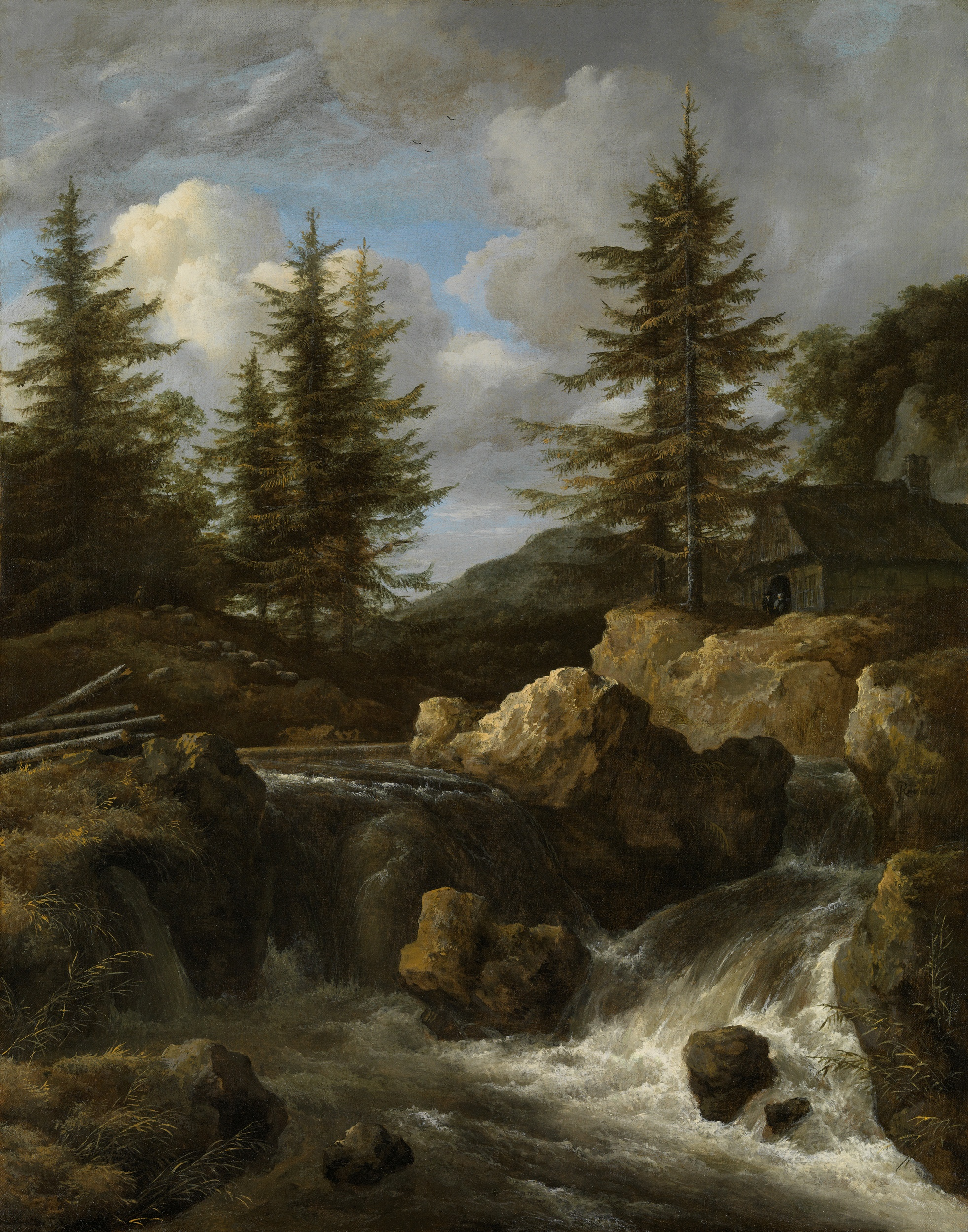
Liechtenstein Museum.

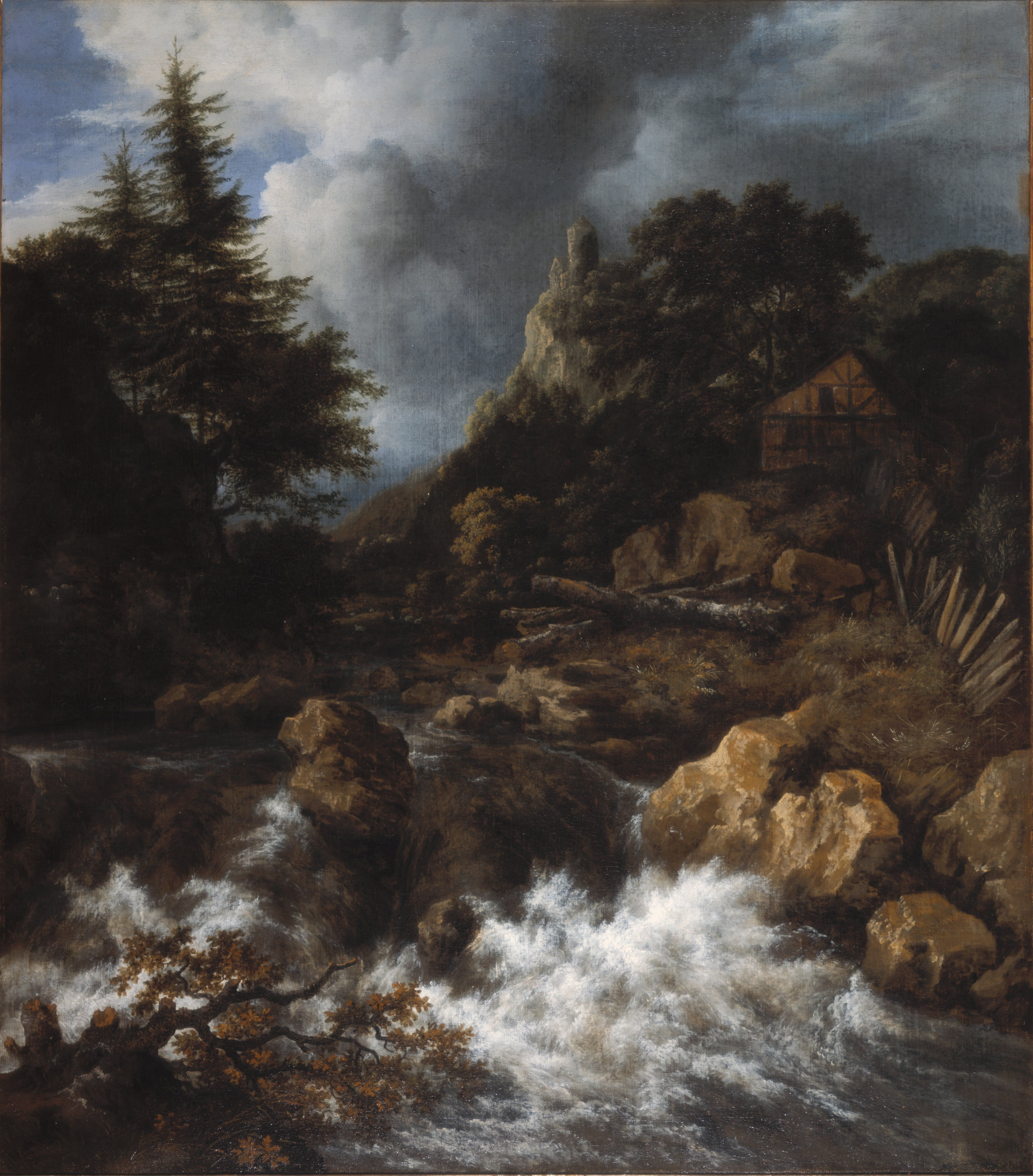
Fogg Museum.

== See also ==
- List of paintings by Jacob van Ruisdael
