= The Watermill (Ruisdael) =

Painting by Jacob Van Ruisdael

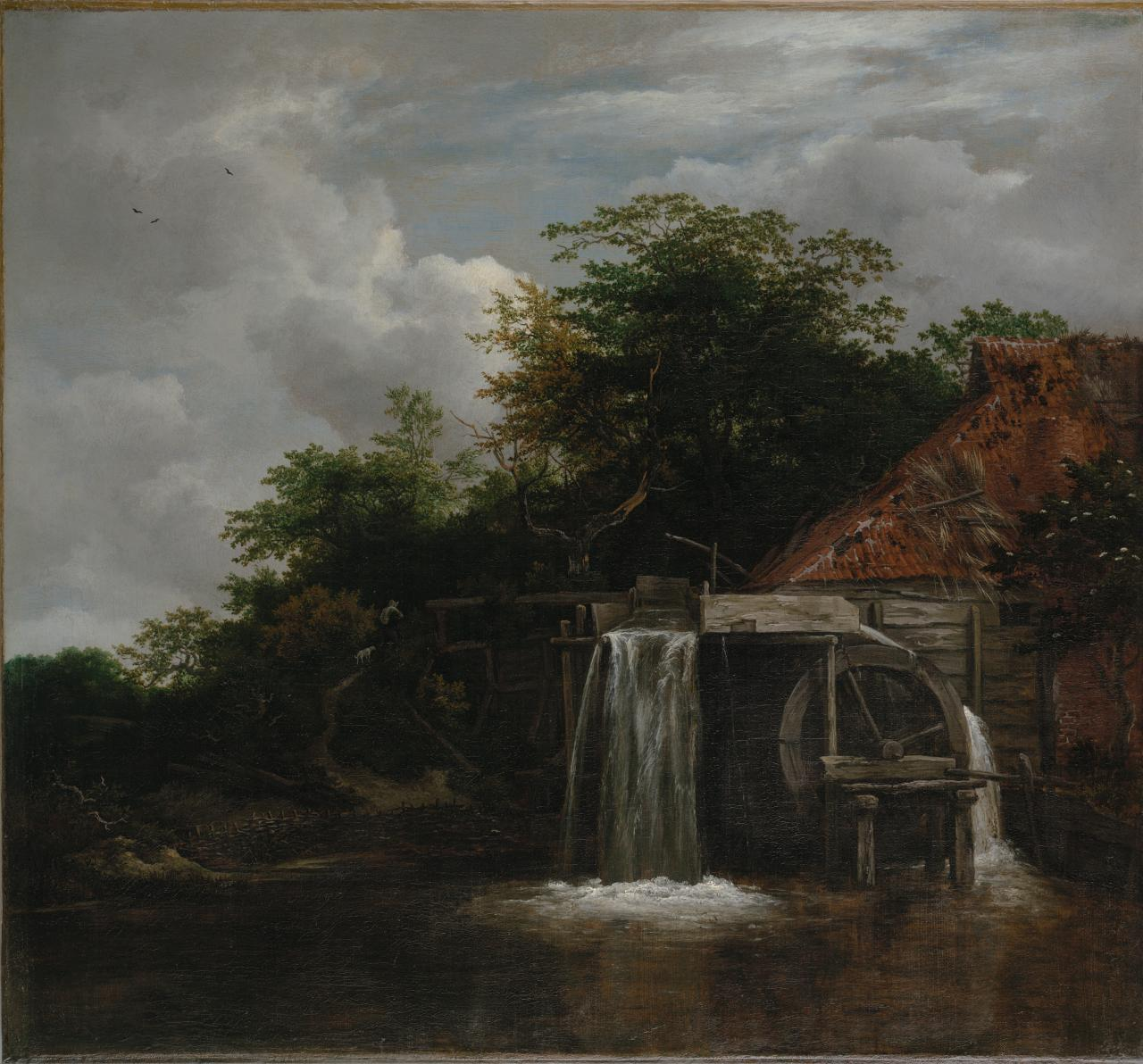
- Artist: Jacob van Ruisdael
- Year: c. 1660
- Dimensions: 64.7 cm × 70.8 cm (25.5 in × 27.9 in)
- Location: National Gallery of Victoria; Melbourne
- Website: www.ngv.vic.gov.au/explore/collection/work/4325/

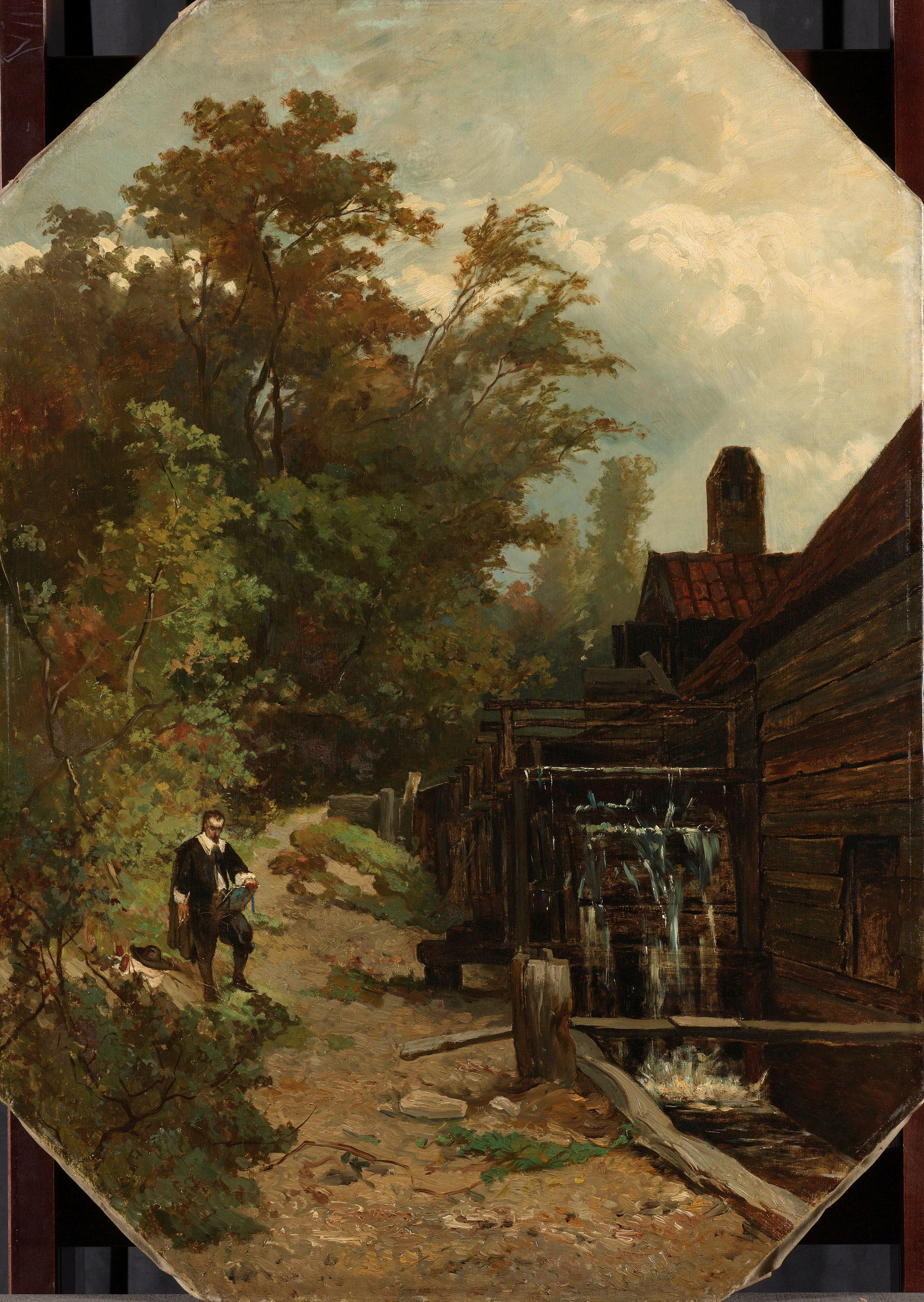
Historical painting of Jacob van Ruisdael sketching a watermill in Gelderland, by Gerard Bilders, a 19th-century landscape painter who was inspired by Ruisdael's work

The Watermill (c. 1660) is an oil on canvas painting by the Dutch landscape painter Jacob van Ruisdael. It is an example of Dutch Golden Age painting and is now in the collection of the National Gallery of Victoria.

This painting was documented by Hofstede de Groot in 1911, who wrote:

146. THE WATER-MILL. View across the mill-pool towards

the water-mill, which stands amid trees. The same mill as that painted by Hobbema, as, for example, in the two pictures at the Rijksmuseum (see Hobbema, 66, 67). The building on the right is roofed with red tiles, and the timbers are grey. To the left is a green hill. There is no distant view. On the road to the left is a man, followed by a dog. To the right is a flowering elder bush. To judge from the style, the picture was probably painted about the time when Hobbema and Ruisdael worked together (1660-63). Signed with the monogram on the left; canvas, 25 inches by 27 1/2 inches.

Exhibited at the Royal Academy Winter Exhibition, London, 1876, No. 80, and 1902, No. 134.

In the collection of the Right Hon. Lewis Fry, Clifton, Bristol.

This scene is very similar to other paintings Ruisdael and his pupil Hobbema made in this period and these often served as inspiration for later painters of landscape.

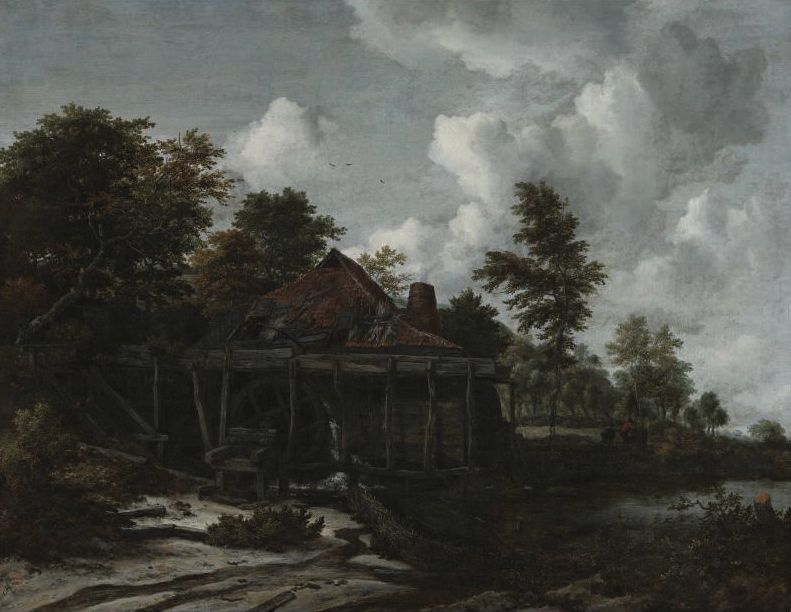
Private collection, by Jacob and formerly in the Toledo Museum of Art.

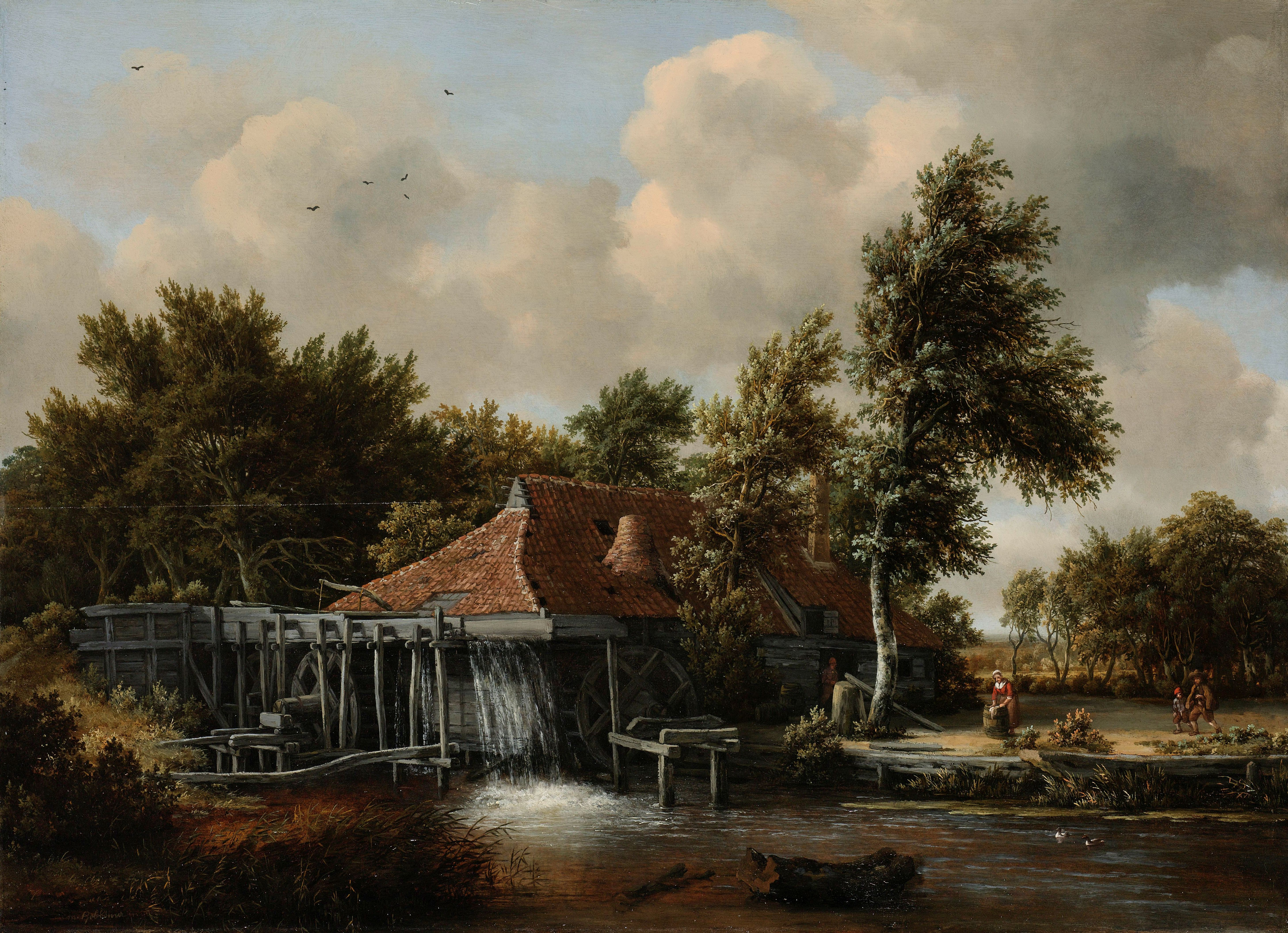
Rijksmuseum, by Hobbema.

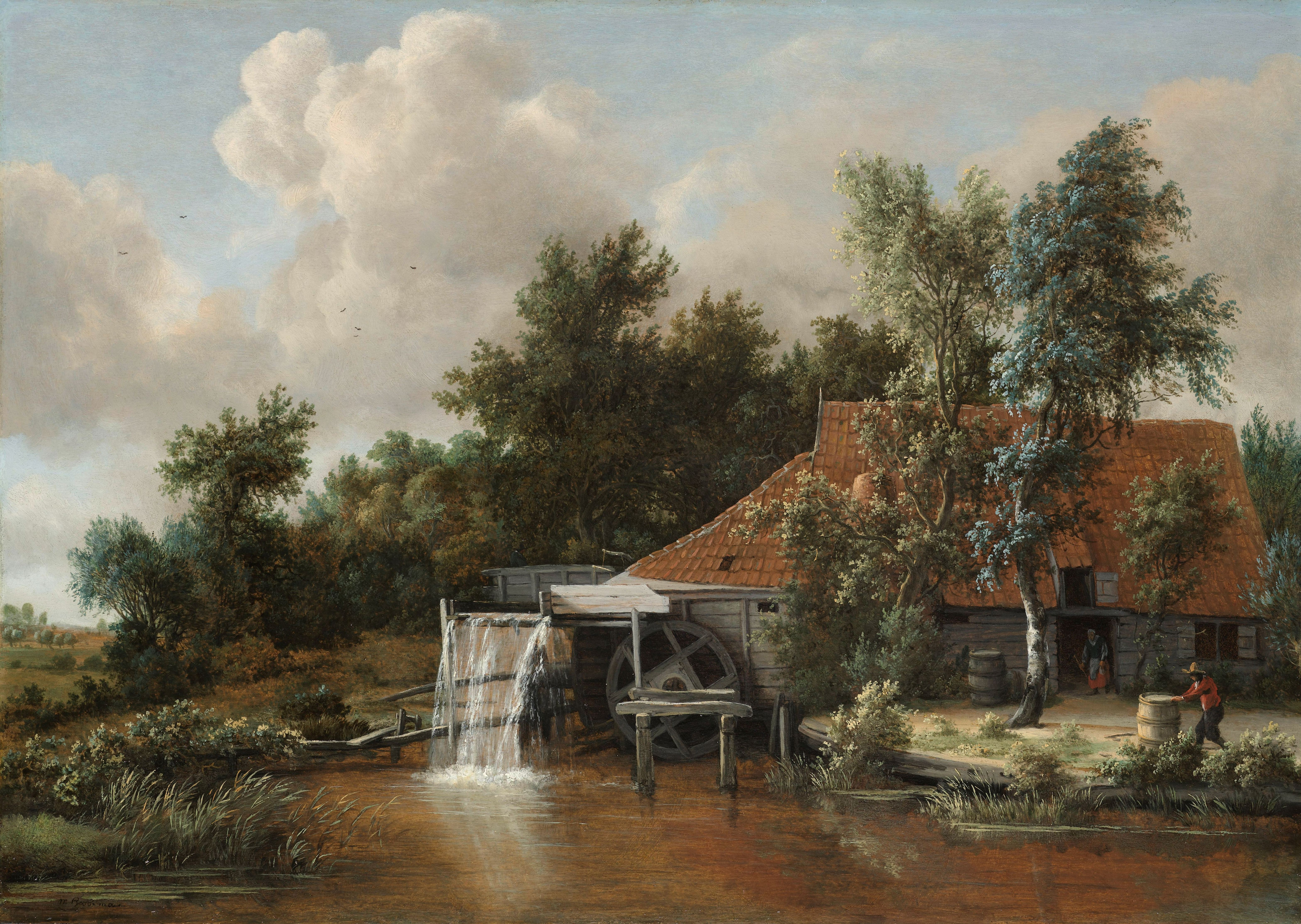
Rijksmuseum, by Hobbema.

Scholars have tried to locate this specific watermill as it was portrayed so many times, but so far it has only been documented as being "somewhere in Gelderland",.

== See also ==
- List of paintings by Jacob van Ruisdael
