= Dune Landscape near Haarlem =

17th-century painting by Jacob van Ruisdael

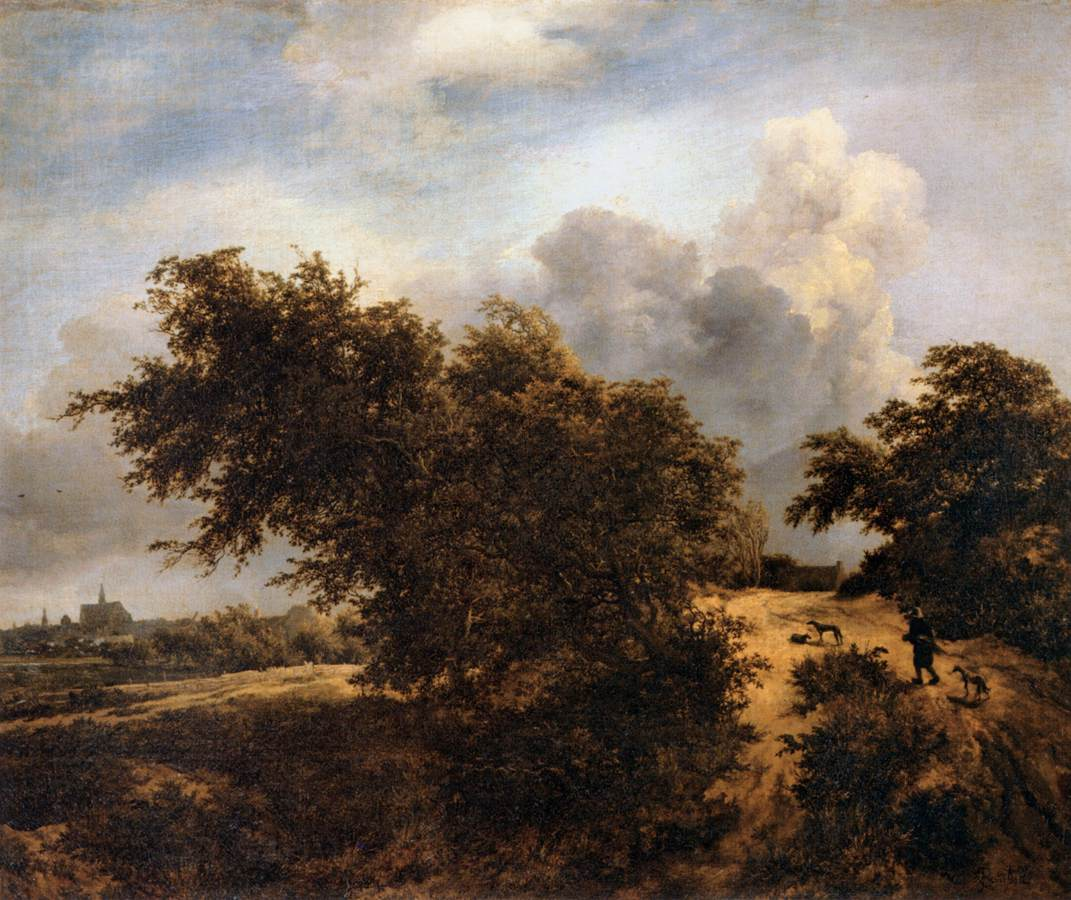
Dune Landscape near Haarlem by Jacob van Ruisdael

Dune Landscape near Haarlem, also known as The Bush and The Thicket near Haarlem, is an oil on canvas painting by the Dutch Golden Age painter Jacob van Ruisdael. It is in the collection of the Louvre in Paris.

The painting is called Dune Landscape near Haarlem in Slive's 2001 catalogue raisonné of Ruisdael, catalogue number 60. Hofstede de Groot called it Landscape near Haarlem or The Bush in his 1911 catalogue raisonne; catalogue number 890.

The painting is not dated. Slive dates it to 1647. The Louvre dates it 1653. It was in the collection of King Louis XVI.

In the 19th century Vincent van Gogh called this painting by Ruisdael, along with The Breakwater and Ray of Light, "magnificent".

The Louvre has in French: "Le Buisson ou Chemin dans les dunes harlemoises". Its inventory number is INV. 1819. Its dimensions are 68 cm x 82 cm.

== See also ==
- List of paintings by Jacob van Ruisdael
