= View of the Binnenamstel at Amsterdam =

Painting by Jacob van Ruisdael

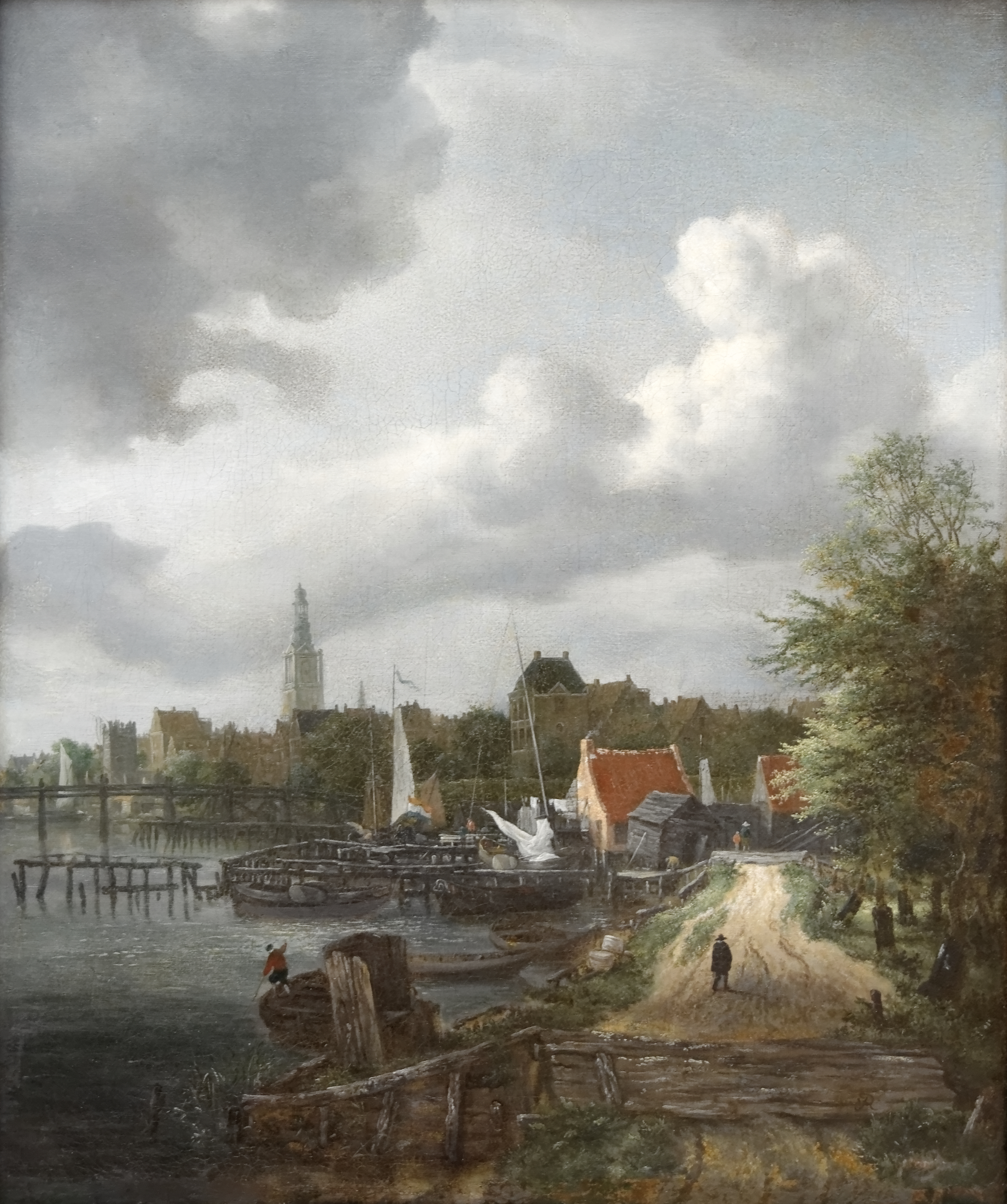
View of the Binnenamstel at Amsterdam

View of the Binnenamstel at Amsterdam is a 17th-century oil on canvas painting by the Dutch Golden Age painter Jacob van Ruisdael. It is in the collection of the Museum of Fine Arts in Budapest.

The painting is catalogue number 15 in the 1911 catalogue raisonné by art historian Hofstede de Groot. He wrote "The spectator looks towards the old Jachthaven and the Blaauwbrug, from the canal-bank where the Deaconesses' Home for Old Women was erected later." The painting is catalogue number 2 in Seymour Slive's 2001 catalogue raisonné of Ruisdael. Its inventory number for the Museum of Fine Arts is 4278 .

Its dimensions are 52.5 cm x 43.5 cm.

== See also ==
- List of paintings by Jacob van Ruisdael
