= Storm Off a Sea Coast =

1670 painting by Jacob van Ruisdael

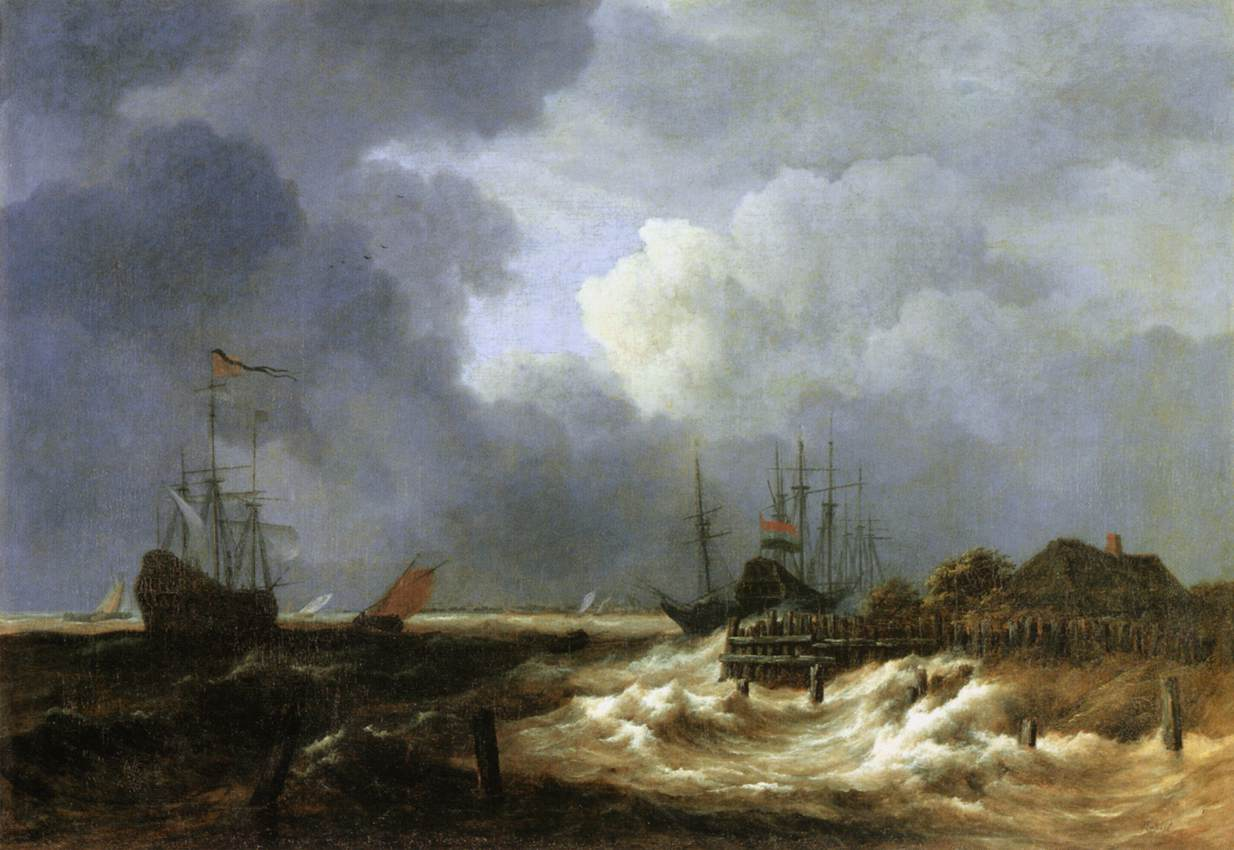
Storm Off a Sea Coast, also known as The Breakwater, by Jacob van Ruisdael

Storm Off a Sea Coast, also known as The Breakwater, is a 1670 oil on canvas painting by the Dutch Golden Age painter Jacob van Ruisdael. It is in the collection of the Louvre in Paris.

The painting is called A Storm at Sea Off the Dykes of Holland in the 1911 catalogue raisonné compiled by Cornelis Hofstede de Groot, in which it is catalogue number 961. De Groot described the scene: "On the right is a dyke lined with piles, beyond which is a fisherman's cottage with a few trees. On the left corner of the dyke, great waves are breaking. Farther back rise the masts of several large vessels, as well as the stern with a Dutch flag." The painting is called Storm Off a Sea Coast in Slive's 2001 catalogue raisonné of Ruisdael, in which it is given catalogue number 653.

In the 19th century, Vincent van Gogh called this painting by Ruisdael, along with The Bush and Ray of Light, "magnificent". The Louvre has in French: "L'Estacade ou Gros temps sur une digue de Hollande, dit aussi Une tempête". Its inventory number is INV. 1818. Its dimensions are 110 cm x 160 cm.

== See also ==
- List of paintings by Jacob van Ruisdael
