= List of paintings by Jacob van Ruisdael =

The following is an incomplete list of paintings by Jacob van Ruisdael that are generally accepted as autograph by Seymour Slive and other sources. The list is ordered by "Slive no.", the code applied by Slive in his 2001 catalogue raisonné. The earliest paintings date from around 1645 when Jacob began painting on his own. Prior to that, he was assistant to his father Isaack van Ruisdael and his uncle Salomon van Ruysdael.

Image	Title	Date	Collection	Inventory number	Slive no.
	The Dam Square in Amsterdam with the Weigh House	1675	Gemäldegalerie	885D	1
	View of Binnen-Amstel in Amsterdam	1656	Museum of Fine Arts, Budapest		2
	View on the Amstel Looking towards Amsterdam	1670s	Fitzwilliam Museum	74	3
	View on the Amstel from Amsteldijk	1680	Amsterdam Museum	SA 56435	4
	View of Amsterdam	1665s	National Gallery private collection	L1052	5
	View of the Damrak in Amsterdam	1670s	Amsterdam Museum; Mauritshuis	SB 6330	6
	Quay at Amsterdam	1670s	Frick Collection	1910.1.110	7
	The Damrak in Amsterdam	1670	Museum Boijmans Van Beuningen	1744 (OK)	8
	Winter View of the Hekelveld in Amsterdam	1670s	Mount Stuart House		9
	Bentheim Castle	1650s	Rijksmuseum	SK-A-347	10
	Schloss Bentheim	1660s	Gemäldegalerie Alte Meister	Gal.-Nr. 1496	14
	Castle Bentheim	1653	National Gallery of Ireland	NGI.4531	15
	Mountainous landscape with a waterfall, in the background on the right Bentheim castle	1660s	private collection		16
	The Castle of Bentheim	1653	Guildhall Art Gallery	57	19
	Wooded hillside with a view of Bentheim Castle	1650s	Art Gallery of New South Wales	256.1991	22
	The Castle at Bentheim	1651	private collection		24
	Castle Bentheim	1653	private collection		25
	View of Burg Bentheim	1650s	Mauritshuis	1151	26
	Ruins of Brederode	1655	Philadelphia Museum of Art	Cat. 564	28
	Landscape with the Ruins of the Castle of Egmond	1655	Art Institute of Chicago	1947.475	29
	A View of Egmond aan Zee	1650	Kelvingrove Art Gallery and Museum	34	31
	Old elm tree with view of Egmond aan Zee	1648	Currier Museum of Art		32
	View of Egmond aan Zee	1650	Nationalmuseum	NM 618	34
	View of Haarlem from the Northwest, with the Bleaching Fields in the Foreground	1670s	Rijksmuseum	SK-A-351	35
	View of Haarlem from the Northwest	1668	Gemäldegalerie	885C	36
	Dunes and bleaching fields	1668	Gemäldegalerie	885E	37
	View of bleaching fields and Haarlem	1670	Mauritshuis	155	40
	A Bleaching Ground in a Hollow by a Cottage	1640s	National Gallery	NG44	43
	A Landscape with a Ruined Castle and a Church	1665	National Gallery	NG990	44
	An Extensive Landscape with Ruins	1665	National Gallery	NG2561	45
	View of the Plain of Haarlem with Bleaching Grounds	1660s	private collection		46
	Haarlem bleaching grounds	1670	Gosford House		48
	An Extensive Landscape with a View of Alkmaar	1670	Gosford House		49
	The Bleaching Grounds near Haarlem	1670	Montreal Museum of Fine Arts	1945.92	52
	View of Bleaching fields near Haarlem	1670	private collection		53
	View of the dunes near Bloemendaal with ruins in the foreground	1660s	private collection		58
	The Thicket near Haarlem	1653	Department of Paintings of the Louvre	INV 1819	60
	Bleaching Fields to the North-Northeast of Haarlem	1670s	Philadelphia Museum of Art	E1924-3-90	62
	View of Haarlem from the South with Bleaching fields	1667	Timken Museum of Art		64
	An extensive landscape with grain fields, Heemstede beyond	1660s	private collection		67
	View of Haarlem	1660s	Museum of Fine Arts	L-R 301.2017	68
	Dune Landscape near Haarlem	1647	private collection		69
	View of Haarlem with Bleaching Fields	1670	Kunsthaus Zürich		70
	A Ruined Castle Gateway	1660s	National Gallery	NG2562	71
	Ruins of the gate of Huis ter Kleef near Haarlem	1650s	private collection		72
	Kostverloren House on the Amstel	1660s	Amsterdam Museum	SA 38217	73
	View of Naarden and the church of Muiderberg	1647	Thyssen-Bornemisza Museum	354 (1930.99)	78
	Landscape with view of Ootmarsum	1650s	Alte Pinakothek	10818	79
	Cornelis de Graeff with his Wife and Sons	1660	National Gallery of Ireland	NGI.287	80
	The Windmill at Wijk bij Duurstede	1670	Rijksmuseum; Amsterdam Museum	SK-C-211; SA 8296	81
	The Cornfield	1660	Kunstmuseum Basel	924	82
	View of the Ruins of Huis ter Kleef and Haarlem	1660s	Musée Jacquemart-André		83
	Hilly Landscape	1652	Herzog Anton Ulrich Museum	376	84
	Extensive field landscape with a track and a church in the distance	1650	Gemäldegalerie Alte Meister	1503	86
	Country Road with Cornfields and Oak Tree	1660s	Uffizi	1201	87
	Sloping Field with Sheaves of Wheat	1655	private collection		88
	Cottage under Trees near a Grainfield	1653	private collection		89
	Hilly wheat field	1660	Palais des Beaux-Arts de Lille	P 224	94
	View of Grainfields with a Distant Town	1660s	Los Angeles County Museum of Art	M.2009.106.12	97
	Landscape with a Wheatfield	1650s	J. Paul Getty Museum	83.PA.278	98
	Grainfields	1668	Metropolitan Museum of Art	32.100.14	100
	Wheat Fields	1670	Metropolitan Museum of Art	14.40.623	101
	A Cornfield, in the Background the Zuiderzee	1650s	Museum Boijmans Van Beuningen	1742 (OK)	106
	Landscape with watermill	1661	Rijksmuseum; Amsterdam Museum	SK-C-213; SA 8298	110
	A Water Mill	1655	private collection		111
	Hilly Landscape with a Watermill, ca. 1670	1670	Detroit Institute of Arts	49.532	113
	Landscape with a Watermill	1680	Detroit Institute of Arts	F82.94	114
	Two Undershot Watermills with Men Opening a Sluice	1650s	private collection		115
	Watermill	1660s	Rijksdienst voor het Cultureel Erfgoed	NK1773	116
	Two Watermills and an Open Sluice near Singraven	1650	National Gallery	NG986	117
	Three Watermills with Washerwomen	1660s	National Gallery	NG989	118
	Two Watermills and an Open Sluice	1653	J. Paul Getty Museum	82.PA.18	119
	The watermill	1660	National Gallery of Victoria	1249-3	120
	Water mill near a farm	1660	Museum Boijmans Van Beuningen	2520 (OK)	121
	Two Mills	1650s	Musée des Beaux-Arts de Strasbourg	MBA 265	122
	The Watermill at the Edge of the Wood	1650s	private collection		124
	Landscape with a Windmill	1646	Cleveland Museum of Art	1967.19	127
	Landscape with a Farm House and Windmill	1680	Detroit Institute of Arts	53.352	129
	Landscape with a Windmill in the Evening	1650	Royal Collection	RCIN 405538	130
	Landscape with Windmills near Haarlem	1651	Dulwich Picture Gallery	DPG168	131
	Landscape with a Windmill near a Town Moat	1650s	private collection		133
	Landscape with a Cottage and a Windmill	1646	private collection		135
	Landscape with a windmill by a river	1655	private collection		137
	Landscape with Waterfall	1668	Rijksmuseum; Amsterdam Museum	SK-C-210; SA 8297	138
	Mountainous landscape with waterfall	1660s	Rijksmuseum; Amsterdam Museum	SK-A-348; SB 5813	139
	Rocky landscape	1660s	Rijksmuseum; Amsterdam Museum	SK-C-212; SA 8299	140
	Landscape with waterfall and wooden footbridge	1660s	private collection		142
	Waterfall in Norway	1660s	Royal Museum of Fine Arts Antwerp (KMSKA)	713	144
	Low Waterfall in a Hilly Landscape with a Thatched Cottage	1670	private collection		145
	Waterfall at sunset	1660s	Gemäldegalerie	899A	150
	A wooded river landscape with a waterfall and travellers on a bridge	1660s	private collection		153
	A wooded landscape with a waterfall	1660s	private collection		154
	Waterfall with Castle Built on the Rock	1660s	Herzog Anton Ulrich Museum	378	157
	Landscape with waterfall and pine trees	1660s	private collection		160
	Landscape with waterfall	1660	Fitzwilliam Museum	63	164
	Landscape with river and pines	1660	Fitzwilliam Museum	75	165
	Waterfall with a Half-Timbered House and Castle	1665	Fogg Museum	1953.2	166
	Waterfall with mountain top castle and cottage	1668	Museumslandschaft Hessen Kassel		167
	Landscape with a Waterfall near a Castle	1670s	private collection		168
	Landscape with a Church by a Torrent	1670	Cleveland Museum of Art	1962.256	170
	A Waterfall with church and trees	1668	Wallraf-Richartz Museum		172
	Landscape with a Waterfall and a Hut	1660s	Statens Museum for Kunst	KMSsp570; 299	174
	Rocky Landscape with Castle and Cascade	1670s	Dayton Art Institute private collection Art Institute of Chicago	53.1; 94.1050	177
	The Jewish Cemetery	1660	Detroit Institute of Arts	26.3	178
	The Jewish Cemetery	1653	Gemäldegalerie Alte Meister	1502	180
	The Waterfall before the Mountain Castle	1670s	Gemäldegalerie Alte Meister	Gal.-Nr. 1495	181
	A waterfall with a wooden bridge	1670	Gemäldegalerie Alte Meister	Gal.-Nr. 1497	182
	The Waterfall in front of the Wooded Slope	1670s	Gemäldegalerie Alte Meister	1498	183
	Waterfall with Pine tree	1660s	Gemäldegalerie Alte Meister	Gal.-Nr. 1501	184
	A Scandinavian Landscape with a Watermill	1660s	private collection		186
	Landscape with a Waterfall	1670s	Uffizi	8436	188
	Hilly wooded landscape with a half-timbered house by a water fall	1655	Städel	754	189
	Wooded landscape with a water fall	1660s	Städel	1156	190
	Bosky landscape with a large oak and two fallen beeches by a waterfall	1660s	private collection		191
	A waterfall	1660	Suermondt-Ludwig-Museum		192
	Mountainous landscape with waterfall	1660s	private collection		195
	Mountain Landscape with Waterfall	1650s	Mauritshuis	153	197
	Wooded river landscape with a waterfall, a shepherd with his flock and houses beyond	1660	Rijksdienst voor het Cultureel Erfgoed	NK2455	198
	Wooded mountainous landscape with fishermen and resting travellers near a waterfall	1660s	Museum De Lakenhal	NK2497	200
	A Mountain Landscape with a Chapel	1655	Kunsthalle Hamburg	HK-144	202
	Landscape with Cascade	1670s	Indianapolis Museum of Art	44.54	205
	Wooded Landscape with Waterfall	1668	North Carolina Museum of Art	52.9.56	209
	A Waterfall	1670	Dulwich Picture Gallery	DPG105	212
	A Waterfall in a Rocky Landscape	1660	National Gallery	NG627	213
	A Landscape with a Waterfall and a Castle on a Hill	1660s	National Gallery	NG737	214
	A Waterfall at the Foot of a Hill, near a Village	1660s	National Gallery	NG855	215
	A Torrent in a Mountainous Landscape	1660s	National Gallery	NG987	216
	Landscape with Waterfall	1660s	The Wallace Collection	P56	218
	Castle on a Mountain with a Waterfall and Pine trees	1660s	Museum of Fine Arts of Lyon	A4478	226
	Mountainous landscape with a waterfall, a cottage, and a castle	1660s	private collection		227
	A Rocky River Landscape with a Waterfall	1670	private collection		229
	Paysage avec une cascade	1655	Musée Fabre	825.1.191	231
	Waterfall in an Oak Forest	1660s	Musée Fabre	836.4.54	232
	Torrent with Oak Trees	1660s	Alte Pinakothek	1038	236
	The Forest Stream	1660s	Metropolitan Museum of Art	89.15.4	241
	Mountain Torrent	1670s	Metropolitan Museum of Art	25.110.18	242
	Hilly wooded landscape with a waterfall	1655	private collection		243
	Mountainous landscape with a torrent and church	1670	private collection		246
	A Waterfall with village, footbridge and pine trees	1660s	National Gallery of Canada	5878	249
	Landscape with a Waterfall	1655	Ashmolean Museum	WA1962.17.24	250
	Hilly Landscape with a Fisherman at a Waterfall	1679	private collection		253
	Waterfall (Petworth)	1660s	Petworth House; National Trust	NT 486803	257
	Landscape with a Waterfall	1660s	Philadelphia Museum of Art	W1895-1-8	259
	Mountain Landscape with River	1660s	Rhode Island School of Design Museum	48.453	263
	Landscape with Waterfall (St. Louis)	1665	Saint Louis Art Museum	44:1974	269
	Waterfall in a hilly landscape	1660s	Hermitage Museum	ГЭ-942	270
	Norwegian Landscape with Waterfall	1665	Residenzgalerie	425	273
	Forest landscape with pond	1670s	Rijksdienst voor het Cultureel Erfgoed	NK1650	274
	Hilly Landscape with a Broad Waterfall	1670	Staatliches Museum Schwerin	107	276
	Waterfall in a Mountainous Landscape with a Ruined Castle	1666	private collection		277
	Bebost rivier landschap met rustende familie	1670s	private collection		279
	A wooded landscape with a waterfall	1675	private collection		281
	Wooded Landscape with a Shepherd and Low Waterfall	1670s	private collection		282
	Norwegian Landscape with Waterfall	1670s	private collection		284
	Landscape with Waterfall	1670s	National Trust	1422018	285
	Mountain Landscape with Waterfall	1670s	Kunsthistorisches Museum	GG_449	287
	A river landscape with fir trees by a cascade	1650	private collection		290
	Mountainous landscape with a torrent	1670s	private collection		291
	Wooded River Landscape with Bridge	1650s	private collection		292
	Forest Scene	1655	National Gallery of Art	1942.9.80	295
	Landscape	1670	National Gallery of Art	1961.9.85	296
	Waterfall with ruins and a village in the distance	1670s	Museum Kunsthaus Heylshof	G 53	299
	Mountainous landscape with a torrent	1660s	private collection		301
	Forest scene	1653	Rijksmuseum	SK-A-350	307
	Oaks at a lake with Water Lilies	1650s	Gemäldegalerie	885G	315
	A Wooded Landscape	1662	Barber Institute of Fine Arts	38.11	321
	Woodland Vistas	1660s	Museum of Fine Arts	52.1757	323
	Blasted Oak near a Pond	1647	Museum of Fine Arts, Budapest	263	325
	Oak Trees by a Pond	1649	Statens Museum for Kunst	KMSsp572	332
	Oak Trees near a Road, Evening	1660	Statens Museum for Kunst	KMS372	333
	Stag Hunt in a Wood with a Marsh	1660s	Gemäldegalerie Alte Meister	1492	338
	A road through a wood	1660	Gemäldegalerie Alte Meister	Gal.-Nr. 1500	339
	A Wood Scene	1649	University of Edinburgh Art Collection	EU0733	341
	Wooded landscape with a stream, pool, shepherd and shepherdess	1658	private collection		342
	Wooded landscape with cattle crossing a stream	1650	private collection		344
	Wooded Landscape with Figures on a Path	1660	Musée départemental d'Art ancien et contemporain	L.I.58	345
	Wooded landscape with swans in a pond	1660s	Städel	941	346
	Road through a Wooded Landscape at Twilight	1648	Mauritshuis	728	352
	View of a Forest	1646	Museum Boijmans Van Beuningen	NK2447; 3193 (OK)	353
	Landscape with Wooded Hill	1654	Kunsthalle Hamburg	HK-153	355
	Wooded Landscape	1660s	Hofje van Mevrouw van Aerden	Br.L8	369
	Landscape by Morning Light	1648	Museum der bildenden Künste	1056	370
	A Pool surrounded by Trees	1660s	National Gallery	NG854	372
	A Road winding between Trees towards a Distant Cottage	1660s	National Gallery	NG988	373
	Sunrise in a Wood	1670s	The Wallace Collection	P247	375
	A wooded river landscape with peasants on a bridge	1660s	private collection		376
	Landscape with Tall Trees	1660s	private collection		377
	Woodland landscape with figures by a river	1655	private collection		378
	The Great Oak	1652	Los Angeles County Museum of Art	M.91.164.1	380
	Entrance to a Forest	ca. 1660–1665	Musée des Beaux-Arts de Mulhouse	D 58.1.82	384
	Waldlandschaft mit Hasenjagd	1670s	Alte Pinakothek	872	385
	Wooded Landscape with Oncoming Storm	1660s	Alte Pinakothek	1053	387
	Wooded Landscape with a Pond and Shepherds	1650s	private collection		390
	A Woodland Pool	1665	Clowes collection		393
	Edge of a Forest with a Grainfield	1655	Kimbell Art Museum		394
	Rolling wooded landscape with cattle on a flooded road	1660s	private collection		395
	Wooded landscape with a flooded road	1650s	Department of Paintings of the Louvre	D.1955.2.1	397
	Lumbermen working in the woods	1660s	Department of Paintings of the Louvre	RF 710	399
	A hunter in a wooded landscape	1640s	private collection		402
	Landscape of a Forest with a Wooden Bridge	1670s	Philadelphia Museum of Art	E1924-3-77	409
	A Wood with a Stream	1650	National Gallery Prague	DO 4156	410
	A Wooded Marsh	c. 1665	Hermitage Museum	ГЭ-934	414
	Road at the Edge of the Forest	1647	Hermitage Museum	ГЭ-935	415
	Winter landscape with dead tree	1660s	Hermitage Museum	ГЭ-936	416
	The Gnarled Oak	1650s	Art, Design & Architecture Museum	1960.18	420
	Wooded landscape with travellers on a track by a river	1659	private collection		423
	Wooded Landscape with a Rocky Stream	1660	private collection		424
	Road through a Grove	1660s	Nationalmuseum	NM 616	425
	A Road through an Oak Wood	1660s	National Museum of Western Art	P.1980-0002	430
	The Large Forest	1650s	Kunsthistorisches Museum	GG_426	437
	A wooded river landscape with a traveller and dog	1660s	private collection		440
	Wooded Landscape with a Pond	1650	private collection		441
	The Cottage under the Tree	1655	private collection		448
	A Road on the Slope of a Hill	1680	Gemäldegalerie	884C	457
	Rolling landscape with an oak before a grainfield	1650s	private collection		459
	A hill with an oak wood and a little waterfall	1660s	Gemäldegalerie Alte Meister	Gal.-Nr. 1499	465
	A Rocky Landscape with Great Oaks	1660s	Museum der bildenden Künste	G 1584	471
	The Ray of Light	1665	Department of Paintings of the Louvre	INV 1820	474
	Three Great Trees in a Mountainous Landscape with a River	1660s	Norton Simon Museum	F.1971.2.P	475
	Mountainous Landscape	1670s	Hermitage Museum	ГЭ-932	476
	Hilly Wooded Landscape with Castle	1650s	Duke of Buccleuch collection		477
	Wooded River Landscape	1650s	Eijk and Rose-Marie van Otterloo Collection		479
	Hilly Wooded Landscape with a Falconer and a Horseman	1653	private collection		481
	Landscape with Houses on a Rocky Hill with a View of a Plain Beyond	1650s	private collection		482
	Wooded River Bank	1650s	Gemäldegalerie	885H	491
	River Landscape with a Castle on a High Cliff	1670s	Cincinnati Art Museum	1946.98	494
	The Banks of a River	1649	National Galleries of Scotland	NGL 033.84	496
	Landscape with Sluice	1647	Rijksmuseum Twenthe	433	497
	A Cottage and a Hayrick by a River	1648	National Gallery	NG2565	503
	Bridge with a Sluice	1648	J. Paul Getty Museum	86.PB.597	505
	A Wooded Landscape with Travellers on a Track by a Pool	1649	private collection		510
	Landscape with a Footbridge	1652	Frick Collection	1949.1.156	511
	Sandbank	1647	Nivaagaard	0049NMK	513
	Landscape with a cottage and stone bridge under a cloudy sky	1650	private collection		515
	Stone Bridge	1648	Philadelphia Museum of Art	Cat. 570	517
	Landscape with a Sluice Gate	1660s	Toledo Museum of Art	1978.68	519
	River Landscape with an Angler	1650	private collection		521
	Landscape with river and cellar entrance	1649	Kunsthistorisches Museum	GG_9807	522
	The Cloister	1650s	Gemäldegalerie Alte Meister	884b	532
	The Monastery	1652	Gemäldegalerie Alte Meister	Gal.-Nr. 1494	535
	River landscape with church	1660s	Calouste Gulbenkian museum	398	538
	Ruins in a Dune Landscape	1660s	National Gallery	NG746	539
	A Landscape with a Ruined Building	1660s	National Gallery	NG991	540
	Road in the Dunes	1648	Frans Hals Museum	os 2002-62	551
	Landscape	1649	Royal Museum of Fine Arts Antwerp (KMSKA)	320	553
	Village at the Wood's Edge	1651	Gemäldegalerie	885F	555
	Travellers and shepherds at a crossroads near a dead tree	1650s	Royal Museums of Fine Arts of Belgium	1177	558
	View of a Cottage on a Hill	1660s	Wallraf-Richartz Museum	WRM 1008	561
	Landscape, ca. 1646	1646	Detroit Institute of Arts	F67.4	562
	Landscape with a Cottage and Trees	1646	Kunsthalle Hamburg	159	569
	Landscape with a Village	1652	The Wallace Collection	P156	572
	Landscape with a Half-Timbered House and a Blasted Tree	1653	Speed Art Museum	1998.3	577
	Farm	1650s	Hermitage Museum	ГЭ-941	584
	A wooded landscape with a traveller resting on a path	1649	private collection		586
	Country House in a Park	1670s	National Gallery of Art	1960.2.1	588
	Landscape with Thatched Cottages and Thicket	1665	Schloss Weimar	G 90	589
	Sandy Track in the Dunes	1650	Rijksmuseum; Amsterdam Museum	SK-C-562; SA 7397	592
	Landscape with ruins	1682	Rijksmuseum	SK-A-3343	593
	Landscape with a Blasted Tree near a House	1645	Fitzwilliam Museum	84	595
	A Landscape with Two Figures on a Rise and a Stream at Right	1647	private collection		597
	Dune Landscape with Fence, ca. 1647	1647	Städel Museum	1240	598
	Dune Landscape with a Rabbit Hunt	1650s	Frans Hals Museum	os I-299	600
	Wooded Dune Landscape	1648	private collection		601
	Dune Landscape in Evening Light with a Man Driving an Ass	1647	Museum der bildenden Künste	1055	602
	A wooded landscape with an oak tree, pond and houses beyond	1650	private collection		603
	Landscape with dead tree and an oncoming storm	1649	Musée Fabre	836-4-53	605
	Road in the Dunes	1647	Alte Pinakothek	544	607
	Landscape with cottages	1670s	private collection		608
	Landscape with a Village in the Distance	1646	Metropolitan Museum of Art	65.181.10	609
	Peasant Cottage in a Landscape	1646	Hermitage Museum	ГЭ-939	610
	Dunes	1650s	Philadelphia Museum of Art	Cat. 563	612
	Storm on the Dunes	1648	Philadelphia Museum of Art	Cat. 567	613
	Landscape with some houses and a sand track	1647	Hermitage Museum	ГЭ-933	616
	Landscape with a Traveller	1650	Hermitage Museum	ГЭ-938	617
	Winter Landscape with a Dead Tree	1660s	Hermitage Museum	ГЭ-1879	618
	Landscape with Dune and Small Waterfall	1650s	National Museum of Western Art	P.1969-0002	620
	Beach and Dunes at Scheveningen	1660s	Condé Museum	PE 138	628
	The Shore at Egmond aan Zee	1675	National Gallery	NG1390	631
	The Zuiderzee Coast near Muiden	1670s	Polesden Lacey	1246494	632
	Seashore	1676	Hermitage Museum	ГЭ-5616	633
	View from the Dunes to the Sea	1650s	Kunsthaus Zürich	R 31	634
	Dunes by the Sea	1648	private collection		635
	Rough Sea	1675	Museum of Fine Arts	57.4	640
	Rough Sea at a Jetty	1650s	Kimbell Art Museum	AP 1989.01	644
	Ships in Stormy Seas	1655	Instituut Collectie Nederland; Stichting Nederlands Kunstbezit; Rijksmuseum	2268; SK-C-1633; NK3274	646
	View from the Coast of Norway	1660s	Calouste Gulbenkian museum	120	648
	Vessels in a fresh breeze	1660s	National Gallery	NG2567	649
	Stormy Sea with Sailing Vessels	1660s	Thyssen-Bornemisza Museum	359 (1957.2)	650
	Ships in stormy weather off the coast	1650s	Department of Paintings of the Louvre	INV 1818	653
	Rough Sea	1670s	Musée des Beaux-Arts de Strasbourg	MBA 571	654a
	Boats on a Stormy Sea	1670s	Philadelphia Museum of Art	E1924-3-56	655
	Stormy Sea	1650s	Nationalmuseum	NM 4033	657
	Sailing vessels in a stormy sea near a rocky coast	1655	private collection		658
	View of the IJ on a Stormy Day	1662	Worcester Art Museum	1940.52	659
	Sailing Vessels in a Choppy Sea	1665	private collection		660
	Winter Landscape	1665	Rijksmuseum	SK-A-349	662
	A winter landscape with peasants on a road and skaters on a frozen river, a cottage nearby	1660s	private collection		666
	Winter Landscape with a View on a Town, Probably Doesburg	1675	private collection		667
	Winter landscape with a snow covered tree group	1670s	Städel	535	669
	Winter Landscape near Haarlem	1670s	Städel	1109	670
	Winter landscape with a harbour	1660s	Mauritshuis	802	673
	Winter Landscape with Houses and Frozen Canal	1660s	Kunsthalle Hamburg	HK-154	674
	Winter Landscape with a View of the River Amstel and Amsterdam in the Distance	1660s	private collection		676
	Winter Landscape with a Watermill	1660s	private collection		678
	Winter Landscape with Wooden House	1670	Alfred Bader Fine Arts		682
	Winter landscape with windmill and a house in scaffolding	1670s	private collection		683
	A Village in Winter	1665	Alte Pinakothek	117	684
	Winter Landscape with a windmill	1670s	Fondation Custodia	6104	686
	Winter Landscape with the Ruins of Brederode	1665	private collection		687
	Winter Landscape	1660s	Philadelphia Museum of Art	Cat. 569	688
	Winter Landscape	1670	Museum Boijmans Van Beuningen	1745 (OK)	689
	Winter Landscape with Two Windmills	1670s	Eijk and Rose-Marie van Otterloo Collection		694

== Sources ==
- Jacob van Ruisdael, Exhibition catalog Mauritshuis and Fogg Art Museum, by Seymour Slive, Hendrik Richard Hoetink, Mark Greenberg, Meulenhoff/Landshoff, 1981
- Jacob van Ruisdael, catalog raisonné by E. John Walford, Yale University Press, 1991
- Jacob van Ruisdael: A Complete Catalogue of His Paintings, Drawings, and Etchings, a catalog raisonné with +/- 700 paintings, 130+ drawings, and 13 etchings by Seymour Slive, Yale University Press, New Haven, CT, 2001
- Jacob van Ruisdael: Master of Landscape, Exhibition catalog Los Angeles County Museum of Art, Philadelphia Museum of Art, and Royal Academy of Arts, London, by Seymour Slive, 2005-2006
- Jacob van Ruisdael in the RKD
