= Panoramic view of the Amstel looking toward Amsterdam =

Painting by Jacob van Ruisdael (c. 1671–1681)

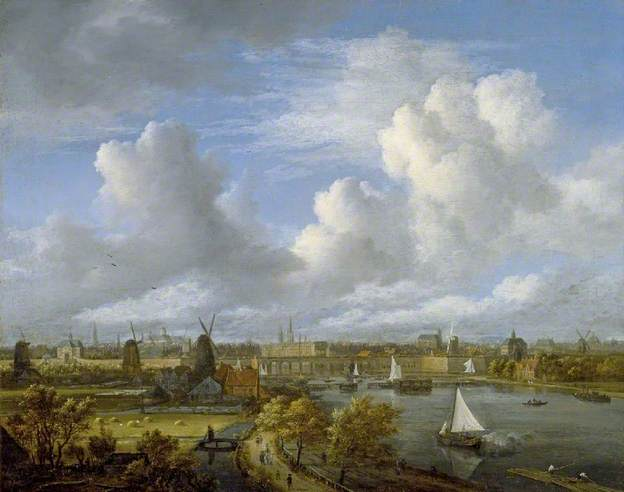
Panoramic view of the Amstel looking toward Amsterdam by Jacob van Ruisdael

Panoramic view of the Amstel looking toward Amsterdam is a 17th-century oil on canvas painting by the Dutch Golden Age painter Jacob van Ruisdael. It is in the collection of the Fitzwilliam Museum in Cambridge.

The painting is catalogue number 10 in the 1911 catalogue raisonné by art historian Hofstede de Groot. He wrote "The river fills much of the right-hand side of the picture. In the centre is a road with several figures; on the river are a raft of timber and a small vessel, from which a gun is being fired. On the left are three windmills, houses, and a bleaching-ground. The town, with its many churches and public buildings, extends in the background. One may distinguish the Westerkerk, the town-hall, the Zuiderkerk, and Oude Kerk, as well as the great synagogue. The blockhouses are not shown." The painting is catalogue number 3 in Seymour Slive's 2001 catalogue raisonné of Ruisdael. It is object number 74 in the collection of the Fitzwilliam Museum.

Its dimensions are 52.1 cm x 66.1 cm. It is signed in the lower left. Based on the presence of certain buildings Slive estimated that the undated painting was made between 1671 and 1681. Ruisdael lived in Amsterdam at that time.

The drawing that served as a preliminary study for this painting, and a similar one that is in the Philips-de Jongh Collection, is at Leipzig.

== See also ==
- List of paintings by Jacob van Ruisdael
