= Landscape with a Cottage and Trees =

1646 painting by Jacob van Ruisdael

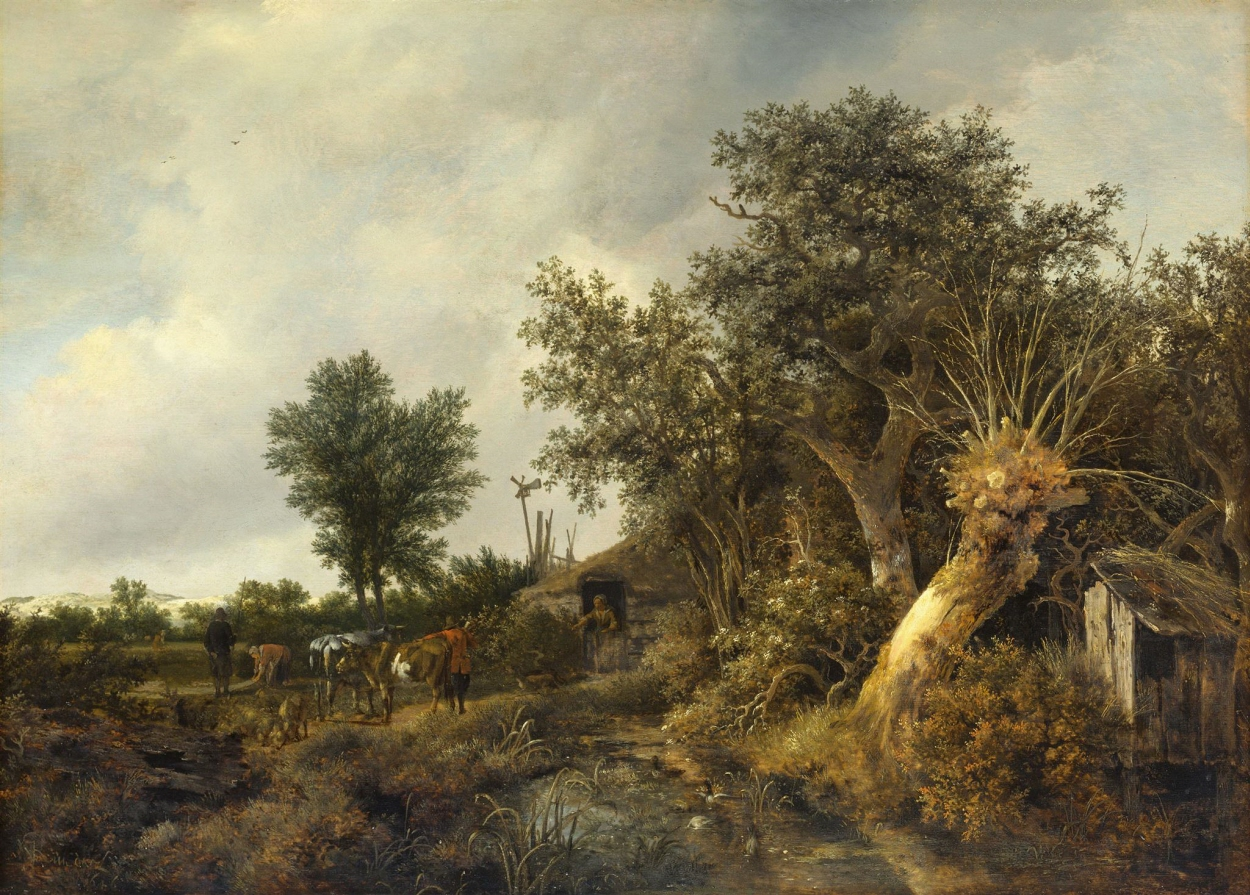
Landscape with a Cottage and Trees

Landscape with a Cottage and Trees (1646) is an oil-on-panel painting by the Dutch Golden Age painter Jacob van Ruisdael. It is in the collection of the Kunsthalle in Hamburg.

The painting shows a landscape near the dunes, with a modest cottage and a derelict shed, amidst dense vegetation. The people do not take centre stage; nature does.

This painting was documented by Hofstede de Groot in 1911, who wrote; "806. LANDSCAPE WITH A COTTAGE. In front of the cottage is a herdsman with cows, pigs, and other animals. To the right is a tree stripped of its bark. On a sheet of water near it are ducks. Sunlight falls on the trees in the left distance. The figures, which are highly finished and prominent, are by Berchem. Signed in full, and dated 1646; panel, 281/2 inches by 44 inches. In the collection of J. Amsinck, Hamburg, bequeathed to the Kunsthalle, 1879."

This work is one of the earliest known Ruisdaels. He was only a teenager when he created it. Art historian Seymour Slive attributes the staffage to the hand of Ruisdael himself, though Hofstede de Groot attributed the staffage to the hand of Nicolaes Berchem. The painting is catalogue number 569 in Slive's 2001 catalogue raisonne of Ruisdael.

== See also ==
- List of paintings by Jacob van Ruisdael
