= Two Water Mills with an Open Sluice =

1653 painting by Jacob van Ruisdael

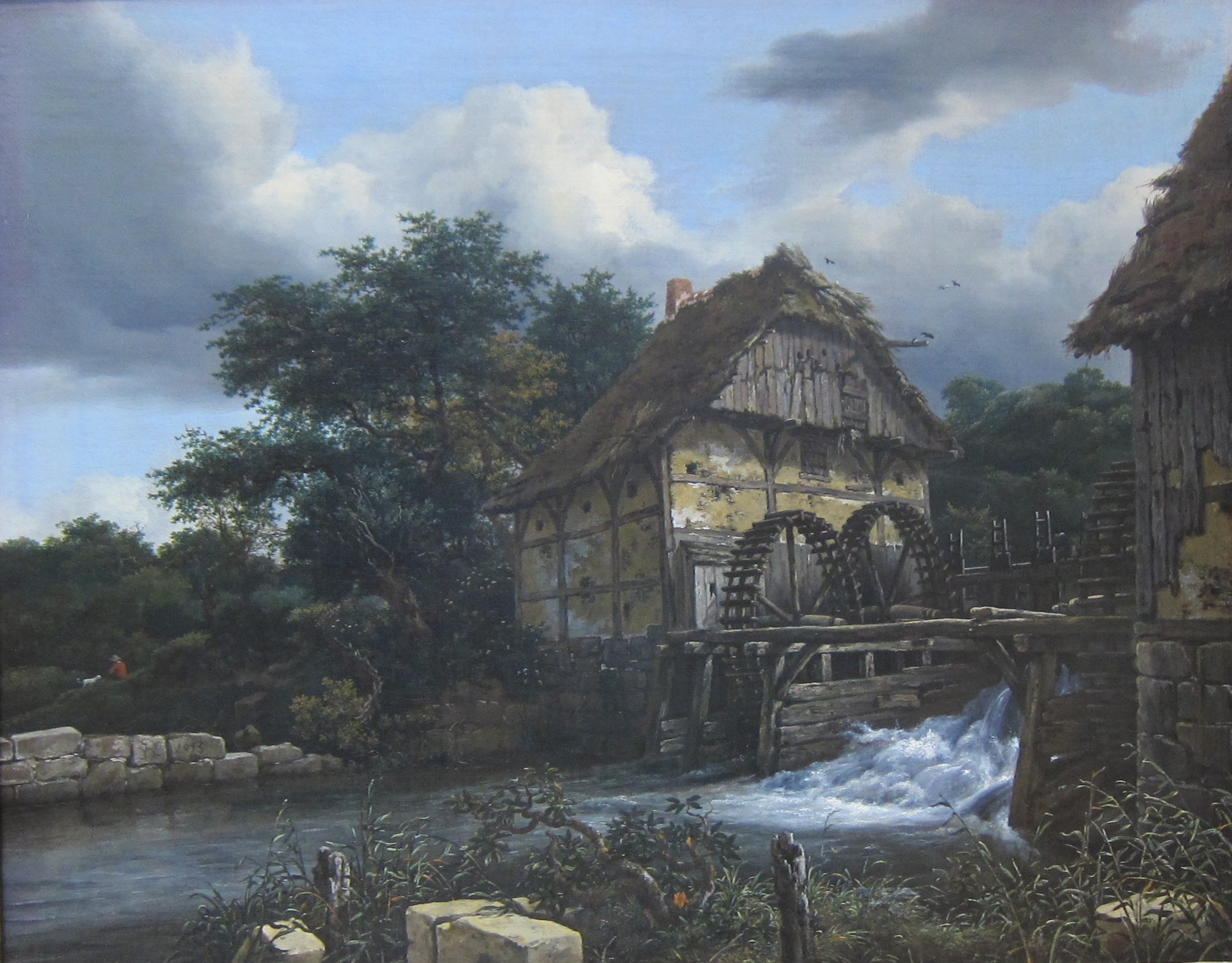
Two Water Mills with an Open Sluice

Two Water Mills with an Open Sluice, also known as Two Watermills and an Open Sluice, Two Undershot Water Mills with an Open Sluice is a 1653 painting by the Dutch Golden Age painter Jacob van Ruisdael. It is in the collection of the Getty Museum in Los Angeles.

The painting shows two working undershot water mills, with the major one being half-timbered with a cob-facade construction, tie beams, and vertical plank gable. This is characteristic of the water mills in the Bentheim area in Germany, to where Ruisdael had travelled in the early 1650s. This painting is one of six known variations on this theme and the only one that is dated.

Although other Western artists had depicted water mills before, Ruisdael was the first to make it the focal subject in a painting. Meindert Hobbema, Ruisdael's pupil, started working on the water mills subject in the 1660s. Today Hobbema is more strongly associated with water mills than his teacher.

The painting is known by various names. The painting is called Two Water Mills with an Open Sluice in Seymour Slive's 2001 catalogue raisonné of Ruisdael, catalogue number 119. In his 2011 book on Ruisdael's mills and water mills Slive calls it Two Undershot Water Mills with an Open Sluice. The Getty Museum calls it Two Watermills and an Open Sluice on their website, object number 82.PA.18.

== See also ==
- List of paintings by Jacob van Ruisdael
