= Winter Landscape near Haarlem =

Painting by Jacob van Ruisdael

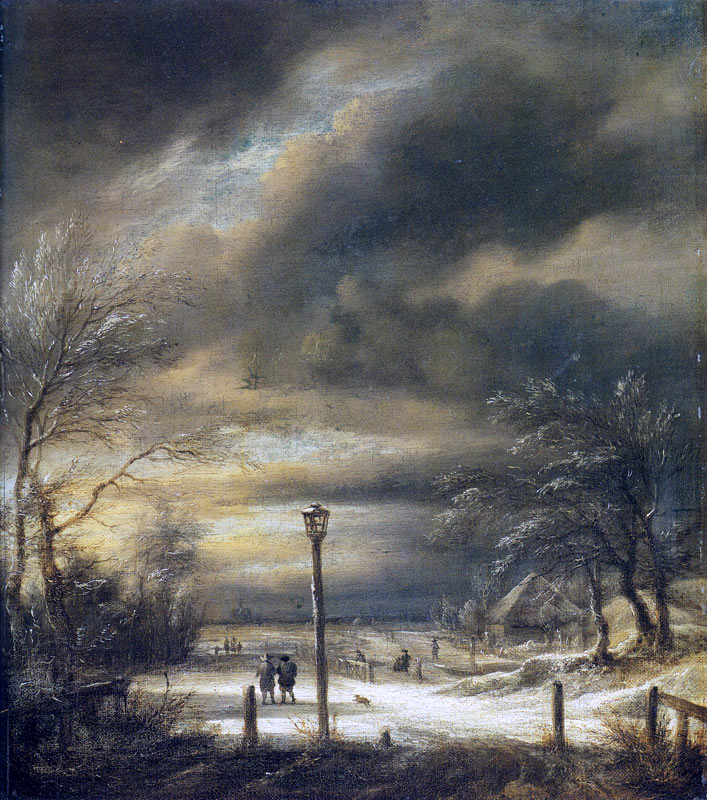
- Artist: Jacob van Ruisdael
- Year: 1670s
- Dimensions: 36.2 cm × 31.2 cm (14.3 in × 12.3 in)
- Location: Städel, Frankfurt

Winter Landscape near Haarlem (c. 1670s) is an oil on canvas painting by the Dutch landscape painter Jacob van Ruisdael. It is an example of Dutch Golden Age painting and is now in the collection of the Städel. This painting was documented by Hofstede de Groot in 1911, who wrote; "992. A WINTER LANDSCAPE. A snow-bound plain with trees to right and left. In the centre a road leads to the distance; away to the right is a cottage. In the centre foreground stands a solitary lamp-post. To the left of this are two travellers with a dog. Signed in full, according to the Sedelmeyer sale-catalogue, but the Frankfort catalogue does not mention a signature; canvas, 14 1/2 inches by 12 1/2 inches. Exhibited at Vienna, 1873, No. 165.

Sales. C. Sedelmeyer, Vienna, December 20, 1872, No. 144. Lippmann von Lissingen of Vienna, Paris, March 16, 1876, No. 38; bought for the Institute by the Frankfort Art Union. In the Stadel'sches Kunstinstitut, Frankfort -on -Main, 1900 catalogue, No. 272."

This scene is very similar to other paintings Ruisdael made in this period and these often served as inspiration for later painters of winter landscape.

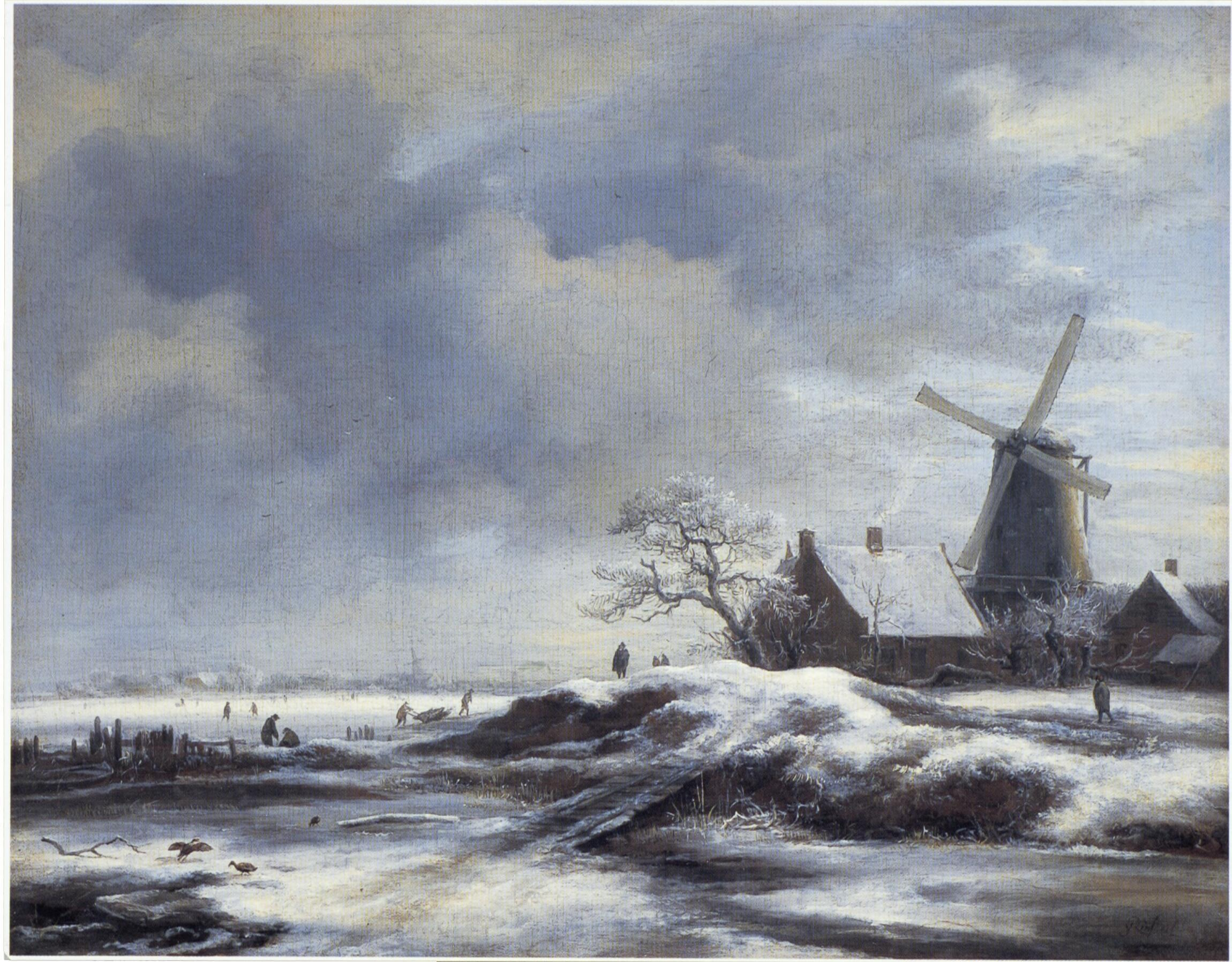
Fondation Custodia.

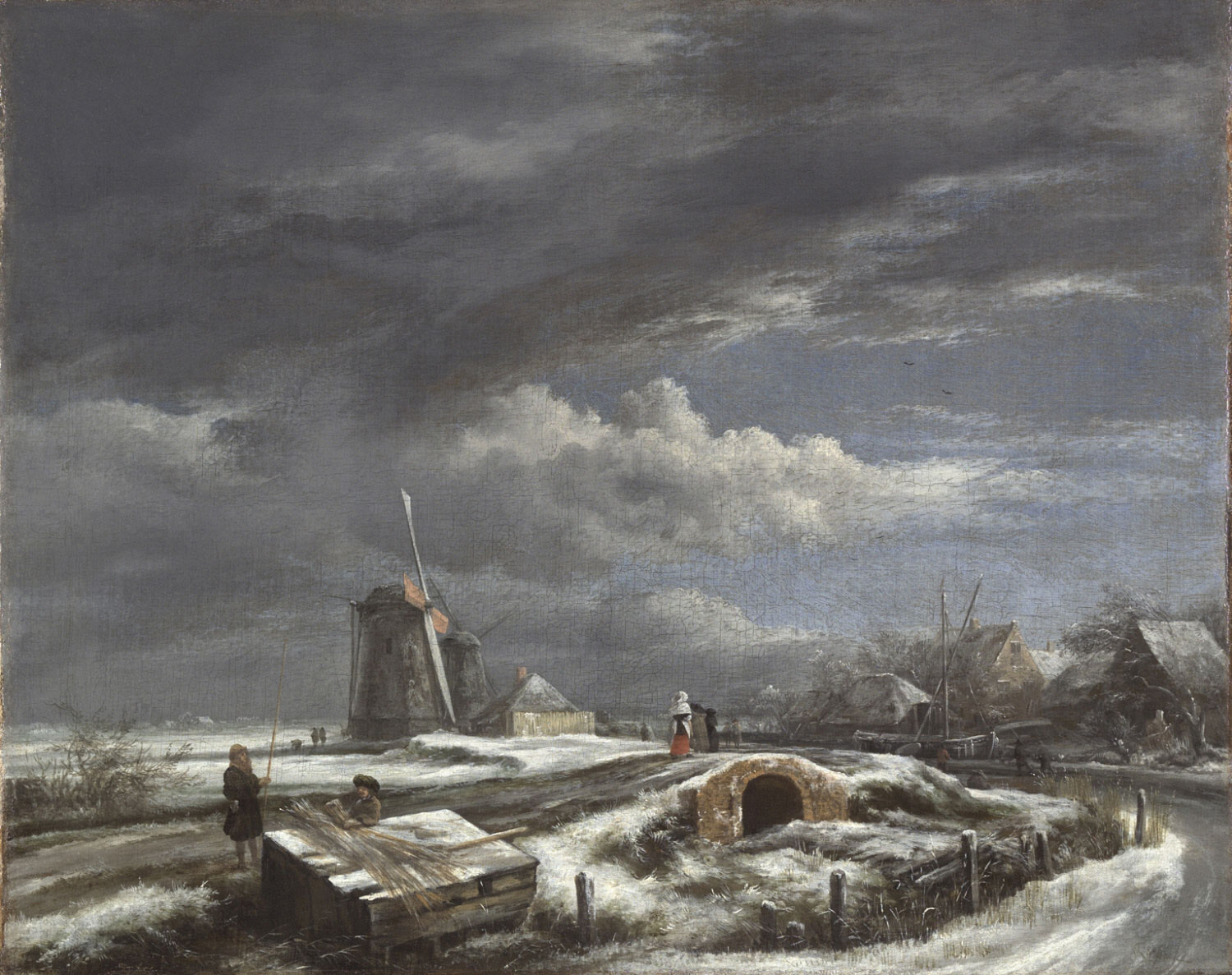
Philadelphia Museum of Art.

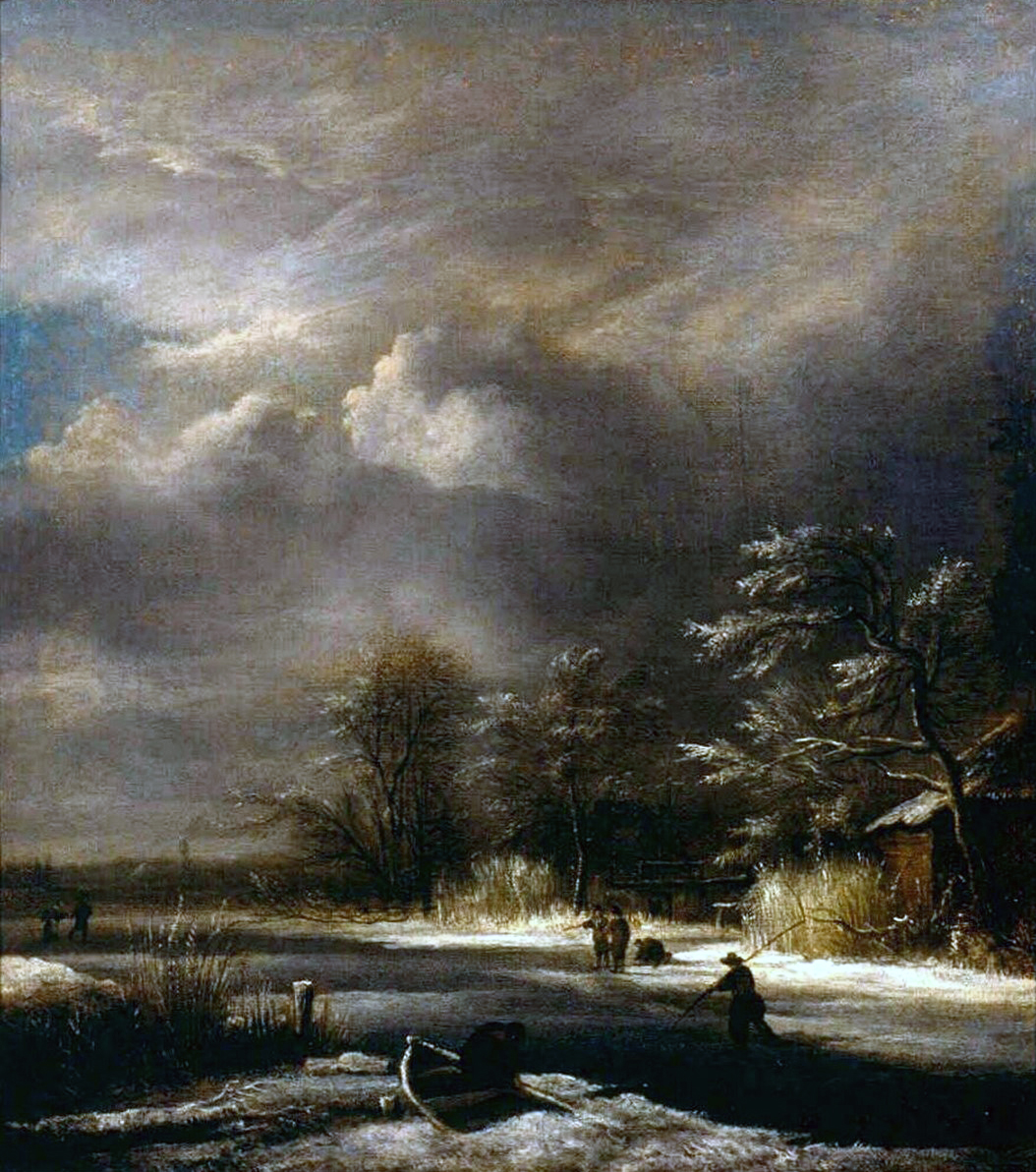
Museum Boijmans van Beuningen.

The lamp post in the painting has been identified as the invention of Jan van der Heyden which is the reason the painting can be dated to after 1670. Such lamp posts appear in other Ruisdael paintings.

== See also ==
- List of paintings by Jacob van Ruisdael
