= Mountain Landscape with a Watermill =

Painting by Jacob van Ruisdael

Mountainous Landscape
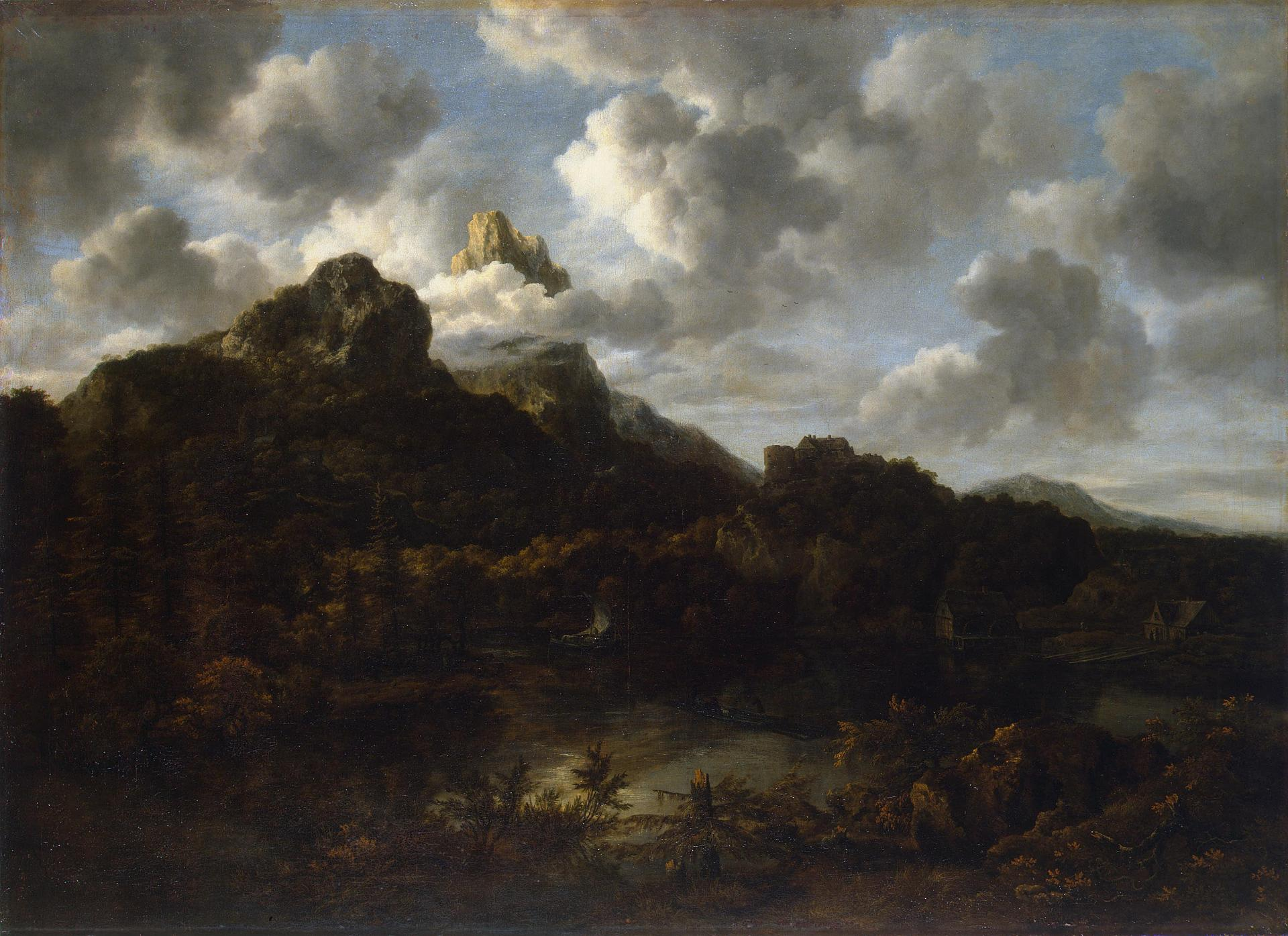
- Artist: Jacob van Ruisdael
- Year: c. 1675-1679
- Type: landscape painting
- Medium: oil on canvas
- Dimensions: 99.5 cm × 137 cm (39.2 in × 54 in)
- Location: Hermitage; Saint Petersburg
- Website: Hermitage online

Mountainous Landscape (c. 1675-1679) is an oil on canvas painting by the Dutch landscape painter Jacob van Ruisdael. It is an example of Dutch Golden Age painting and is now in the collection of the Hermitage, in Saint Petersburg.

This painting was documented by Hofstede de Groot in 1911, who wrote; "155. A WATER-MILL IN A NORWEGIAN LANDSCAPE. Sm. 307. A dark rocky landscape is intersected by a river, on which are a raft of timber and a small sailing boat. To the right, on the farther bank, are a cottage, a pile of timber, and a mill. Near the centre is a castle on a rocky hill. Farther to the left in the distance is a lofty conical hill, the top of which is hidden in a cloud. One of Ruisdael's most important pictures. Probably an evening effect, but very much darkened by time. Attributed in the 1838 catalogue to Salomon van Ruisdael. Canvas, 40 inches by 43 inches. Engraved by P. E. Moitte in the Brühl collection. In the collection of Count Brühl. In the Hermitage Palace, St. Petersburg, 1901 catalogue, No. 1147; it was there in 1835 (Sm., who valued it at £300)."

This scene is very similar to other paintings Ruisdael made in this period and these often served as inspiration for later painters of landscape.

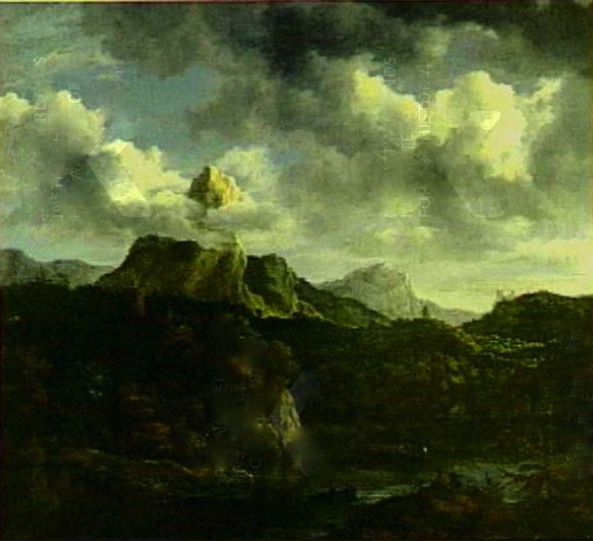
Michaelis collection.

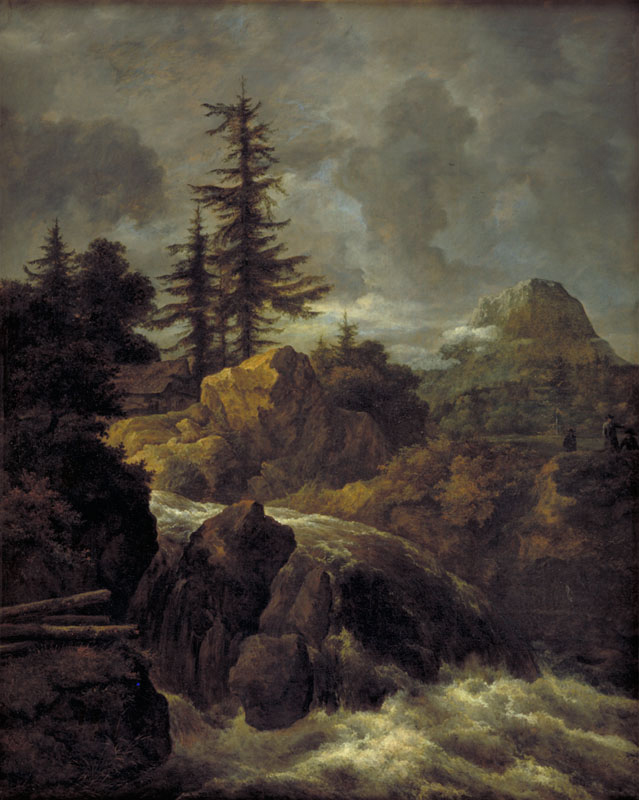
Statens Museum for Kunst.

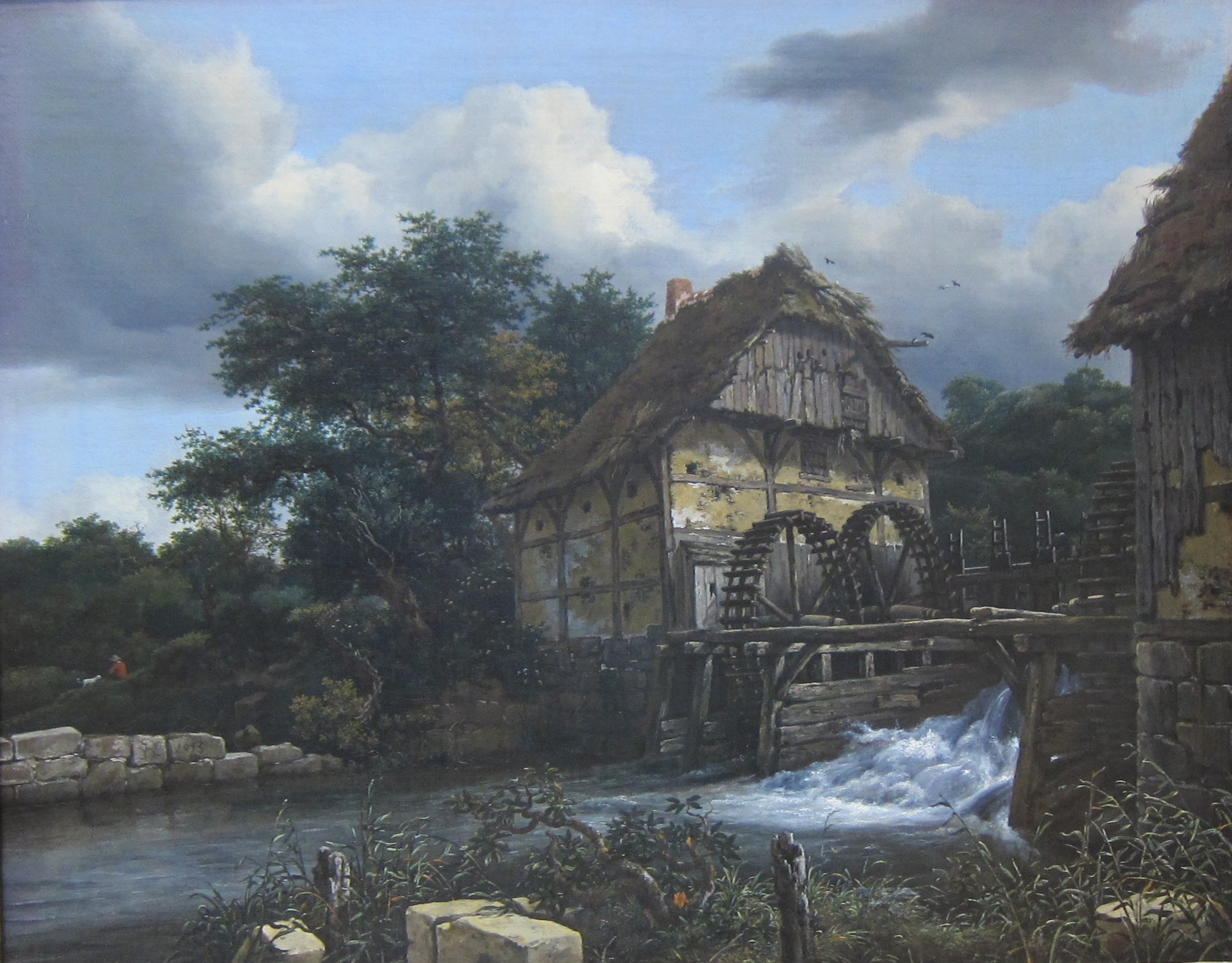
Getty Center.

== See also ==
- List of paintings by Jacob van Ruisdael
