= Bentheim Castle (painting) =

1653 painting by Jacob van Ruisdael

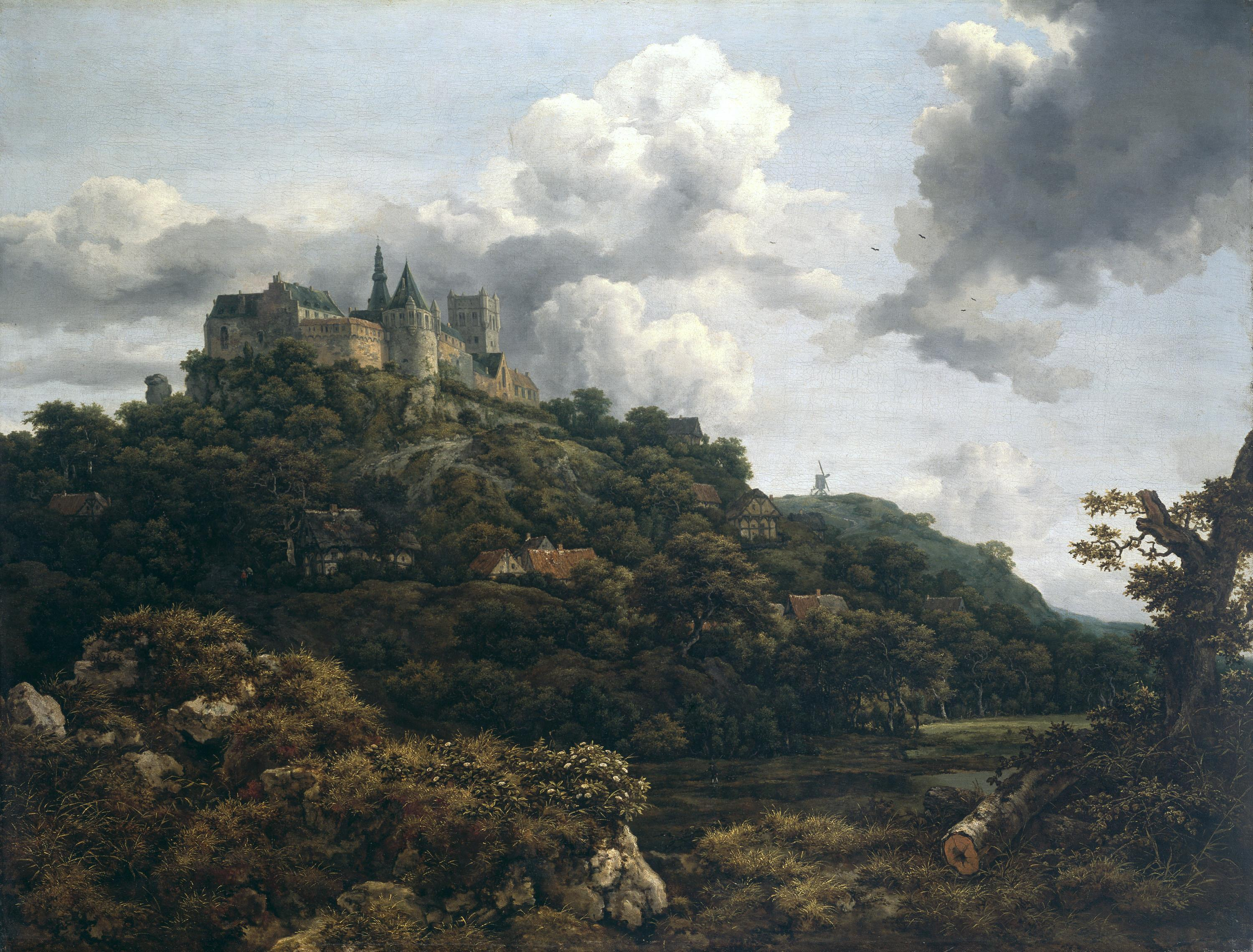
Bentheim Castle by Jacob van Ruisdael, 1653, from the National Gallery of Ireland in Dublin

Bentheim Castle (1653) is an oil on canvas painting by the Dutch Golden Age painter Jacob van Ruisdael. It is in the collection of the National Gallery of Ireland in Dublin.

This work is considered the most impressive of a dozen depictions Ruisdael made of Bentheim Castle. In the early 1650s he travelled with Nicolaes Berchem to Bentheim, in western Germany, just over the border. This work, called the Dublin version to distinguish it from the others, all with similar titles and all depicting the castle at various heights of hilltop, is significant in the series in that it puts the castle on top of a wooded mountain. In reality, the castle is on a low hill. These variations showcase Ruisdael's creative power. Despite the high realism of his landscapes, they are often compositions rather than exact copies of the real world.

The dimensions are 110 x 144 cm. The painting is catalogue number 15 in Slive's 2001 catalogue raisonné of Ruisdael.

Similar work by Jacob van Ruisdael, with their catalogue number from Slive's 2001 catalogue raisonné:

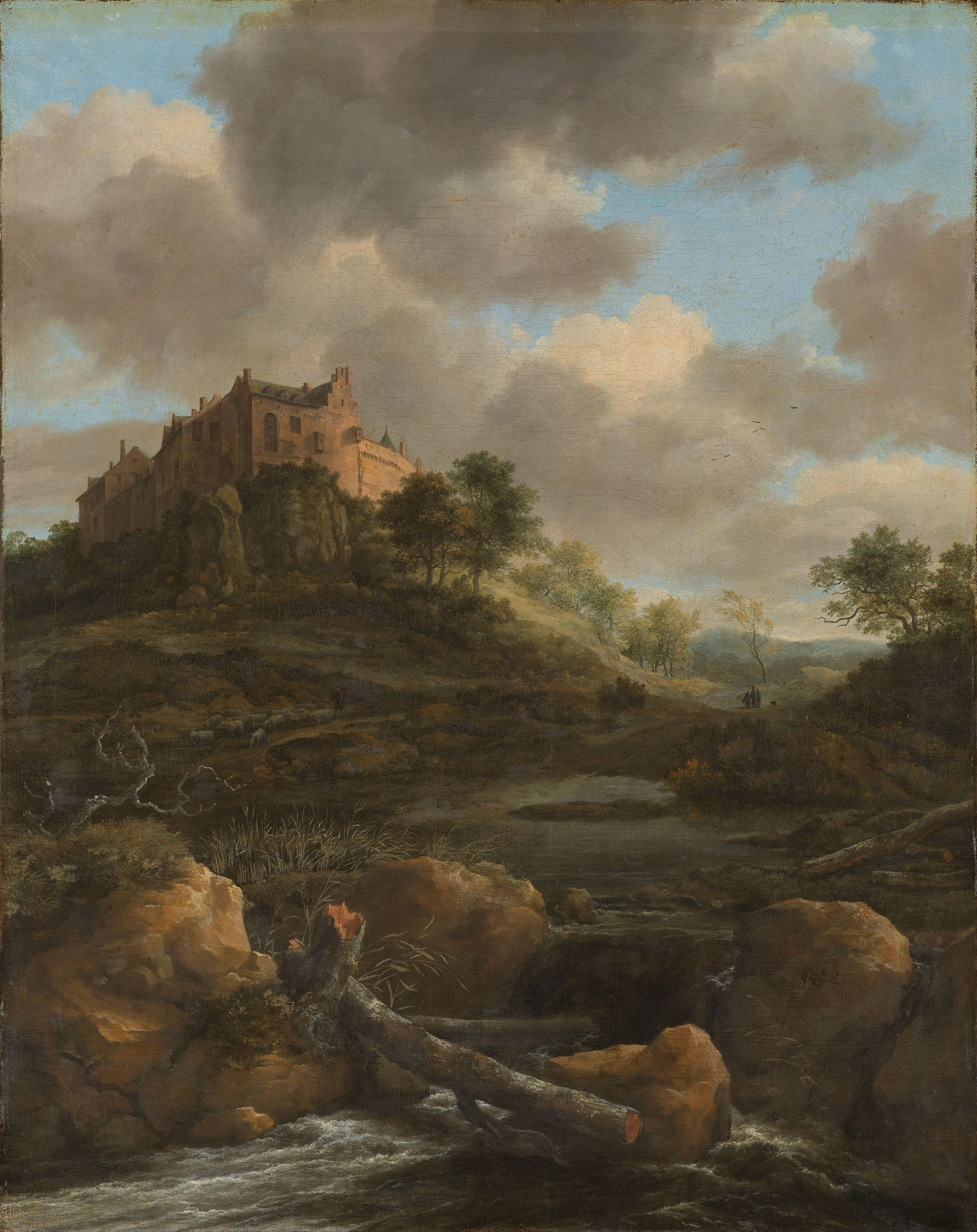
Rijksmuseum version (Cat. No. 10)

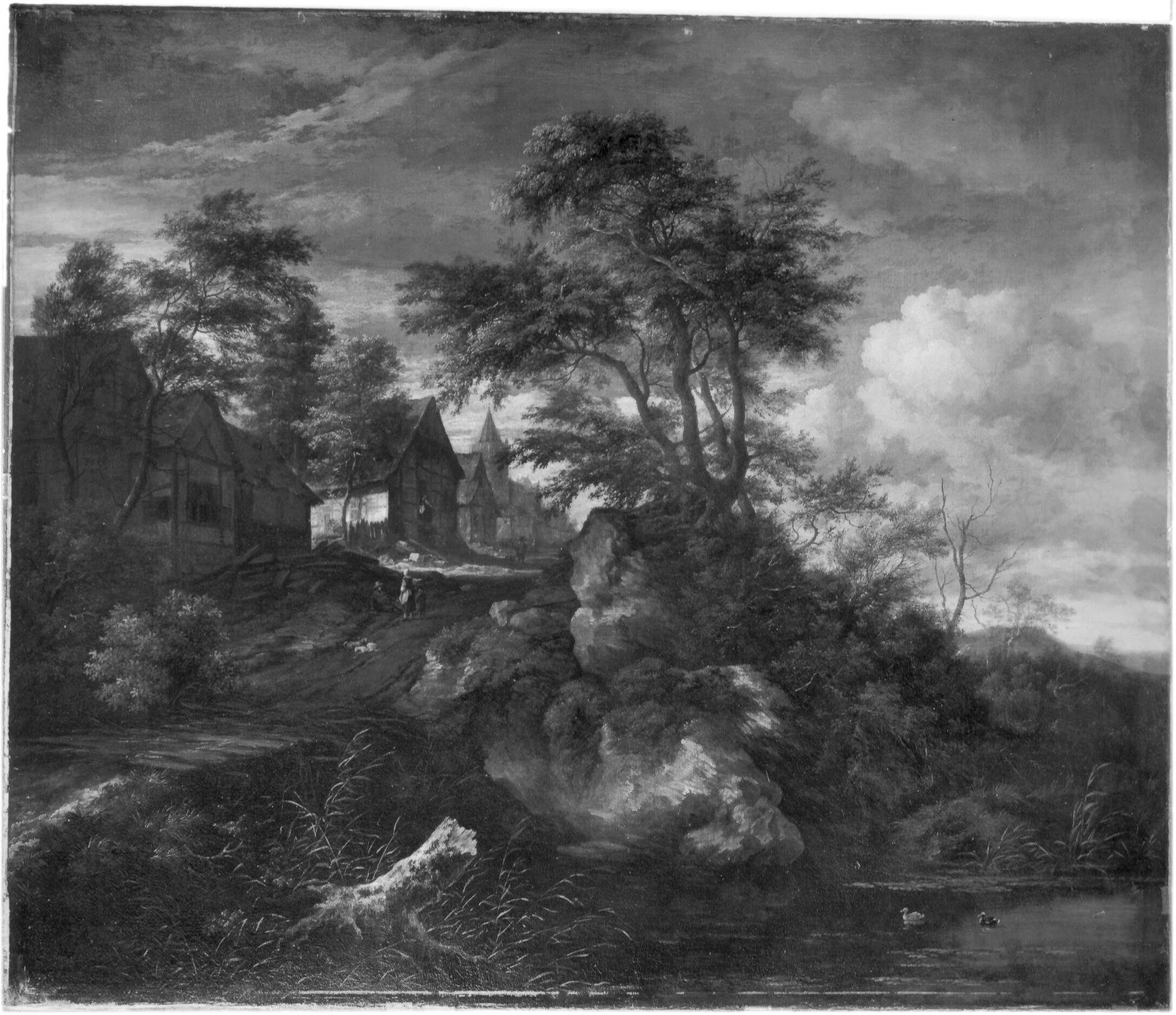
Augsburg version (Cat. No. 11)

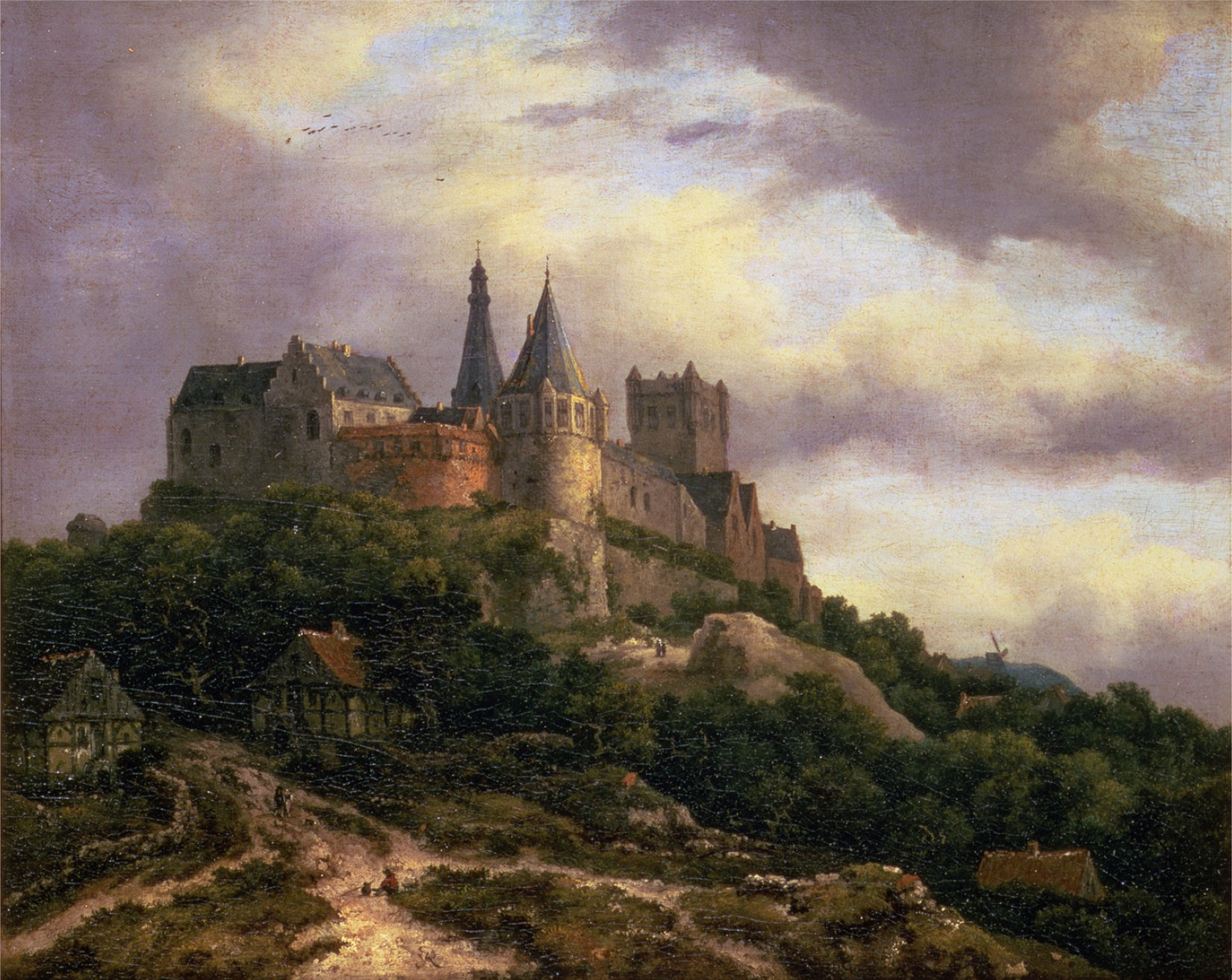
London version (Cat. No. 19)

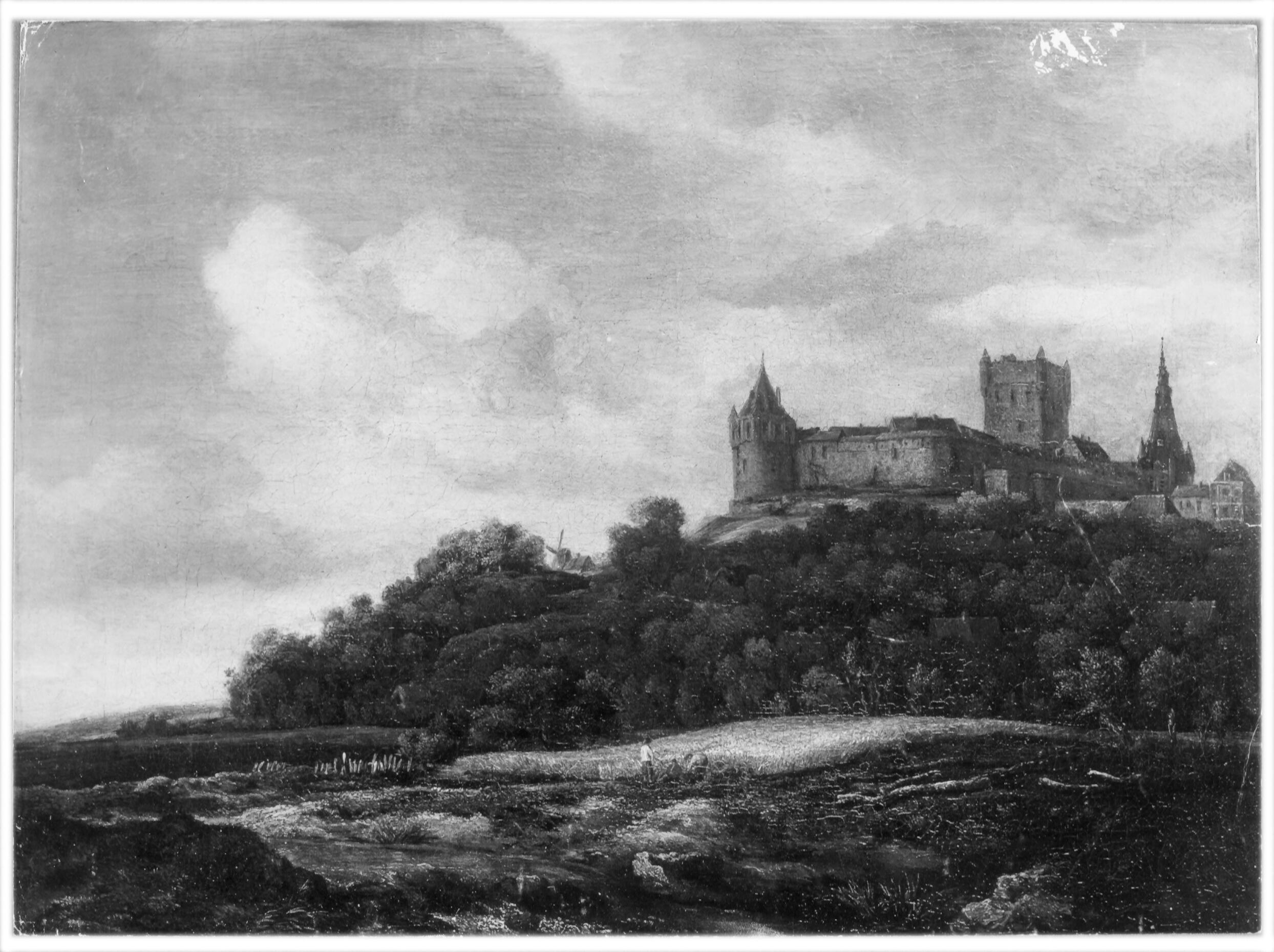
Cat. No. 21

== See also ==
- List of paintings by Jacob van Ruisdael
