= Jacob van Ruisdael =

Dutch landscape painter and engraver (c. 1629–1682)

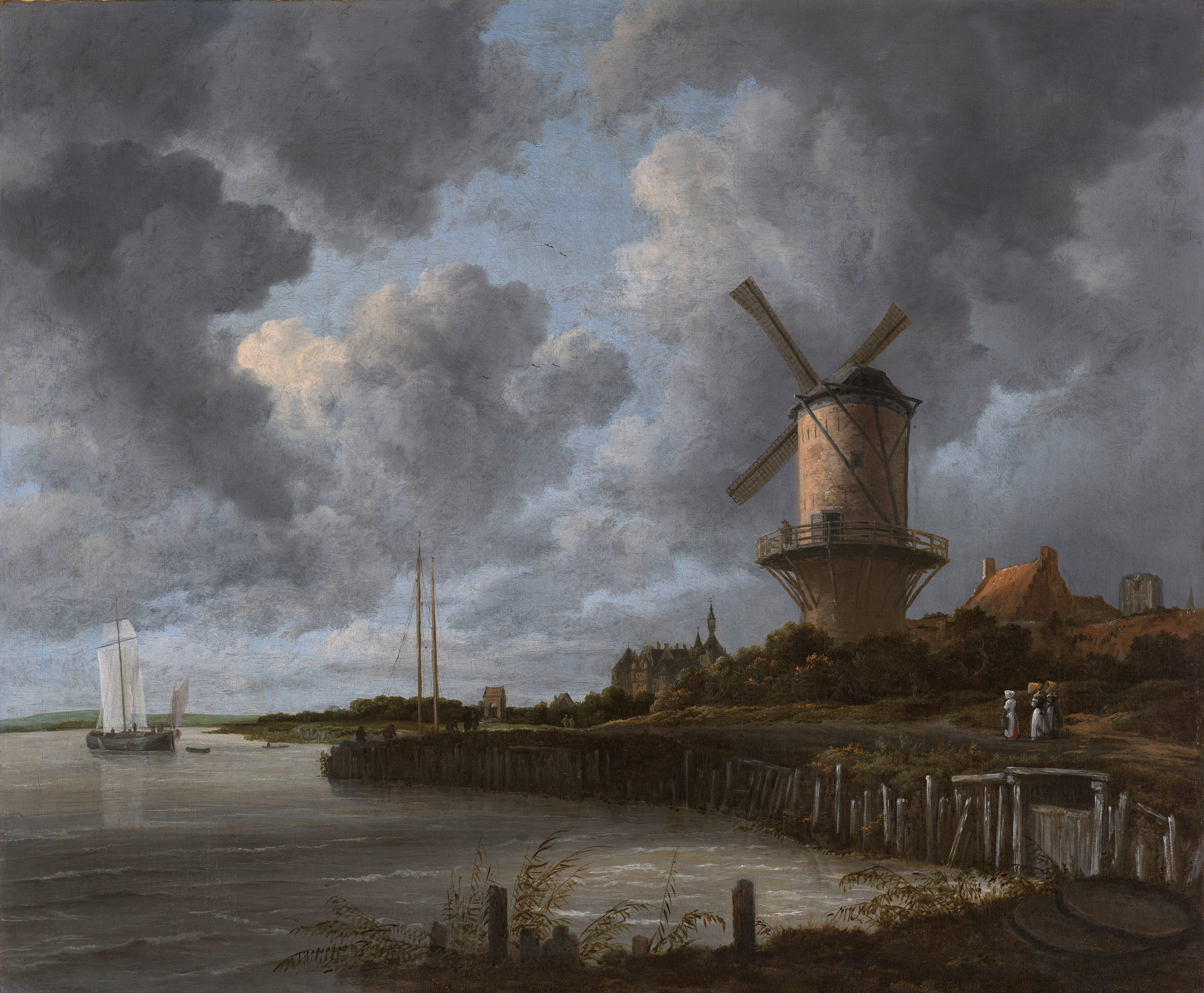
- Windmill at Wijk bij Duurstede (c. 1670)
- Born: Jacob Isaackszoon van Ruisdael; 1628 or 1629; Haarlem, Dutch Republic
- Died: 10 March 1682 (aged 52–53); Amsterdam, Dutch Republic
- Known for: Landscape painting
- Notable work: The Jewish Cemetery, Windmill at Wijk bij Duurstede, View of Haarlem with Bleaching Fields, The Ray of Light, A Wooded Marsh
- Movement: Dutch Golden Age; Baroque
- Patrons: Cornelis de Graeff (1599–1664)

Jacob Isaackszoon van Ruisdael (Dutch pronunciation: [ˈjaːkɔp fɑn ˈrœyzdaːl]; c. 1629 – 10 March 1682) was a Dutch painter, draughtsman, and etcher. He is generally considered the pre-eminent landscape painter of the Dutch Golden Age, a period of great wealth and cultural achievement when Dutch painting became highly popular.

Prolific and versatile, Ruisdael depicted a wide variety of landscape subjects. From 1646 he painted Dutch countryside scenes of remarkable quality for a young man. After a trip to Germany in 1650, his landscapes took on a more heroic character. In his late work, conducted when he lived and worked in Amsterdam, he added city panoramas and seascapes to his regular repertoire. In these, the sky often took up two-thirds of the canvas. In total he produced more than 150 Scandinavian views featuring waterfalls.

Ruisdael's only registered pupil was Meindert Hobbema, one of several artists who painted figures in his landscapes. Hobbema's work has at times been confused with Ruisdael's. Ruisdael always spelt his name thus: Ruisdael, not Ruysdael.

Ruisdael's work was in demand in the Dutch Republic during his lifetime. Today it is spread across private and institutional collections around the world; the National Gallery in London, the Rijksmuseum in Amsterdam, and the Hermitage Museum in St. Petersburg hold the largest collections. Ruisdael shaped landscape painting traditions worldwide, from the English Romantics to the Barbizon school in France, and the Hudson River School in the US, and influenced generations of Dutch landscape artists.

== Life ==
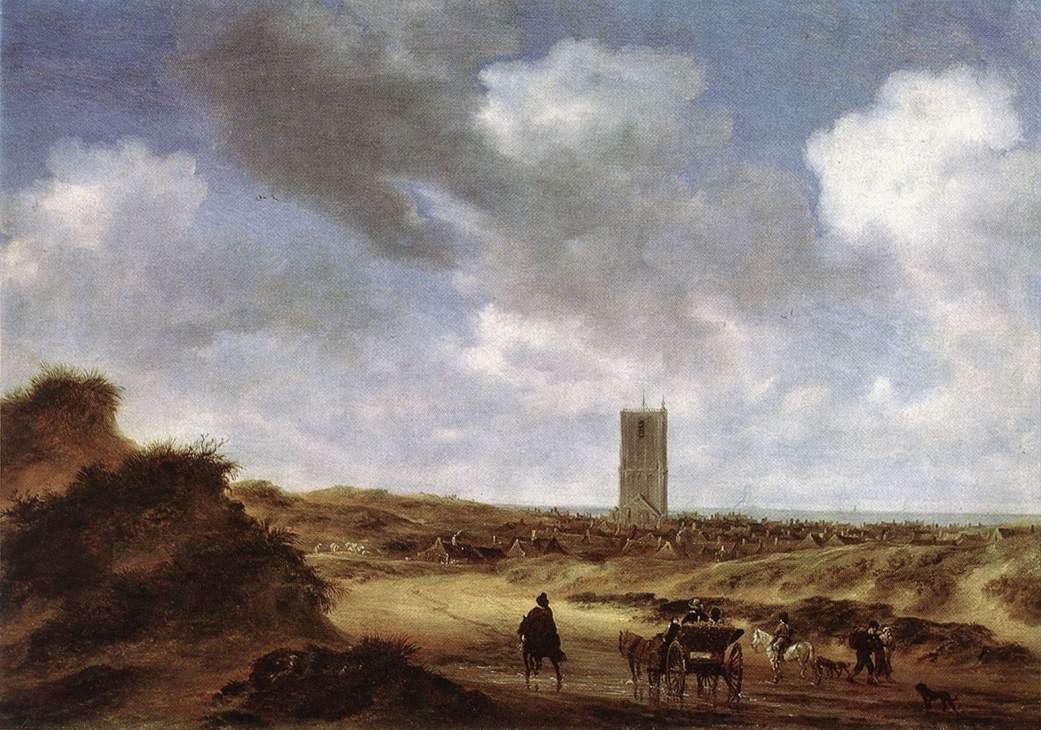
A View of Egmond aan Zee (1640) by Salomon van Ruysdael

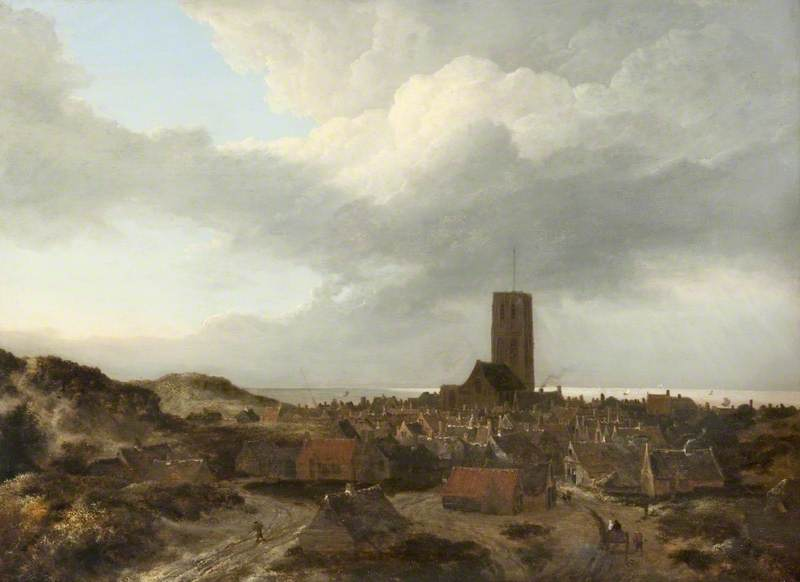
A View of Egmond aan Zee (c. 1650) by Jacob van Ruisdael

Jacob Isaackszoon van Ruisdael was born in Haarlem in 1628 or 1629 (Note: This is inferred from a document dated 9 June 1661 in which Ruisdael states he is aged 32 years old.) into a family of painters, all landscapists. The number of painters in the family, and the multiple spellings of the van Ruisdael name, have hampered attempts to document his life and attribute his works. The name Ruisdael is connected to a castle, now lost, in the village of Blaricum. The village was the home of Jacob's grandfather, the furniture maker Jacob de Goyer. When de Goyer moved away to Naarden, three of his sons changed their name to van Ruysdael or van Ruisdael, probably to indicate their origin. (Note: While in modern Dutch the "uy" spelling is only preserved in names and the "ui" is dominant, before modern spelling regulations the "uy" was spelled interchangeably with "uij", with "ij" in combination just being another way to represent "y", and "ui" being shorthand for "uij". The long list of common spellings of the Ruisdael name over the centuries includes "uy", "uij", and "ui".) Two of De Goyer's sons became painters: Jacob's father Isaack van Ruisdael and his well-known uncle Salomon van Ruysdael. (Note: Unlike his other family members, his uncle Salomon is well-known today and has works on display in, for instance, the National Gallery in London and the National Gallery of Art in Washington D.C.) Jacob himself always spelled his name with an "i", while his cousin, Salomon's son Jacob Salomonszoon van Ruysdael, also a landscape artist, spelled his name with a "y". Jacob's earliest biographer, Arnold Houbraken, called him Jakob Ruisdaal.

It is not known whether Ruisdael's mother was Isaack van Ruisdael's first wife, whose name is unknown, or his second wife, Maycken Cornelisdochter. Isaack and Maycken married on 12 November 1628. (Note: To add to the name confusion, Jacob's aunt, wife of Salomon, also was called Maycken.)

Ruisdael's teacher is also unknown. It is often assumed Ruisdael studied with his father and uncle, but there is no evidence for this. He appears to have been strongly influenced by other contemporary local Haarlem landscapists, most notably Cornelis Vroom and Allart van Everdingen.

The earliest date that appears on a Ruisdael painting and etching is 1646. (Note: It was unusual that signed and dated works of an artist were created before matriculation in a guild.) Two years after this date he was admitted to membership of the Haarlem Guild of St. Luke. By this time landscape paintings were as popular as history paintings in Dutch households, though at the time of Ruisdael's birth, history paintings appeared far more frequently. This growth in popularity of landscapes continued throughout Ruisdael's career. (Note: Though most popular, landscape painting was still not seen as the pinnacle of painting. In his 1678 treatise on painting, painter-writer Samuel van Hoogstraten reserved top spot in the hierarchy of genres for history painting.)

Around 1657, Ruisdael moved to Amsterdam, by then a prosperous city which was likely to have offered a bigger market for his work. His fellow Haarlem painter Allaert van Everdingen had already moved to Amsterdam and found a market there. On 17 June 1657 he was baptized in Ankeveen, near Naarden. Ruisdael lived and worked in Amsterdam for the rest of his life. In 1668, his name appears as a witness to the marriage of Meindert Hobbema, his only registered pupil, a painter whose works have, by some, been confused with Ruisdael's own.

For a landscape artist, it seems Ruisdael travelled relatively little: to Blaricum, Egmond aan Zee, and Rhenen in the 1640s, with Nicolaes Berchem to Bentheim and Steinfurt just across the border in Germany in 1650, and possibly with Hobbema across the German border again in 1661, via the Veluwe, Deventer and Ootmarsum. Despite Ruisdael's numerous Norwegian landscapes, there is no record of him having travelled to Scandinavia.

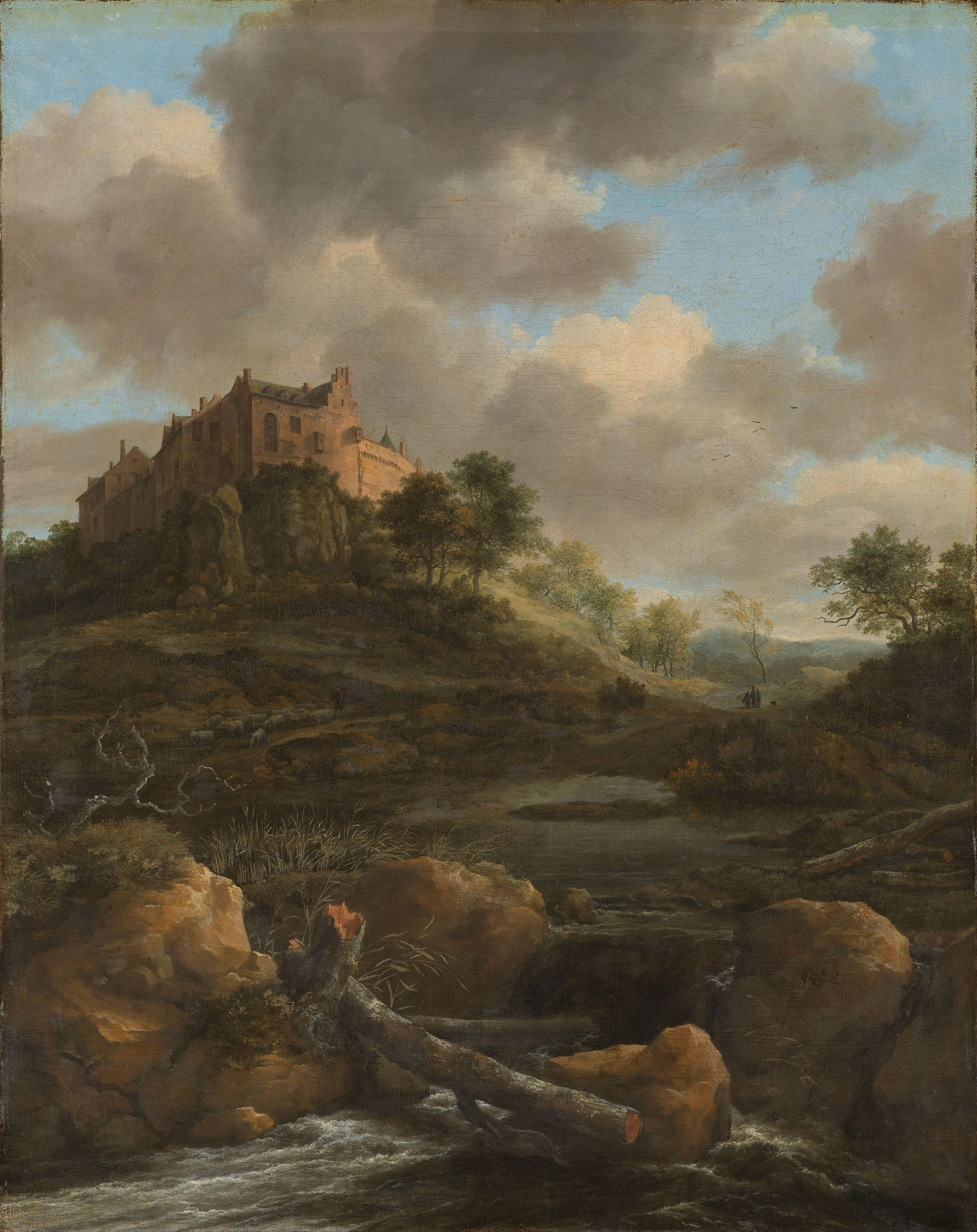
A View of Bentheim Castle (1650s) by Jacob van Ruisdael

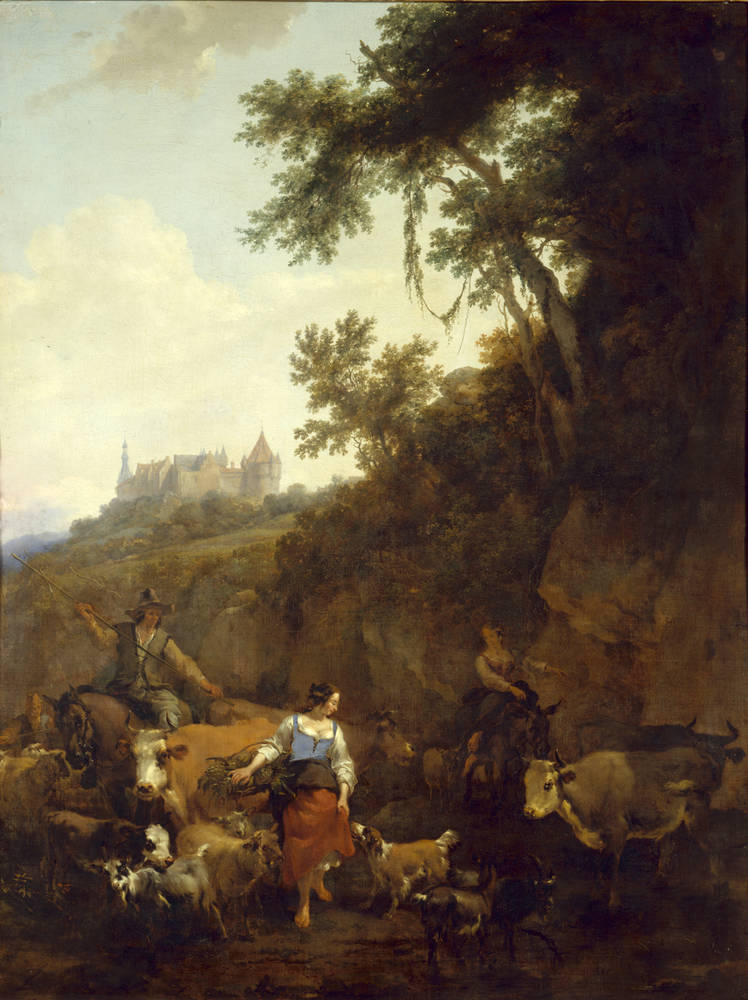
A View of Burg Bentheim (c. 1656) Nicolaas Berchem

There is some speculation that Ruisdael was also a doctor. In 1718, his biographer Houbraken reports that he studied medicine and performed surgery in Amsterdam. Archival records of the 17th century show the name "Jacobus Ruijsdael" on a list of Amsterdam doctors, albeit crossed out, with the added remark that he earned his medical degree on 15 October 1676 in Caen, northern France. Various art historians have speculated that this was, in all probability, a case of mistaken identity. Pieter Scheltema suggests it was Ruisdael's cousin who appeared on the record. The Ruisdael expert Seymour Slive argues that the spelling "uij" is not consistent with Ruisdael's own spelling of his name, that his unusually high production suggests there was little time to study medicine, and that there is no indication in any of his art that he visited northern France. The evidence is inconclusive.

Ruisdael was not Jewish. Slive reports that, because of Ruisdael's depiction of a Jewish cemetery and various biblical names in the Ruisdael family, he often heard speculation that Ruisdael must surely be Jewish. The evidence shows otherwise. Ruisdael was buried in the Saint Bavo's Church, Haarlem, a Protestant church at that time. His uncle Salomon van Ruysdael belonged to the Young Flemish subgroup of the Mennonite congregation, one of several types of Anabaptists in Haarlem, and it is probable that Ruisdael's father was also a member there. His cousin Jacob was a registered Mennonite in Amsterdam.

Ruisdael did not marry. According to Houbraken, whose short biography does contain a few errors, this was "to reserve time to serve his old father". No likeness of Ruisdael is known to exist (Note: The Dutch coffee and tea company De Zuid-Hollandsche Koffie- en Theehandel published picture books in the 1920s with portraits of famous figures from Dutch history and the 1926 edition showed a portrait of "Jacob Isaaksz. Ruisdael" (sic). It is not known where the coffee and tea company got the image from. Two 19th-century sculptures, one on the outside wall of the Kunsthalle Hamburg built in 1863, and one inside the Louvre made by Louis-Denis Caillouette in 1822, are also not traceable back to a source.)

The art historian Hendrik Frederik Wijnman disproved the myth that Ruisdael died a poor man, supposedly in the old men's almshouse in Haarlem. Wijnman showed that the person who died there was in fact Ruisdael's cousin, Jacob Salomonszoon. Although there is no record of Ruisdael owning land or shares, he appears to have lived comfortably, even after the economic downturn of the disaster year 1672. (Note: Tax records show Ruisdael paid 10 guilders for the 0.5% wealth tax in 1674, indicating his net worth was 2,000 guilders.) His paintings were valued fairly highly. In a large sample of inventories between 1650 and 1679 the average price for a Ruisdael was 40 guilders, compared to an average of 19 guilders for all attributed paintings. In a ranking of contemporary Dutch painters based on price-weighted frequency in these inventories, Ruisdael ranks seventh; Rembrandt ranks first.

Ruisdael died in Amsterdam on 10 March 1682. He was buried 14 March 1682 in Saint Bavo's Church, Haarlem.

== Work ==
=== Early years ===
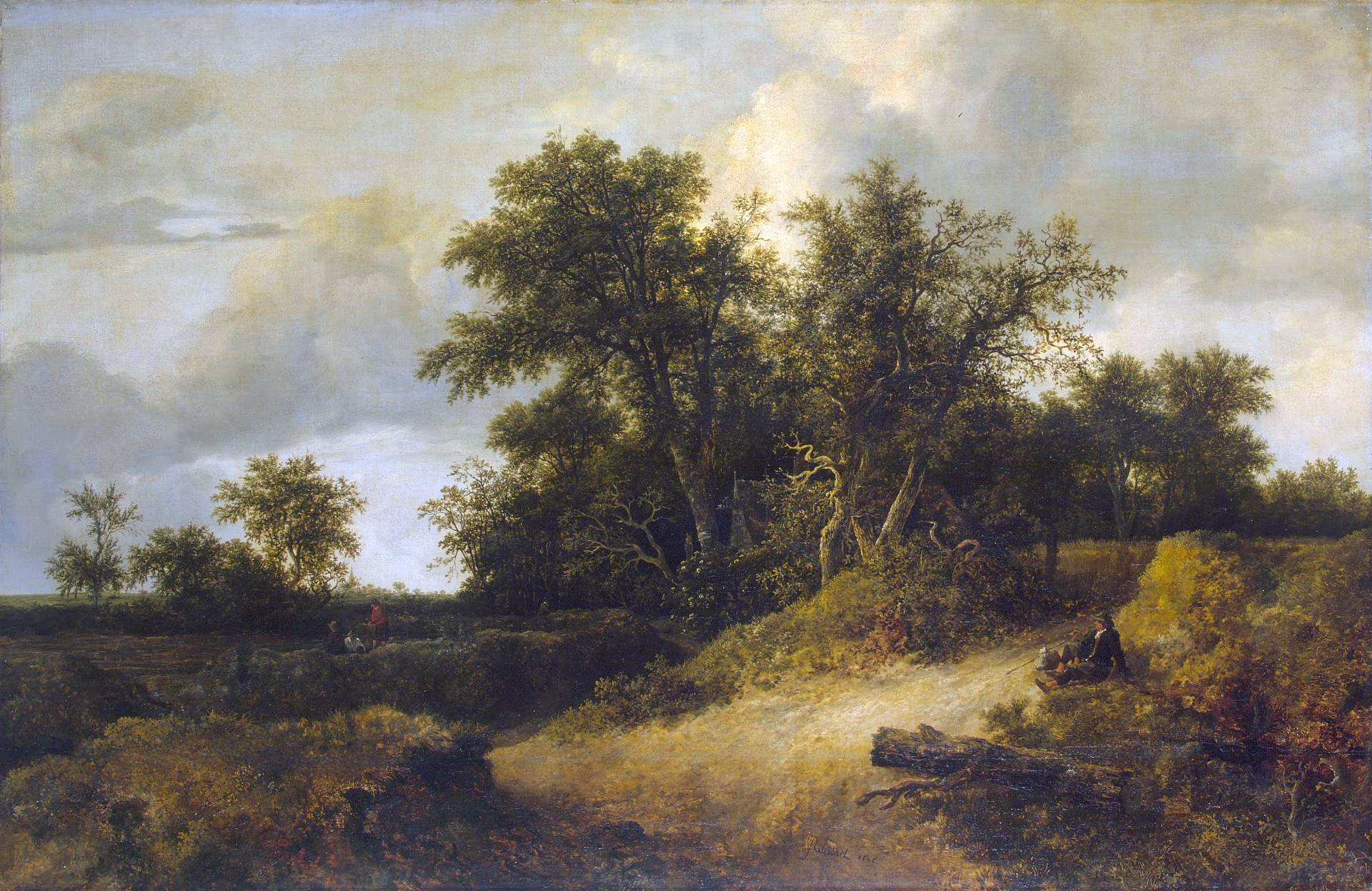
Dune Landscape (1646)

Ruisdael's work from c. 1646 to the early 1650s, when he was living in Haarlem, is characterised by simple motifs and careful and laborious study of nature: dunes, woods, and atmospheric effects. By applying heavier paint than his predecessors, Ruisdael gave his foliage a rich quality, conveying a sense of sap flowing through branches and leaves. His accurate rendering of trees was unprecedented at the time: the genera of his trees are the first to be unequivocally recognisable by modern-day botanists. His early sketches introduce motifs that would return in all his work: a sense of spaciousness and luminosity, and an airy atmosphere achieved through pointillist-like touches of chalk. Most of his thirty black chalk sketches that survive date from this period.

An exemplar of Ruisdael's early style is Dune Landscape, one of the earliest works, dated 1646. It breaks with the classic Dutch tradition of depicting broad views of dunes that include houses and trees flanked by distant vistas. Instead, Ruisdael places tree-covered dunes prominently at centre stage, with a cloudscape concentrating strong light on a sandy path. The resulting heroic effect is enhanced by the large size of the canvas, "so unexpected in the work of an inexperienced painter" according to Irina Sokolova, curator at the Hermitage Museum. The art historian Hofstede de Groot said of Dune Landscape: "It is hardly credible that it should be the work of a boy of seventeen".

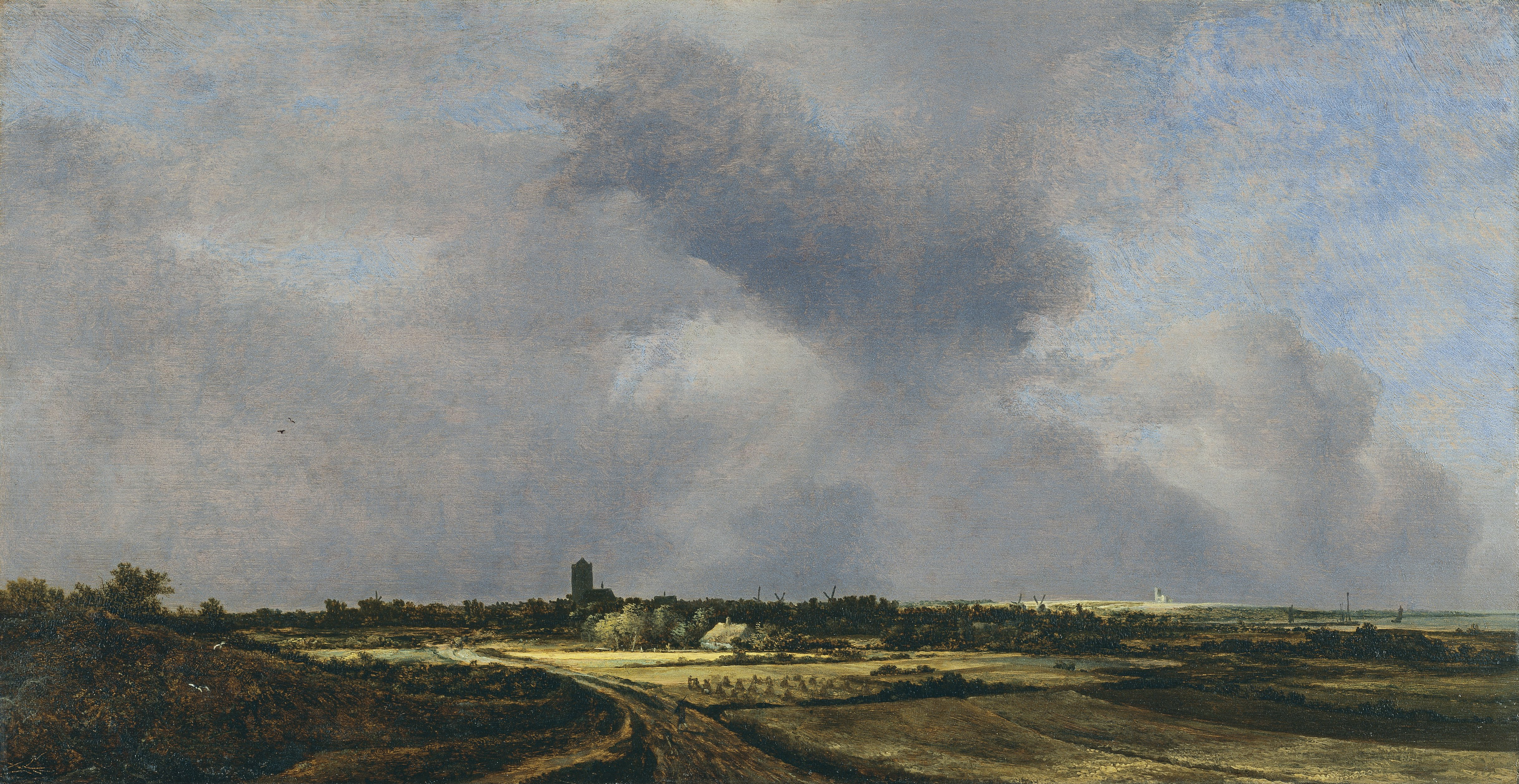
View of Naarden with the Church at Muiderberg in the Distance (1647)

Ruisdael's first panoramic landscape, View of Naarden with the Church at Muiderberg in the Distance, dates from 1647. The theme of an overwhelming sky and a distant town, in this case the birthplace of his father, is one he returned to in his later years.

For unknown reasons, Ruisdael almost entirely stopped dating his work from 1653. Only five works from the 1660s have a, partially obscured, year next to his signature; none from the 1670s and 1680s have a date. Dating subsequent work has therefore been largely based on detective work and speculation.

All thirteen known Ruisdael etchings come from his early period, with the first one dated 1646. It is unknown who taught him the art of etching. No etchings exist signed by his father, his uncle, or his fellow Haarlem landscapist Cornelis Vroom, who influenced his other work. His etchings show little influence from Rembrandt, either in style or technique. Few original impressions exist; five etchings survive in only a single impression. The rarity of prints suggests that Ruisdael considered them trial essays, which did not warrant large editions. The etching expert Georges Duplessis singled out Grainfield at the Edge of a Wood and Forest Marsh with Travellers on a Bank as unrivalled illustrations of Ruisdael's genius.

=== Middle period ===
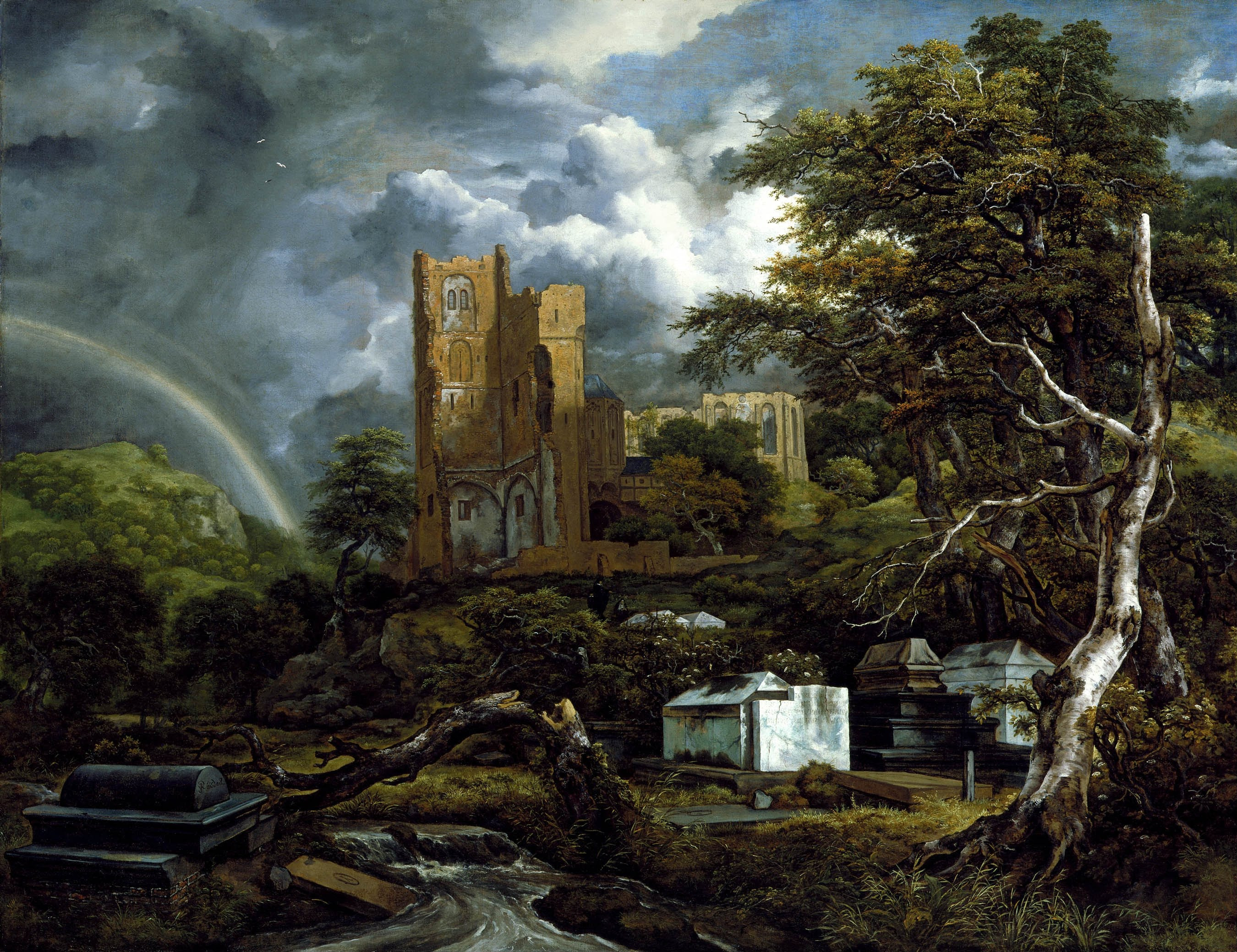
The Jewish Cemetery (c. 1654–55)

Following Ruisdael's trip to Germany, his landscapes took on a more heroic character, with forms becoming larger and more prominent. A view of Bentheim Castle, dated 1653, is just one of a dozen of Ruisdael's depictions of a particular castle in Germany, almost all of which pronounce its position on a hilltop. Significantly, Ruisdael made numerous changes to the castle's setting (it is actually on an unimposing low hill) culminating in a 1653 version which shows it on a wooded mountain. These variations are rightly considered by art historians to be evidence of Ruisdael's compositional skills. (Note: Other evidence of his compositional skills includes the botanically accurate representation of the shrub Viburnum lantana on the 1653 Bentheim Castle painting, for which there is no evidence of ever have been present in this area.)

On his trip to Germany, Ruisdael encountered water mills which he turned into a principal subject for painting, the first artist to ever do so. Two Water Mills with an Open Sluice, dated 1653, is a prime example. The ruins of Egmond Castle near Alkmaar were another favourite subject of Ruisdael's and feature in The Jewish Cemetery, of which he painted two versions. With these, Ruisdael pits the natural world against the built environment, which has been overrun by the trees and shrubs surrounding the cemetery.

Ruisdael's first Scandinavian views contain big firs, rugged mountains, large boulders and rushing torrents. Though convincingly realistic, they are based on previous art works, rather than on direct experience. There is no record that Ruisdael made any trip to Scandinavia, although fellow Haarlem painter Allart van Everdingen had travelled there in 1644 and had popularised the subgenre. Ruisdael's work soon outstripped van Everdingen's finest efforts. In total Ruisdael produced more than 150 Scandinavian views featuring waterfalls, of which Waterfall in a Mountainous Landscape with a Ruined Castle, c. 1665–1670, is seen as his greatest by Slive.

In this period Ruisdael started painting coastal scenes and sea-pieces, influenced by Simon de Vlieger and Jan Porcellis. Among the most dramatic is Rough Sea at a Jetty, with a restricted palette of only black, white, blue and a few brown earth colours. However, forest scenes remain a subject of choice, such as the Hermitage's most famous Ruisdael, A Wooded Marsh, dated c. 1665, which depicts a primieval scene with broken birches and oaks, and branches reaching for the sky amidst an overgrown pond.

=== Later years ===
During Ruisdael's last period he began to depict mountain scenes, such as Mountainous and Wooded Landscape with a River, dateable to the late 1670s. This portrays a rugged range with the highest peak in the clouds. Ruisdael's subjects became unusually varied. The art historian Wolfgang Stechow identified thirteen themes within the Dutch Golden Age landscape genre, and Ruisdael's work encompasses all but two of them, excelling at most: forests, rivers, dunes and country roads, panoramas, imaginary landscapes, Scandinavian waterfalls, marines, beachscapes, winter scenes, town views, and nocturnes. Only the Italianate and foreign landscapes other than Scandinavian are absent from his oeuvre.

The imaginary landscapes of gardens that Ruisdael painted in the 1670s actually reflect an ongoing discourse on the Picturesque in circles of gardening aesthetes like Constantijn Huygens.

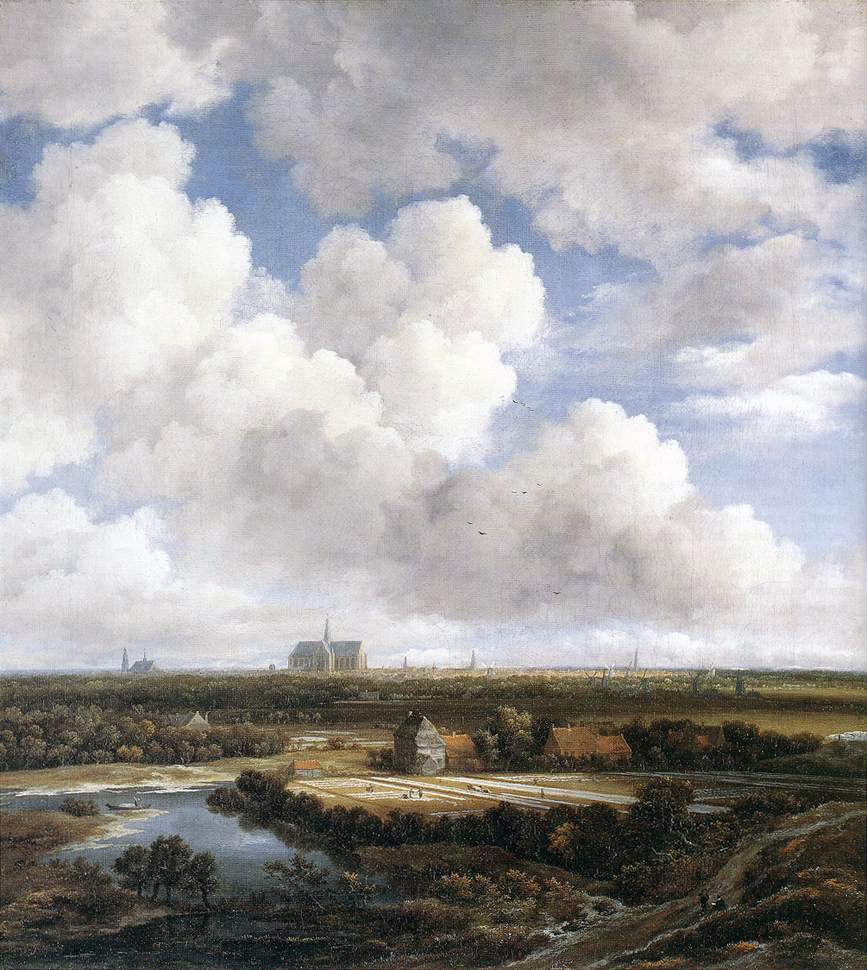
View of Haarlem with Bleaching Fields (c. 1665)

Slive finds it appropriate that a windmill is the subject of one of Ruisdael's most famous works. Windmill at Wijk bij Duurstede, dated 1670, shows Wijk bij Duurstede, a riverside town about 20 kilometres (12 mi) from Utrecht, with a dominant cylindrical windmill. In this composition, Ruisdael united typical Dutch elements of low-lying land, water and expansive sky, so that they converge on the equally characteristic Dutch windmill. The painting's enduring popularity is evidenced by card sales in the Rijksmuseum, with the Windmill ranking third after Rembrandt's The Night Watch and Vermeer's View of Delft. Windmills featured throughout Ruisdael's entire career.

Various panoramic views of the Haarlem skyline and its bleaching grounds appear during this stage, a specific genre called Haerlempjes, with the clouds creating various gradations of alternating bands of light and shadow towards the horizon. The paintings are often dominated by Saint Bavo's Church, in which Ruisdael would one day be buried.

While Amsterdam does feature in his work, it does so relatively rarely given that Ruisdael lived there for over 25 years. It does feature in his only known architectural subject, a drawing of the interior of the Old Church, as well as in views of the Dam, and the Panoramic view of the Amstel looking toward Amsterdam, one of Ruisdael's last paintings.

Figures are introduced sparingly into Ruisdael's compositions, and are by this period rarely from his own hand (Note: It is assumed that in his early years Ruisdael painted the staffage himself. Landscape with a Cottage and Trees of 1646 is one such example. The figures in most of his panoramic views are also of his own hand. Art historian Robert Watson writes that the odd tendency to hire each other to paint small figures in landscapes suggests a taboo guarding the barrier between the human and the natural.) but executed by various artists, including his pupil Meindert Hobbema, Nicolaes Berchem, Adriaen van de Velde, Philips Wouwerman, Jan Vonck, Thomas de Keyser, Gerrit Battem and Johannes Lingelbach.

=== Attributions ===
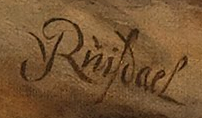
Signature on Landscape with Waterfall in the 1660s

In his 2001 catalogue raisonné, Slive attributes 694 paintings to Ruisdael and lists another 163 paintings with dubious or, he believes, incorrect attribution. There are three main reasons why there is uncertainty over whose hand painted various Ruisdael-style landscapes. Firstly, four members of the Ruysdael family were landscapists with similar signatures, some of which were later fraudulently altered into Jacob's. This is further complicated by the fact that Ruisdael used variations of his signature. This typically reads "JvRuisdael" or the monogram "JVR", sometimes using a small italic 's' and sometimes a Gothic long 's', such as on Landscape with Waterfall. Secondly, many 17th-century landscape paintings are unsigned and could be from pupils or copyists. Finally, fraudsters imitated Ruisdaels for financial gain, with the earliest case reported by Houbraken in 1718: a certain Jan Griffier the Elder could imitate Ruisdael's style so well that he often passed them off as genuine Ruisdaels, especially with figurines added in the style of the artist Wouwerman. There is no large-scale systematic approach to ascertaining Ruisdael's attributions, unlike the forensic science used to find the correct attributions of Rembrandt's paintings through the Rembrandt Research Project.

=== Legacy ===
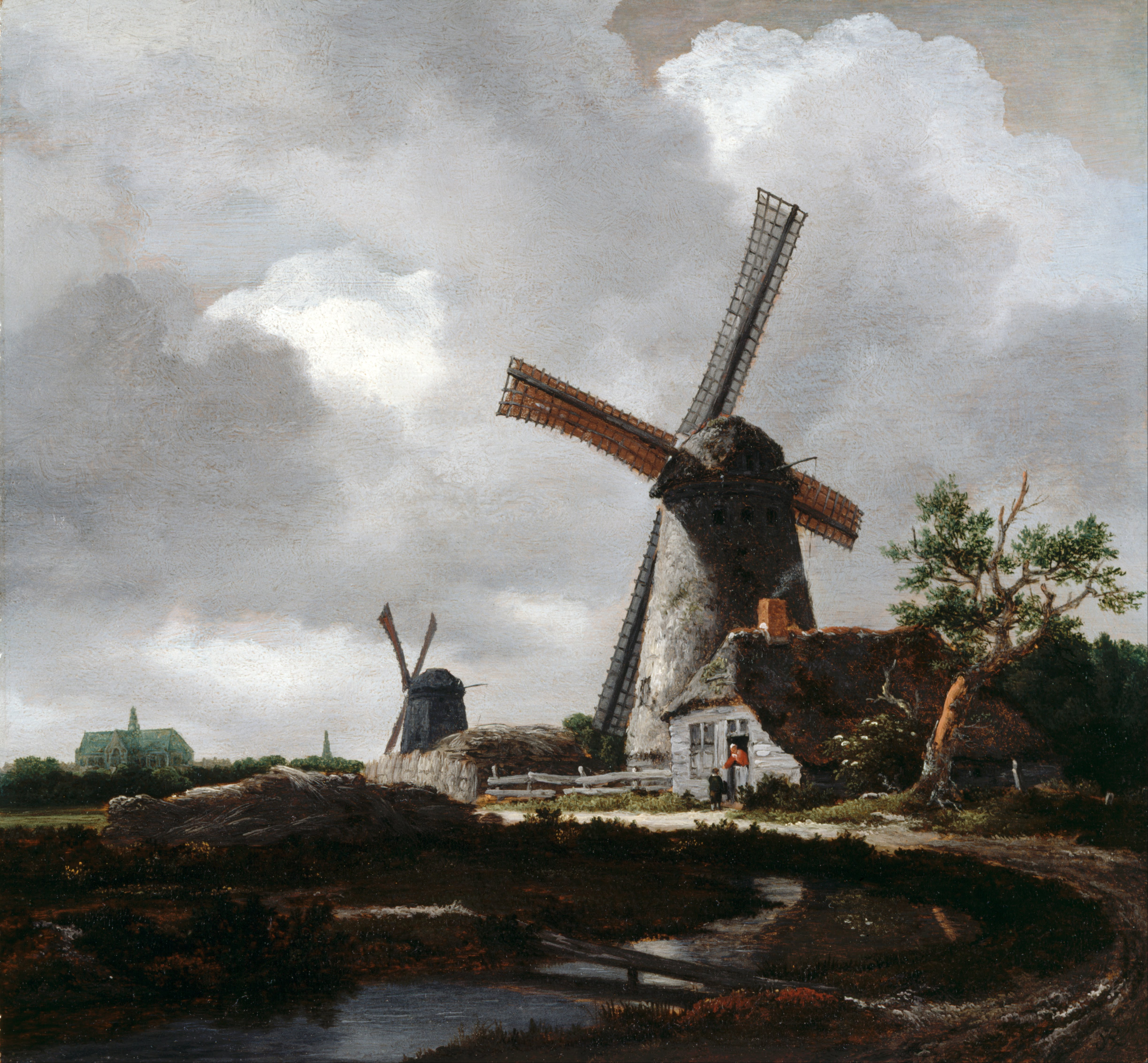
Landscape with Windmills near Haarlem (1651) by Jacob van Ruisdael

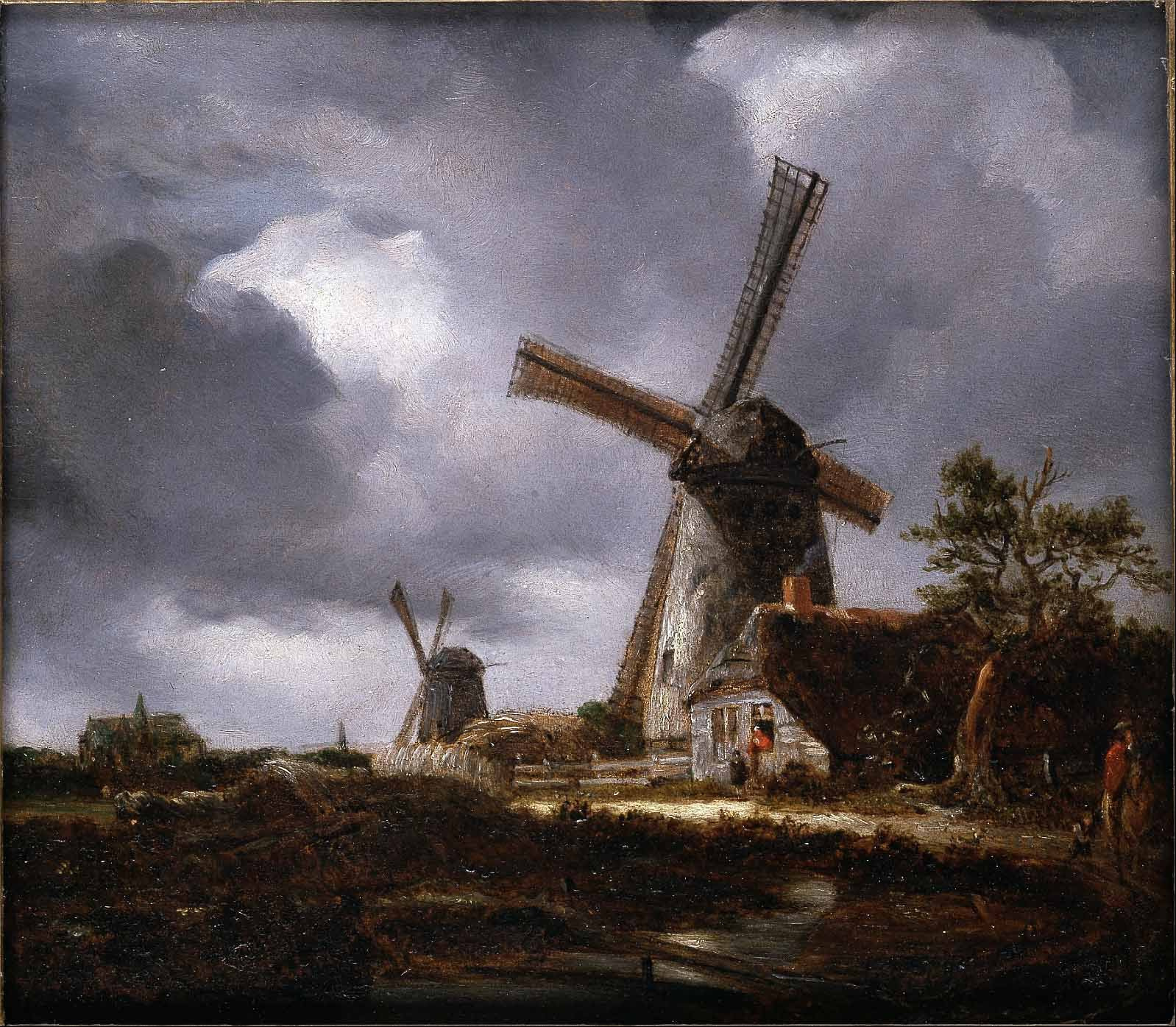
Landscape with Windmills near Haarlem (1830) by John Constable

Ruisdael has shaped landscape painting traditions from the English Romantics to the Barbizon school in France, and the Hudson River School in the US, as well as generations of Dutch landscape artists. Among the English artists influenced by Ruisdael are Thomas Gainsborough, J. M. W. Turner, and John Constable. Gainsborough drew, in black chalk and grey wash, a copy of a Ruisdael in the 1740s—now both paintings are housed in the Louvre in Paris. Turner made many copies of Ruisdaels and even painted fantasy views of a nonexistent port he called Port Ruysdael. Constable also copied various drawings, etchings and paintings by Ruisdael, and was a great admirer from a young age. "It haunts my mind and clings to my heart", he wrote after seeing a Ruisdael. However, he thought Jewish Cemetery was a failure, because he considered that it attempted to convey something outside the reach of art.

In the 19th century, Vincent van Gogh acknowledged Ruisdael as a major influence, calling him sublime, but at the same time saying it would be a mistake to try to copy him. Van Gogh had two Ruisdael prints, The Bush and a Haerlempje, on his wall, and thought the Ruisdaels in the Louvre were "magnificent, especially The Bush, Storm Off a Sea Coast and The Ray of Light". His experience of the French countryside was informed by his memory of Ruisdael's art. Van Gogh's contemporary Claude Monet is also said to be indebted to Ruisdael. Similarly, Piet Mondrian's early abstract compositions the eventually led to the founding of De Stijl have been traced back to Ruisdael's panoramas.

Among art historians and critics, Ruisdael's reputation has had its ups and downs over the centuries. The first account, in 1718, is from Houbraken, who waxed lyrical over the technical mastery which allowed Ruisdael to realistically depict falling water and the sea. In 1781, Sir Joshua Reynolds, founder of the Royal Academy, admired the freshness and force of Ruisdael's landscapes. A couple of decades later other English critics were less impressed. In 1801, Henry Fuseli, professor at the Royal Academy, expressed his contempt for the entire Dutch School of Landscape, dismissing it as no more than a "transcript of the spot", a mere "enumeration of hill and dale, clumps of trees". Of note is that one of Fuseli's students was Constable, whose admiration for Ruisdael remained unchanged. Around the same time in Germany, the writer, statesman and scientist Johann Wolfgang von Goethe lauded Ruisdael as a thinking artist, even a poet, saying "he demonstrates remarkable skill in locating the exact point at which the creative faculty comes into contact with a lucid mind". John Ruskin however, in 1860, raged against Ruisdael and other Dutch Golden Age landscapists, calling their landscapes places where "we lose not only all faith in religion but all remembrance of it". In 1915, the Dutch art historian Abraham Bredius called his compatriot not so much a painter as a poet.

More recent art historians have rated Ruisdael highly. Kenneth Clark described him as "the greatest master of the natural vision before Constable". Waldemar Januszczak finds him a marvellous storyteller. Januszczak does not consider Ruisdael the greatest landscape artist of all time, but is especially impressed by his works as a teenager: "a prodigy whom we should rank at number 8 or 9 on the Mozart scale". Slive states Ruisdael is acknowledged "by general consent, as the pre-eminent landscapist of the Golden Age of Dutch art".

"Ruisdael really doesn't deserve to be underrated. ..[H]e was a prodigy whom we should rank at number 8 or 9 on the Mozart scale."

— The Guardian art critic Waldemar Januszczak

Ruisdael is now seen as the leading artist of the "classical" phase in Dutch landscape art, which built upon the realism of the previous "tonal" phase. The tonal phase suggested atmosphere through the use of tonality, while the classical phase strived for a more grandiose effect, with paintings built up through a series of vigorous contrasts of solid form against the sky, and of light against shade, with a tree, animal, or windmill often singled out.

Although many of Ruisdael's works were on show in the Art Treasures Exhibition, Manchester 1857, and various other grand exhibitions across the world since, it was not until 1981 that an exhibition was solely dedicated to him. Over fifty paintings and thirty-five drawings and etchings were exhibited, first at the Mauritshuis in The Hague, then, in 1982, at the Fogg Museum in Cambridge, Massachusetts. In 2006, the Royal Academy in London hosted a Ruisdael Master of Landscape exhibition, displaying works from over fifty collections.

=== Interpretation ===
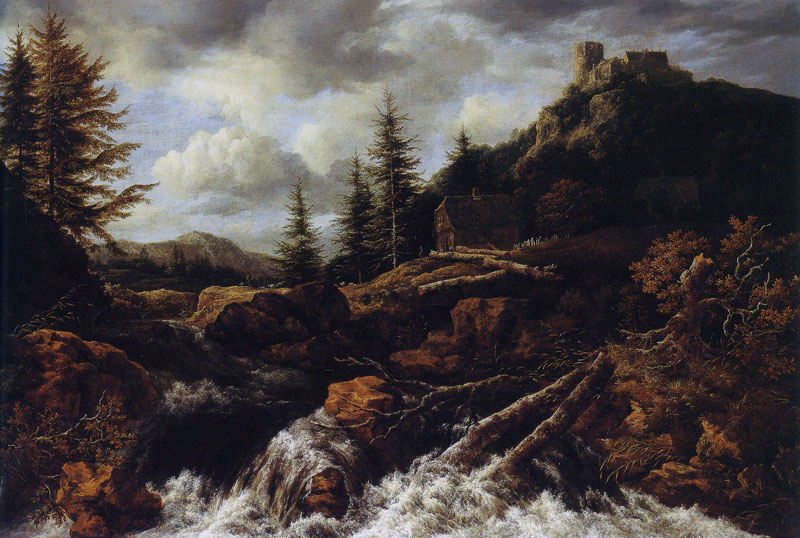
Waterfall in a Mountainous Landscape with a Ruined Castle (c. 1665–1670)

There are no 17th-century documents to indicate, either at first or second hand, what Ruisdael intended to convey through his art. While The Jewish Cemetery is universally accepted as an allegory for the fragility of life, how other works should be interpreted is much disputed. At one end of the spectrum is Henry Fuseli, who contends they have no meaning at all, and are simply a depiction of nature. At the other end is Franz Theodor Kugler who sees meaning in almost everything: "They all display the silent power of Nature, who opposes with her mighty hand the petty activity of man, and with a solemn warning as it were, repels his encroachments".

In the middle of the spectrum are scholars such as E. John Walford, who sees the works as "not so much bearers of narrative or emblematic meanings but rather as images reflecting the fact that the visible world was essentially perceived as manifesting inherent spiritual significance". Walford advocates abandoning the notion of "disguised symbolism". Perhaps Ruisdael's work can be interpreted according to the religious world view of his time: nature serves as the "first book" of God, both because of its inherent divine qualities and because of God's obvious concern for man and the world. The intention is spiritual, not moral.

Andrew Graham-Dixon asserts all Dutch Golden Age landscapists could not help but search everywhere for meaning. He says of the windmill in The Windmill at Wijk bij Duurstede that it symbolises "the sheer hard work needed to keep Holland above water and to safeguard the future of the nation's children". The symmetries in the landscapes are "reminders to fellow citizens always to remain on the straight and narrow". Slive is more reluctant to read too much into the work, but does put The Windmill in its contemporary religious context of man's dependence on the "spirit of the Lord for life". With regards to interpreting Ruisdael's Scandinavian paintings, he says "My own view is that it strains credulity to the breaking point to propose that he himself conceived of all his depictions of waterfalls, torrents and rushing streams and dead trees as visual sermons on the themes of transcience and vanitas".

=== Collections ===
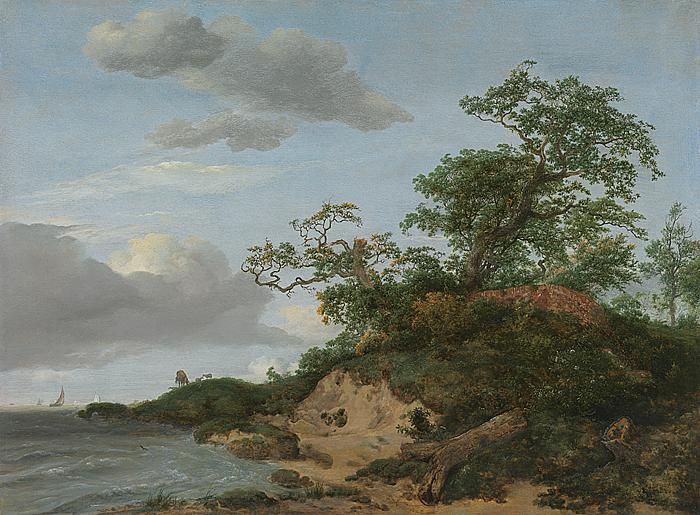
Dunes by the Sea (1648)

Ruisdaels are scattered across collections globally, both private and institutional. The most notable collections are at the National Gallery in London, which holds twenty paintings; the Rijksmuseum in Amsterdam, which holds sixteen paintings; the Hermitage Museum in Saint Petersburg, which holds nine, and the Thyssen-Bornemisza Museum in Madrid, Spain has four (and two additional paintings attributed to Jacob Isaacksz. van Ruisdael). In the US, the Metropolitan Museum of Art in New York has five Ruisdaels in its collection, and the J. Paul Getty Museum in California has three.

On occasion a Ruisdael changes hands. In 2014, Dunes by the Sea was auctioned at Christie's in New York, and realised a price of $1,805,000. Of his surviving drawings, 140 in total, the Rijksmuseum, the Teylers Museum in Haarlem, the Kupferstich-Kabinett, Dresden, and the Hermitage each hold significant collections. Ruisdael's rare etchings are spread across institutions. No collection holds a print of each of the thirteen etchings. Of the five unique prints, the British Museum holds two, two are in the Albertina in Vienna, and one is in Amsterdam.

== Context ==
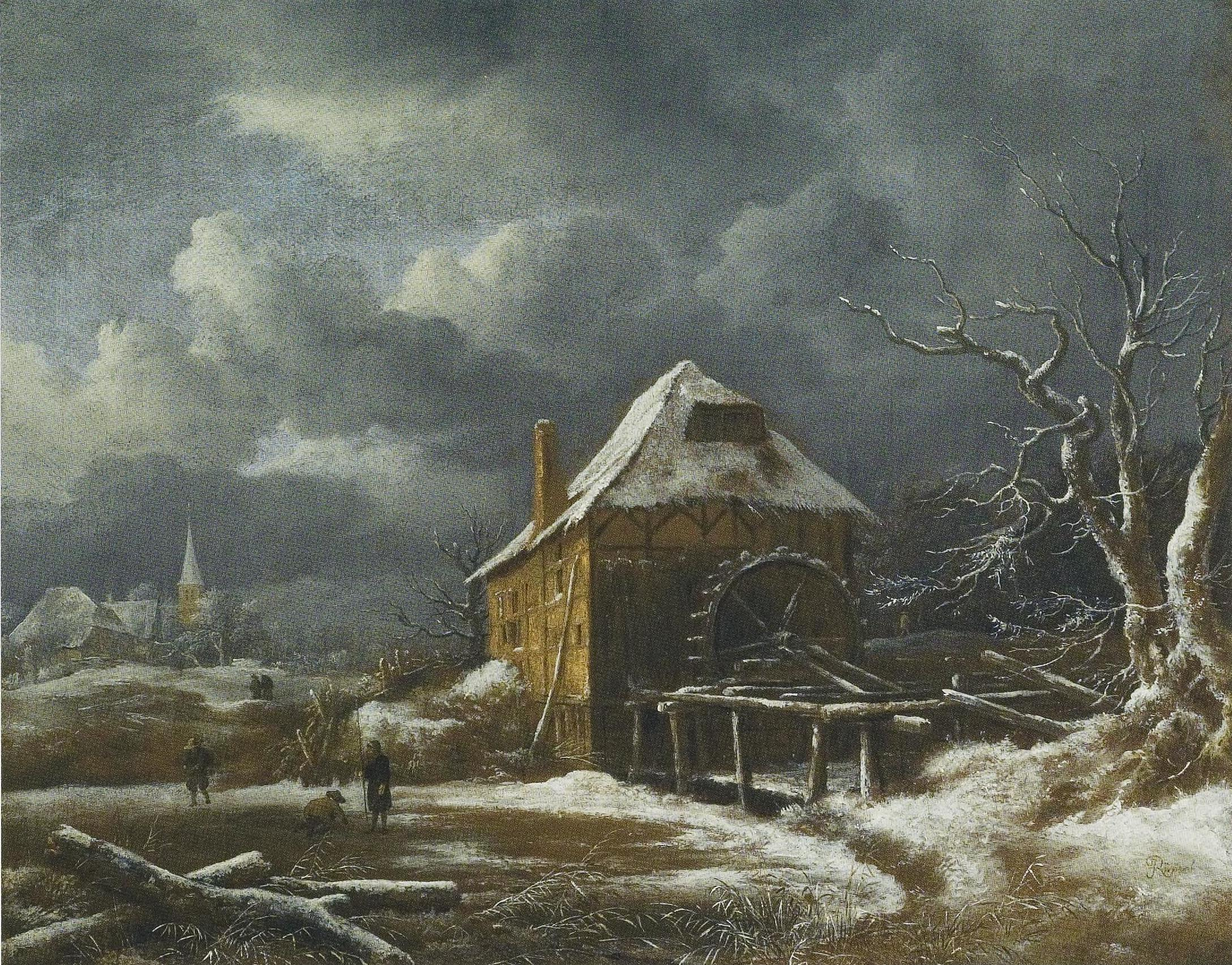
Winter Landscape with a Watermill (c. 1660s)

According to some, Ruisdael and his art should not be considered apart from the context of the incredible wealth and significant changes to the land that occurred during the Dutch Golden Age. In his study on 17th-century Dutch art and culture, Simon Schama remarks that "it can never be overemphasized that the period between 1550 and 1650, when the political identity of an independent Netherlands nation was being established, was also a time of dramatic physical alteration of its landscape". Ruisdael's depiction of nature and emergent Dutch technology are wrapped up in this. Christopher Joby places Ruisdael in the religious context of the Calvinism of the Dutch Republic. He states that landscape painting does conform to Calvin's requirement that only what is visible may be depicted in art, and that landscape paintings such as those of Ruisdael have an epistemological value which provides further support for their use within Reformed Churches.

The art historian Yuri Kuznetsov places Ruisdael's art in the context of the war of independence against Spain. Dutch landscape painters "were called upon to make a portrait of their homeland, twice rewon by the Dutch people – first from the sea and later from foreign invaders". Jonathan Israel, in his study of the Dutch Republic, calls the period between 1647 and 1672 the third phase of Dutch Golden Age art, in which wealthy merchants wanted large, opulent and refined paintings, and civic leaders filled their town halls with grand displays containing republican messages.

As well, ordinary middle class Dutch people began buying art for the first time, creating a high demand for paintings of all kinds. This demand was met by enormous painter guilds. (Note: Based on records of membership of the Guild of Saint Luke, it is estimated there was one painter for every 2,000 to 3,000 inhabitants, compared to every 10,000 in Renaissance Italy. A total of five million paintings were produced in the Dutch Republic in the 17th century. Slive says there were hundreds of landscapists during Ruisdael's time.) Master painters set up studios to produce large numbers of paintings quickly. (Note: Studios already existed before Ruisdael was born. Painters from the tonal phase had also developed efficient techniques such as wet-into-wet paint, but this was not used by the classical phase painters, who strived for a high level of realism.) Under the master's direction, studio members would specialise in parts of a painting, such as figures in landscapes, or costumes in portraits and history paintings. (Note: It is not certain if Ruisdael had more pupils other than Hobbema in his studio, but at least four other artists have been identified as having provided staffage for his landscapes.) Masters would sometimes add a few touches to authenticate a work mostly done by pupils, to maximise both speed and price. Numerous art dealers organised commissions on behalf of patrons, as well as buying uncommissioned stock to sell on. Landscape artists did not depend on commissions in the way most painters had to do, and could therefore paint for stock. In Ruisdael's case, it is not known whether he kept stock to sell directly to customers, or sold his work through dealers, or both. Art historians only know of one commission, (Note: Art historian Scheyer suggests that it possible that one of the Jewish Cemetery versions was commissioned by the family of Eliahu Montalto, whose tomb is on the painting. Slive does not hold this for impossible.) a work for the wealthy Amsterdam burgomaster Cornelis de Graeff, jointly painted with Thomas de Keyser. (Note: This work, The Arrival of Cornelis de Graeff and Members of His Family at Soestdijk, His Country Estate (c. 1660), is unusual in Ruisdael's oeuvre for another reason. It is also the only one in which his landscape is the background to the work of another artist.)
