= Young Flemish =

Mennonite subgroup

Young Flemish was a subgroup of the Mennonites, itself a subgroup of Anabaptism, from about the 1580s to the 1630s in what is now Belgium and the Netherlands.

From the 1520s Dutch Protestants started to fragment, with the Anabaptists as the first to create a rift. From 1530 to 1550 the Anabaptist movement acted as the Reformation's arm and mouthpiece. Their followers were persecuted which created disagreement among them as to how to handle this, either by taking up arms to resist or passive defiance. On the pacifist side, the followers of David Joris were the bigger group in the 1530s, and the followers of Menno Simons, called Mennonites, the smaller, and mainly in Friesland and Groningen. But by the 1540s the Mennonites had become the mainstream of Dutch Anabaptism. The Mennonites fragmented even further into subgroups. Menno tried to heal the split in 1557 but failed.

In Flanders Flemish Anabaptism grew strongly in the 1550s, inspired by Menno's teachings, but at great cost, with hundreds of executions. When the Duke of Alva came to Flanders, many migrated to the north. This created tensions between various groups of Anabaptists regarding doctrine, organisation, and life-style. Flemish Anabaptism was now no longer a reference to geographical location of the group but one of confessional bloc. Dirk Philips became the leader of the 'Flemish' Anabaptists, although he was not Flemish.

By the 1580s the Flemish Anabaptists had further subdivided into hardline and moderate factions, Old Flemish and Young Flemish. Haarlem in particular was a city where in the 1590s all six blocs of Dutch Anabaptism existed: Waterlanders, Old Frisians, Old Flemish, Young Frisians, Young Flemish and High Germans. Salomon van Ruysdael and, probably, his brother Isaack van Ruisdael, father of Jacob van Ruisdael, belonged to the Haarlem Young Flemish.

In 1632 most Old Flemish reunited with the Young Flemish. Subsequently these United Flemish merged with a faction of Young Frisians. By the 1640s the great majority of the 75,000 Dutch Anabaptists belonged to either the new moderate conservative bloc of United Flemish, Frisians, High Germans or Waterlanders.
