= Grainfield at the Edge of a Wood =

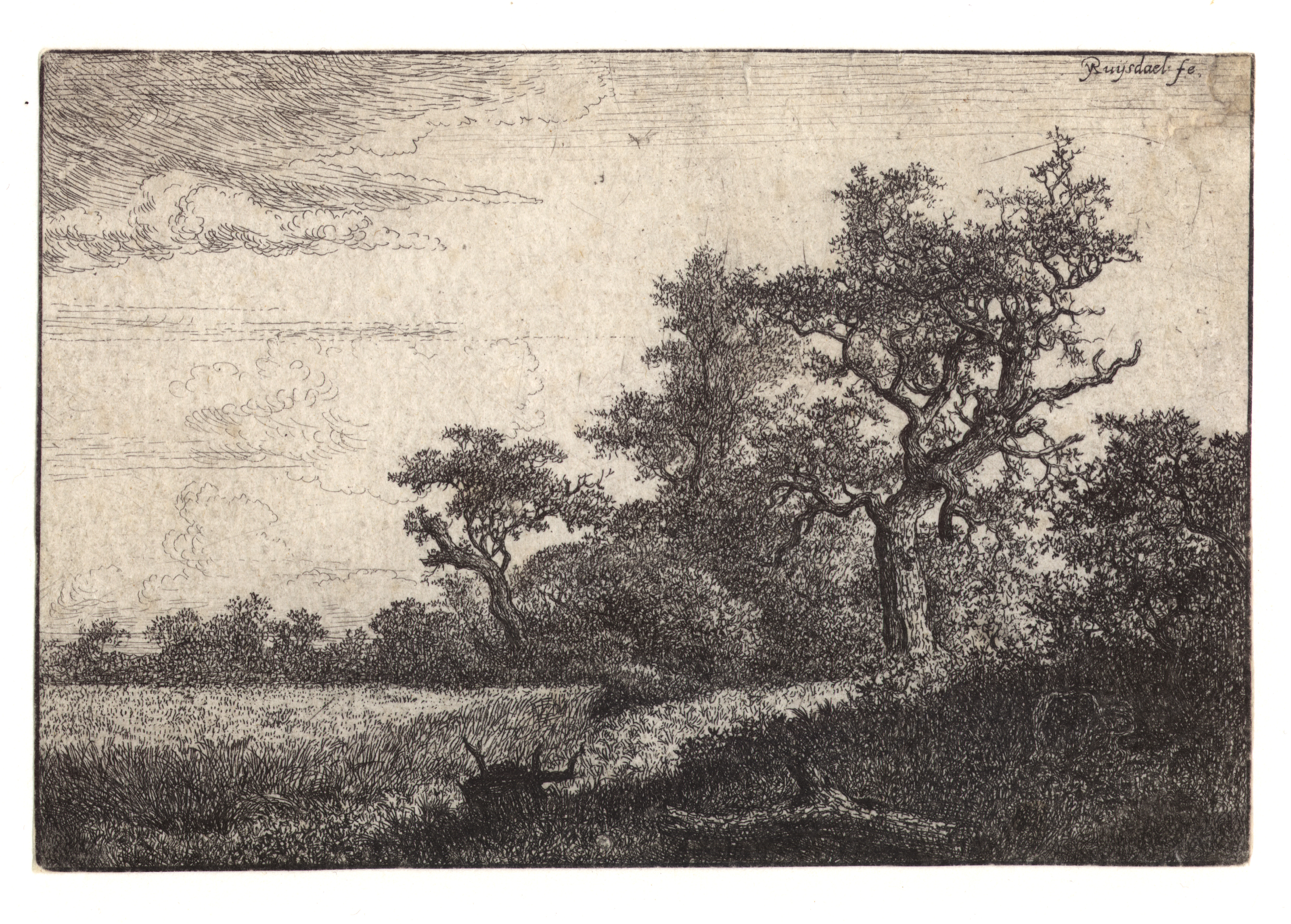
Grainfield at the Edge of a Wood also known as The Cornfield

Grainfield at the Edge of a Wood, also known as The Cornfield, is a 1648 etching by the Dutch Golden Age artist Jacob van Ruisdael. There are five versions known about the etching. The first state is at the British Museum in London. The second state, in which a few lines in the sky have been added, is at the Rijksmuseum in Amsterdam. On the later states "JvRuysdael" has been added by another hand than Jacob's.

According to art historian Seymour Slive Ruisdael's reluctance to emphasize farmers in his works of grainfields, of which there are only a handful, indicates that his intent in these works was secular, not allegorical.

John Constable made a close pen and ink copy of it, including even the signature "JvRuysdael" and plate mark.

The etching is known by various names. The etching is called Grainfield at the Edge of a Wood in Slive's 2001 catalogue raisonné of Ruisdael, catalogue number E8. Etching expert Georges Duplessis called this work one of the finest. He referred to it as The Cornfield.

== See also ==
- List of paintings by Jacob van Ruisdael
