= Wooded Dunes =

Painting by Jacob van Ruisdael

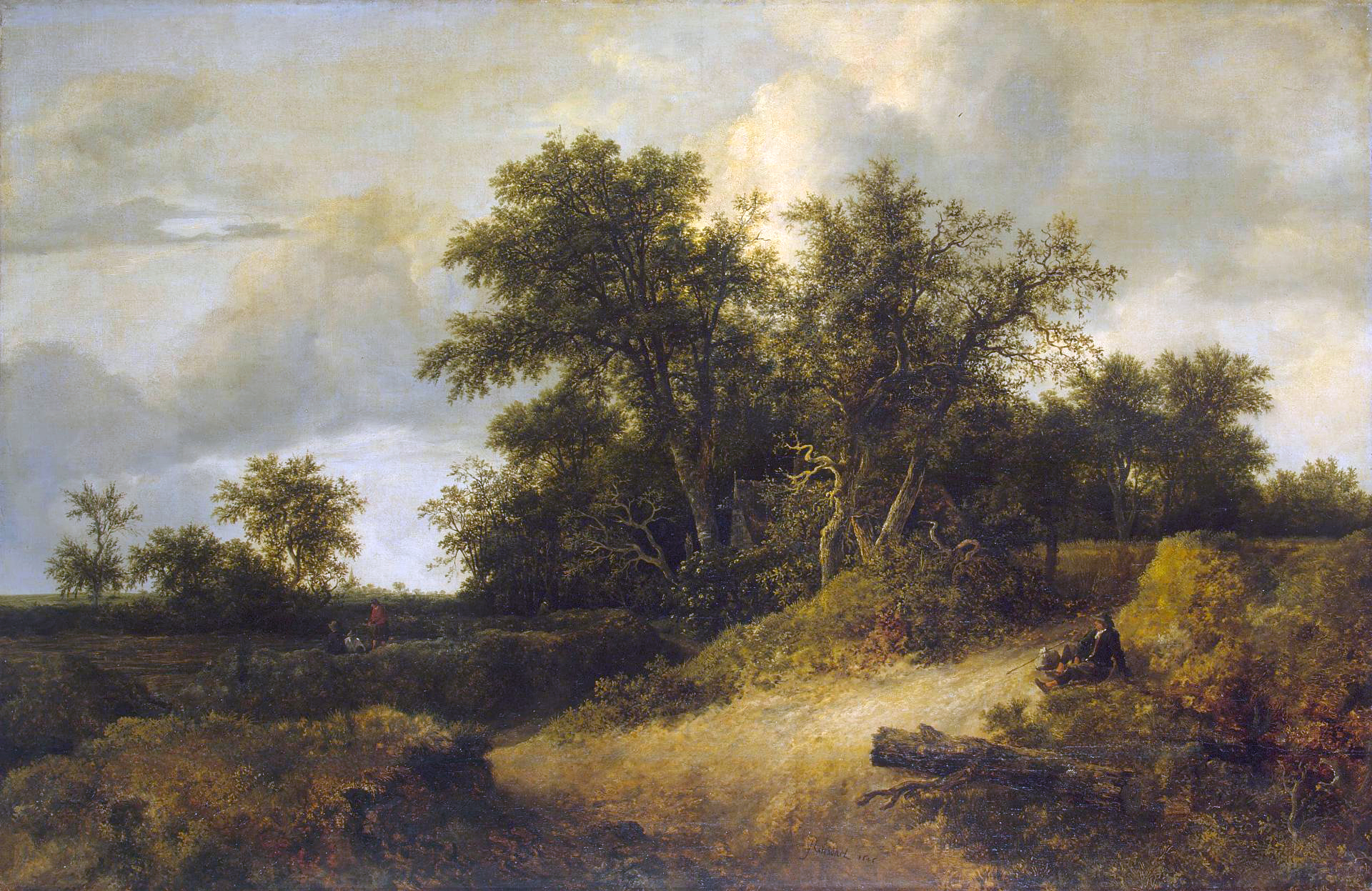
Wooded Dunes also known as Dune Landscape

Wooded Dunes, also known as Dune Landscape, Peasant Cottage in a Landscape, Wooded Dunes and Cottage in a Grove is a 1646 oil-on-panel painting by the Dutch Golden Age painter Jacob van Ruisdael. It is in the collection of the Hermitage Museum in St. Petersburg.

The painting shows a landscape of small dunes, with a peasant on the side of the road, with his bundle and stick beside him. To the left is a pool; on one bank stands a workman conversing with two seated figures; on the opposite bank are trees. There is little green in the foliage, which has been much worked on with the mahl-stick. The foreground seems to be unfinished.

This work is one of the earliest known Ruisdaels. He was only a teenager when he created it. The dimensions are remarkably large for a starting artist: 105 x 163 cm. It is signed and dated 1646. It is unknown who painted the figures. Art historian Seymour Slive doubts the staffage is of the hand of Ruisdael's father, Isaack van Ruisdael.

The painting is known by various names. The painting is called Dune Landscape in Slive's 2001 catalogue raisonné of Ruisdael, catalogue number 615. The painting is called Wooded Dunes in Cornelis Hofstede de Groot's 1911 catalogue raisonné, catalogue number 895. The Hermitage calls it Peasant Cottage in a Landscape on their website, inventory number 939. Kuznetsov calls it Cottage in a Grove in his book about Russian Ruisdaels. Finally, Irina Sokolova, curator at the Hermitage, called it Small House in a Grove in her book.

A smaller version, also dated 1646, is in het Goeverneurshuis in Paramaribo, Suriname. That one is catalogue number 610 in Slive's 2001 catalogue raisonné.

== See also ==
- List of paintings by Jacob van Ruisdael
