= Isaac Koene =

Dutch Golden Age painter (1637–1713)

Isaac Koene (1637 in Haarlem – 1713 in Haarlem) was a Dutch Golden Age painter.

According to Houbraken, he was a pupil of Isaack van Ruisdael, who collaborated with Barent Gael on landscapes (Koene) with figures (Gael).

According to the RKD, he was a pupil of Ruisdael, and a painter of landscapes and architectural scenes.
