= The Ray of Light =

Painting by Jacob van Ruisdael

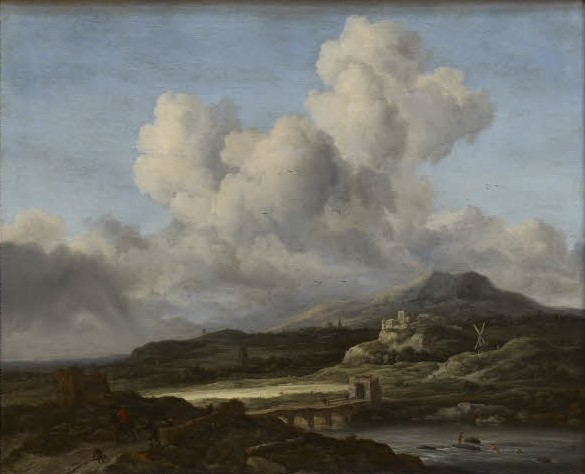
- Artist: Jacob van Ruisdael
- Year: c. 1665
- Medium: oil on canvas
- Dimensions: 83 cm × 98 cm (33 in × 39 in)
- Location: Louvre; Paris

The Ray of Light, also known as Le Coup de Soleil, (c. 1665) is an oil on canvas painting by the Dutch painter Jacob van Ruisdael. It is an example of Dutch Golden Age painting and is now in the collection of the Louvre Museum.

This painting was documented by Hofstede de Groot in 1911, who wrote; "664. THE BURST OF SUNSHINE (" Le Coup de Soleil ").

Sm. 11. A road leads diagonally across the picture from the left foreground to the right distance. On the left a horseman in a red cloak rides forward; a beggar asks him for alms. A dog runs in front. In the centre the road crosses a stone bridge of four arches over a river to a ruined square tower with an archway. The broad river flows to the right, where three persons bathe near rocks in mid stream. On the farther bank are hills, with a ruined castle half-way up the slope. To the right is a wind-mill; farther back is a village with a church tower. A ray of sunlight, breaking through thick clouds, falls on a field in the left middle distance. The figures, though ascribed in the catalogue to Ph. Wouwerman, are by Ruisdael himself. The picture is strongly influenced by Rembrandt's landscapes, especially in composition. [Cf. 788.] Signed with the monogram on the left; canvas, 33 inches by 39 inches.

Engraved by Laurent in the Musée Français. In the collection of King Louis XVI.

In the Louvre, Paris, 1902 catalogue, No. 2560; it was valued by the experts in 1816 (at 15,000 francs)".

Influences:

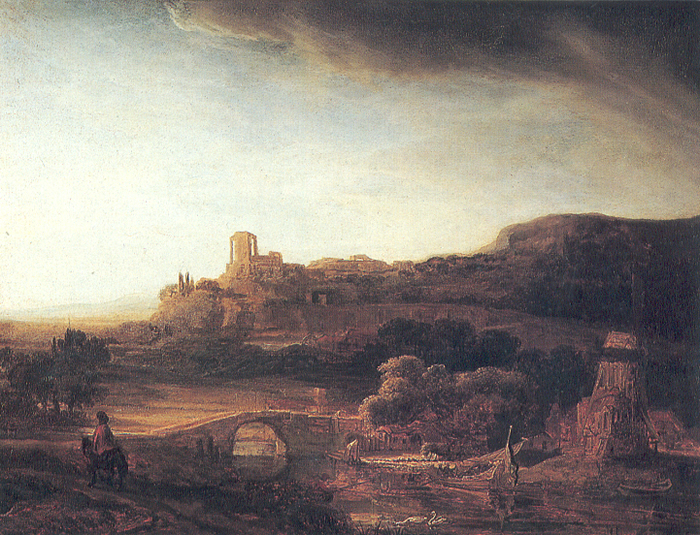
Rembrandt's River Landscape with a Windmill from the Museum Schloss Wilhelmshöhe.

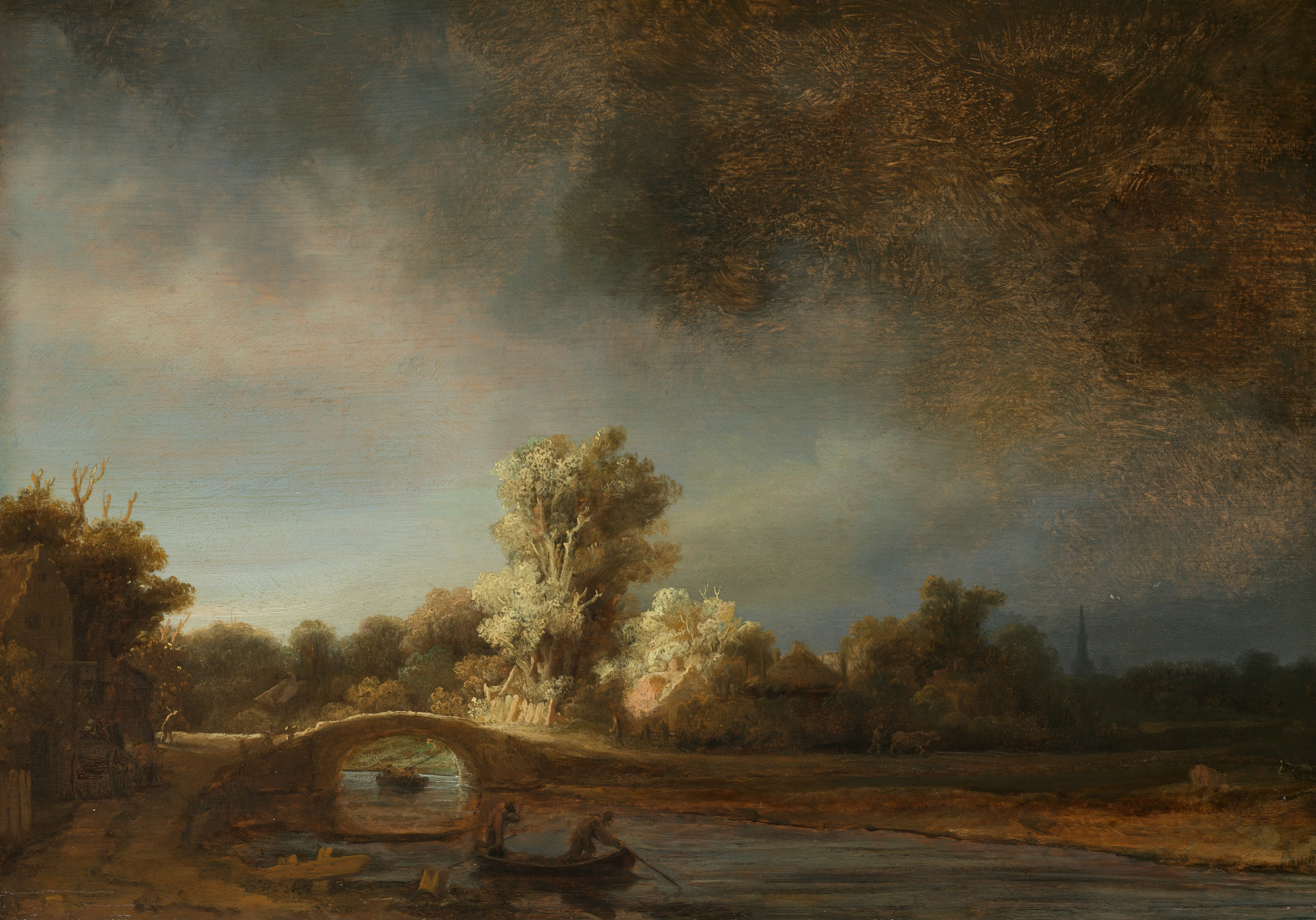
Rembrandt's Stone Bridge in the Rijksmuseum.

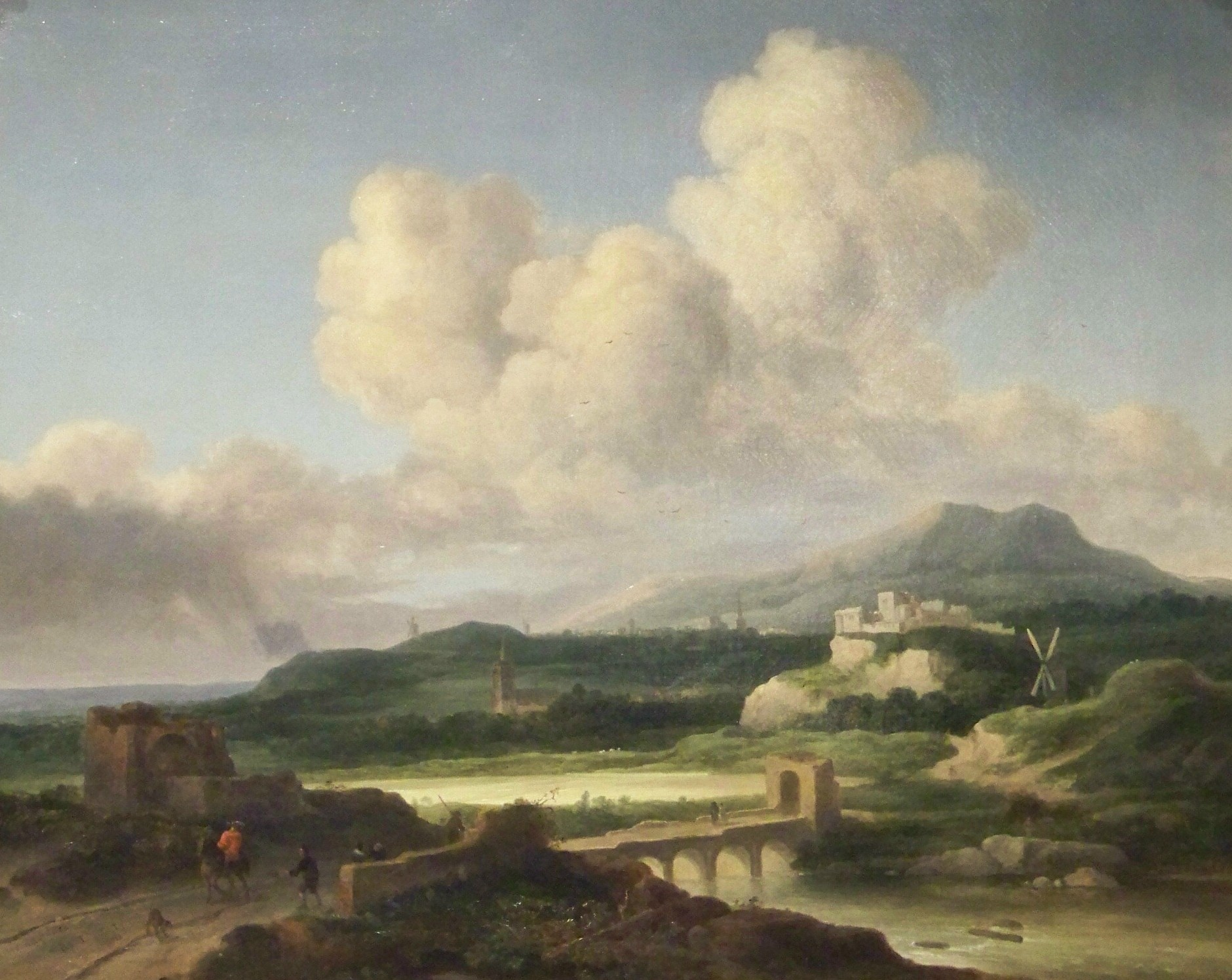
Thomas Doughty's copy from the Brooklyn Museum.

== See also ==
- List of paintings by Jacob van Ruisdael
