= Landscape with Waterfall =

Painting by Jacob van Ruisdael

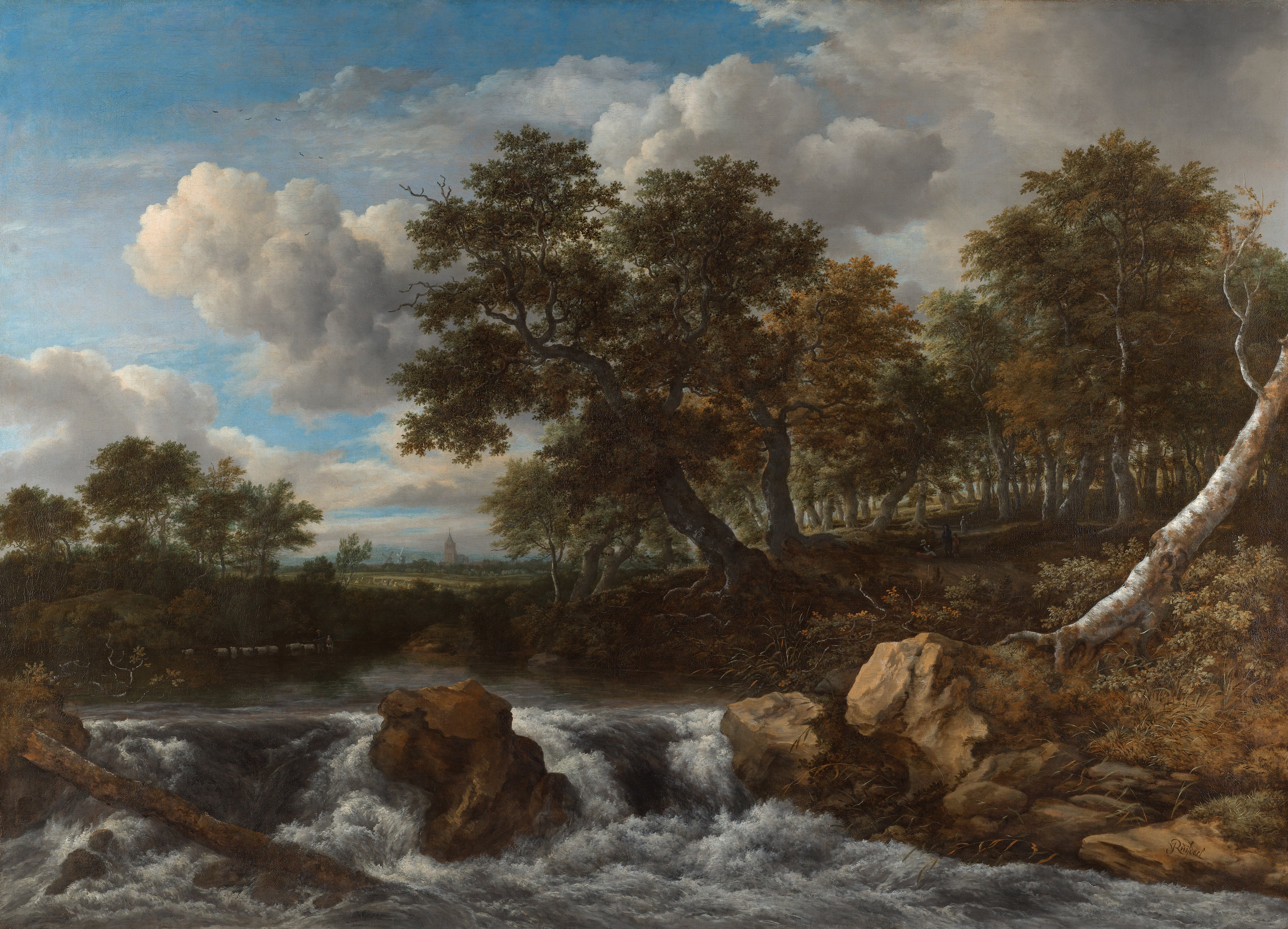
- Artist: Jacob van Ruisdael
- Year: 1660s
- Dimensions: 142.5 cm × 196 cm (56.1 in × 77 in)
- Location: Amsterdam Museum on loan to the Rijksmuseum; Amsterdam
- Website: Amsterdam Collection online

Landscape with Waterfall (Dutch Landschap met waterval, in de verte een kerk) (c. 1660s) is an oil on canvas painting by the Dutch landscape painter Jacob van Ruisdael. It is an example of Dutch Golden Age painting and is now in the collection of the Amsterdam Museum, on loan to the Rijksmuseum.

This painting was documented by Hofstede de Groot in 1911, who wrote; "198. A WATERFALL NEAR AN OAK WOOD. Sm. Suppl. 1. In the left foreground is a waterfall divided in the middle by a rock; to the left is a tree-trunk lying half in the stream. In the right foreground is a rocky bank with a birch stem bent to the right. In the right middle distance is a great oak wood, traversed by a road on which stand a man and boy conversing with a woman who sits nursing a child. To the left of the road is the stream, through which two persons apparently men drive a flock of sheep. Beyond is a wooded slope. In the centre is a view over a cornfield with sheaves; in the distance is a village with two wind-mills and a church. A fine evening, with rolling clouds and sunlight falling on the cornfield and wood. "This excellent picture, in addition to its being one of the largest works of the artist, is singularly grand and rich in its composition, combined with unusual clearness and brilliancy of colouring and the most masterly execution, justly entitling it to the appellation of a chef d'oeuvre" (Sm.).

Signed in full on a stone on the right at foot; canvas though the Amsterdam catalogue says it is on oak panel 56 inches by 76 1/2 inches. Exhibited at Amsterdam, 1845, No. 134. Bought by an ancestor of Sir Charles Blount, Bart., on the Continent about the year 1740 (Sm.). In the collection of Sir Charles Blount, Bart., who sold it to Sm. in 1836. Sold by Sm. to A. van der Hoop, Amsterdam, 1837 (for 1450). Bequeathed by A. van der Hoop to Amsterdam with his collection in 1854. In the Rijksmuseum, Amsterdam, Van der Hoop bequest, 1910 catalogue, No. 2075."

This scene is very similar to other paintings Ruisdael made of waterfalls. As a warning of the forces of nature, these often included logs or broken tree stumps as silent witness to a more flooded scene than the one depicted. These must have sold well, as most of what remains today of Ruisdael's oeuvre are waterfall scenes. Inspired by the dramatic works of Allaert van Everdingen, Ruisdael also made more Nordic versions (such as A Waterfall in a Rocky Landscape), which included pine trees and mountains.

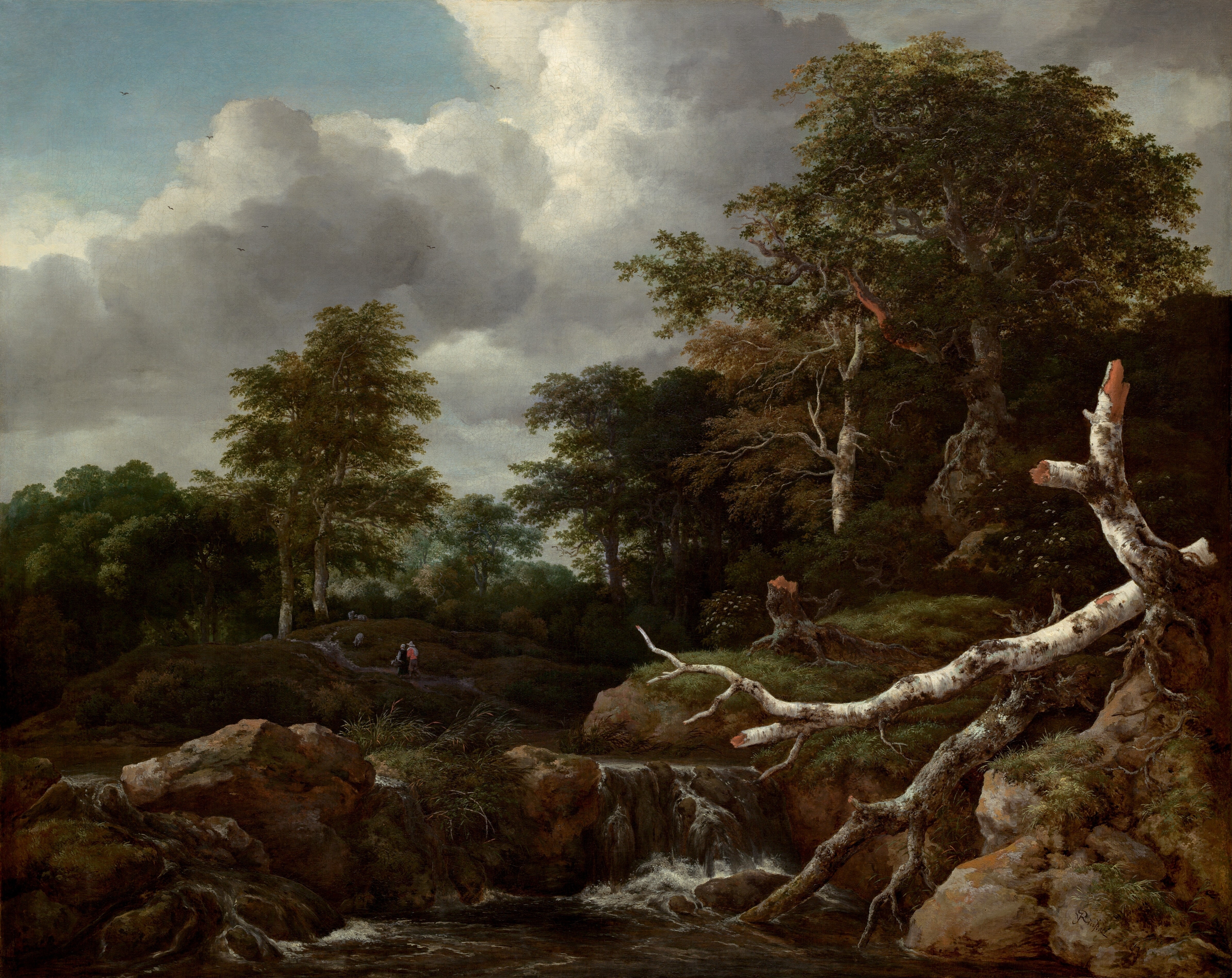
National Gallery of Art.

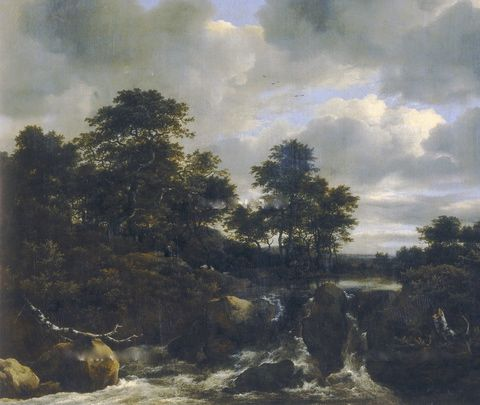
Uffizi.

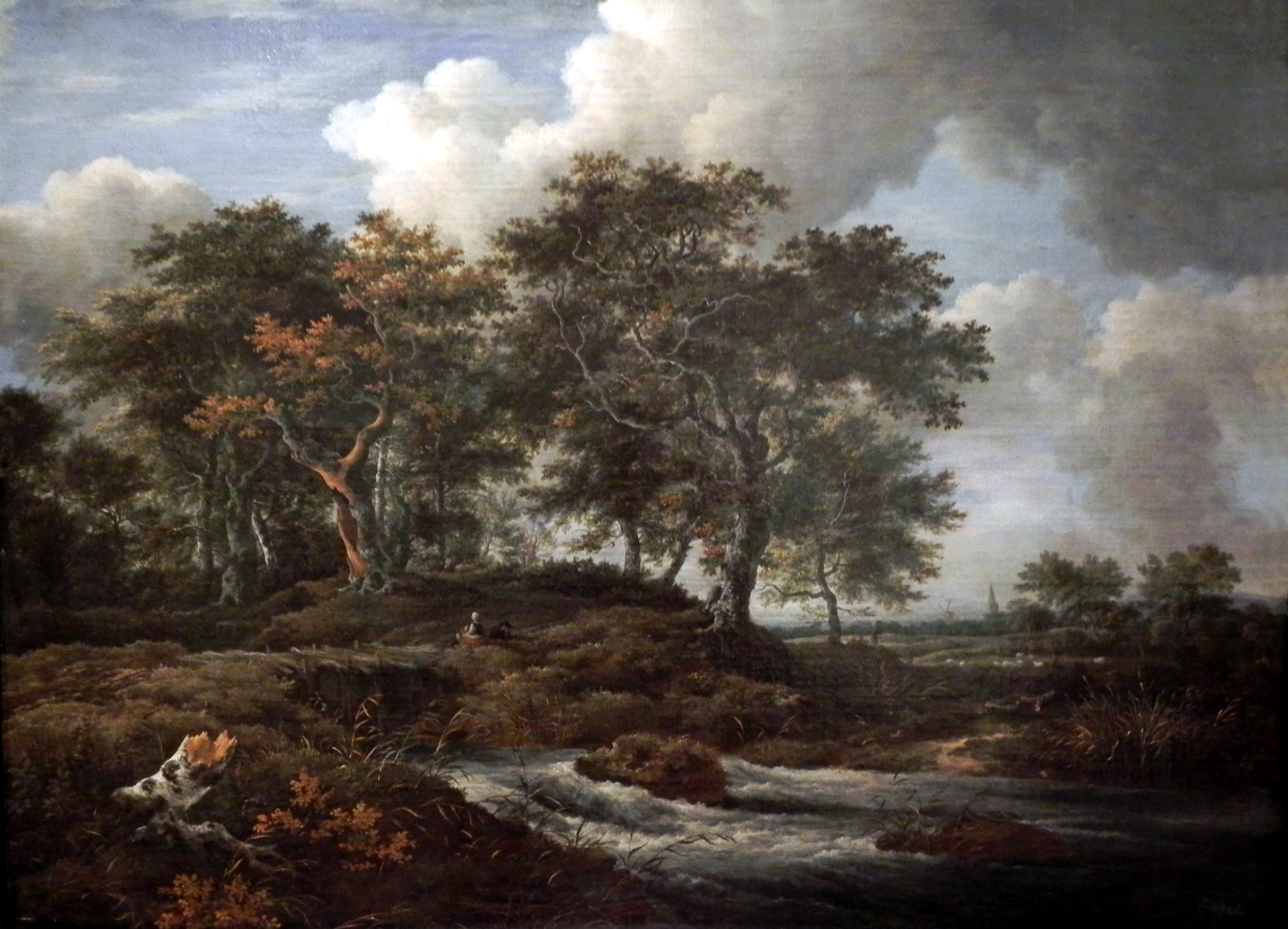
Alte Pinakothek.

== See also ==
- List of paintings by Jacob van Ruisdael
