= Waterfall in a Mountainous Landscape with a Ruined Castle =

Painting by Jacob van Ruisdael

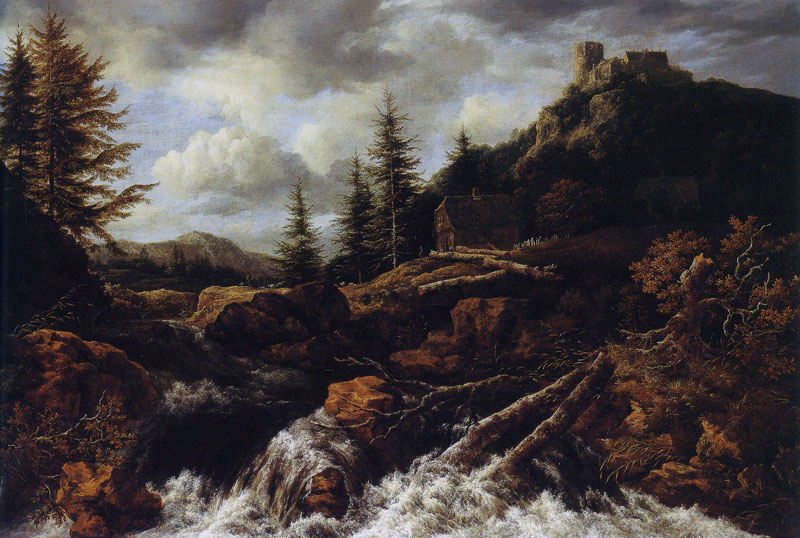
- Artist: Jacob van Ruisdael
- Year: c. 1665-1670
- Dimensions: 119 cm × 180 cm (47 in × 71 in)
- Location: The Bute Collection; Mount Stuart House

Waterfall in a Mountainous Landscape with a Ruined Castle (c. 1665-1670) is an oil on canvas painting by the Dutch landscape painter Jacob van Ruisdael. It is an example of Dutch Golden Age painting and is now in the collection of the Mount Stuart House.

This painting was documented by Hofstede de Groot in 1911, who wrote; "760. A HILLY LANDSCAPE WITH A WATERFALL AND A RUINED CASTLE. Sm. 198. A ruined castle stands on a high rocky hill to the right. In the left foreground a stream, on whose rocky banks grow firs, forms a waterfall and flows along the foot of the hill. A great fir stands on a bank; some felled trees lie near. To the right are two houses amid trees at the foot of the castle-hill. In the left distance is a mountain. In the style of A. van Everdingen. "This capital production of art is painted in a broad free manner, and possesses great force and effect " (Sm.). Canvas, 47 inches by 71 inches. In the collection of the Marquess of Bute, London, Richter's 1884 catalogue, No. 145; it was in that collection in 1835 (Sm.), and was mentioned by Waagen in 1854 (iii. 481)."

This scene is very similar to other paintings Ruisdael made in this period and these often served as inspiration for later painters of landscape.

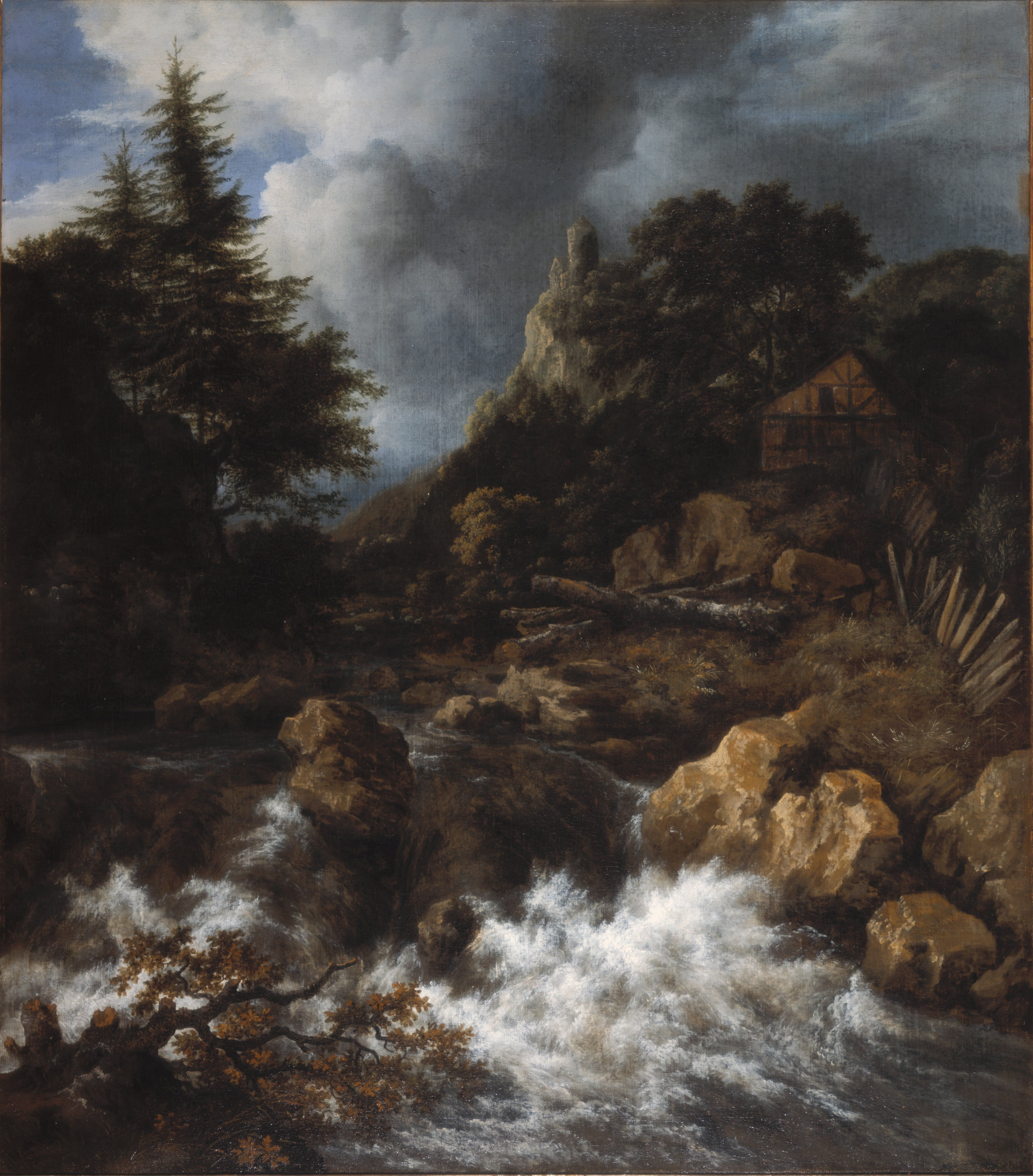
Fogg Museum.

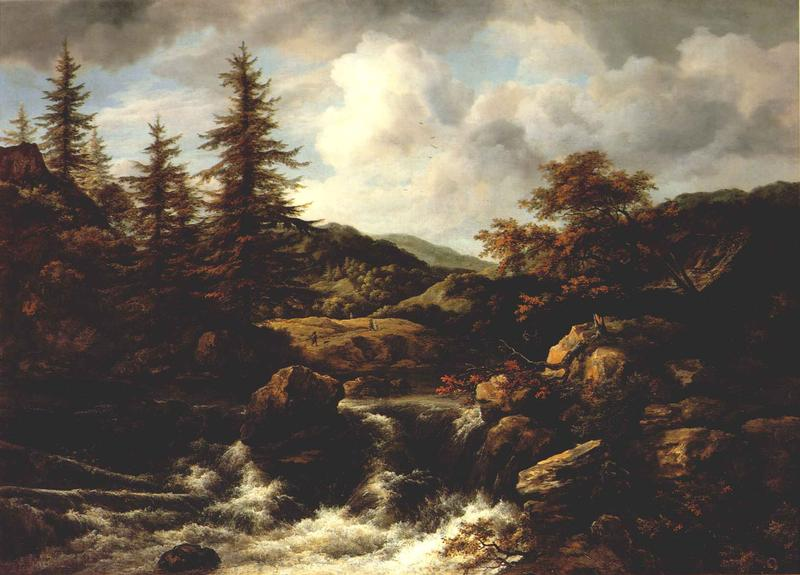
North Carolina Museum of Art.

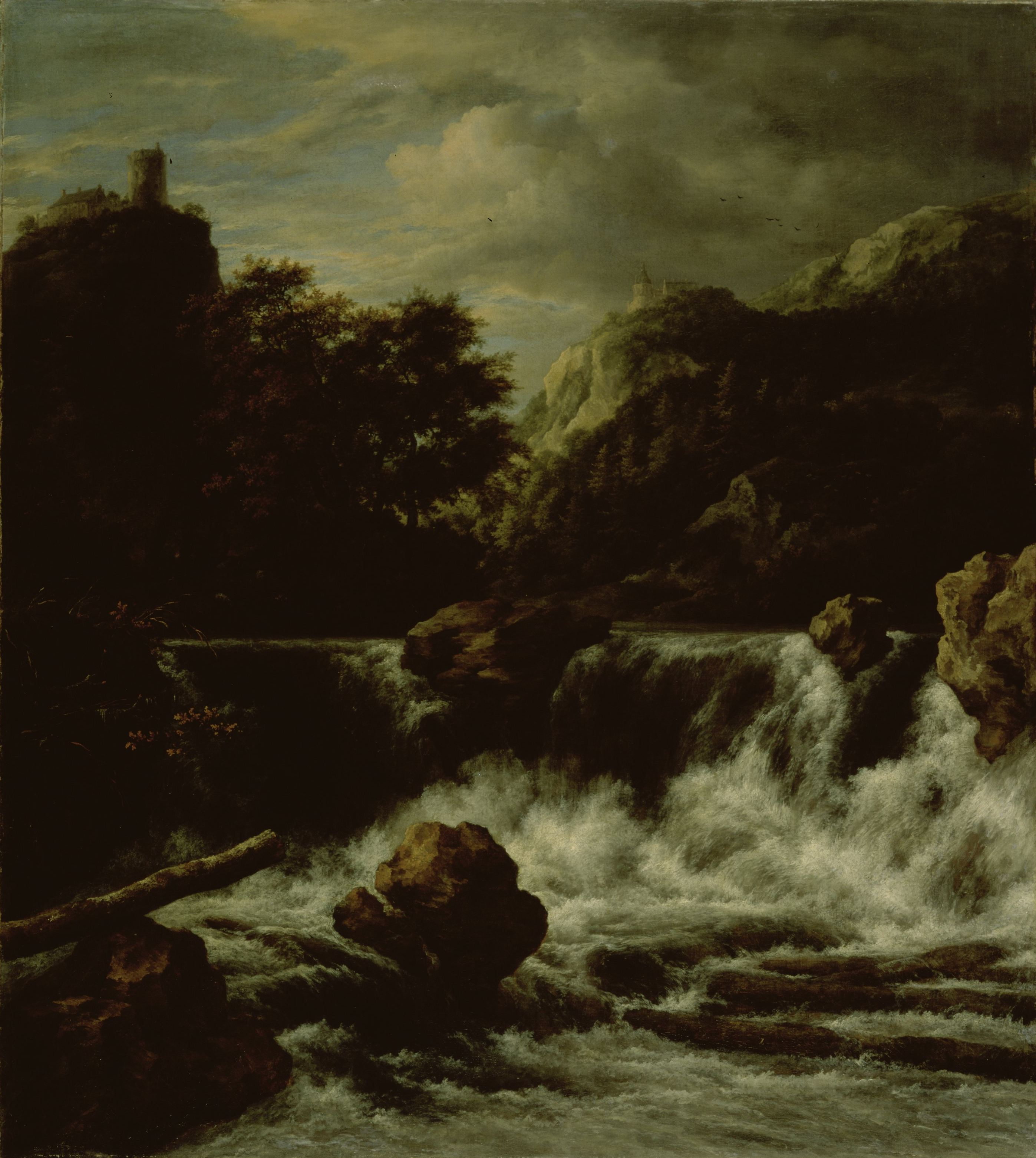
Rijksmuseum.

== See also ==
- List of paintings by Jacob van Ruisdael
