= Rough Sea at a Jetty =

Painting by Jacob van Ruisdael

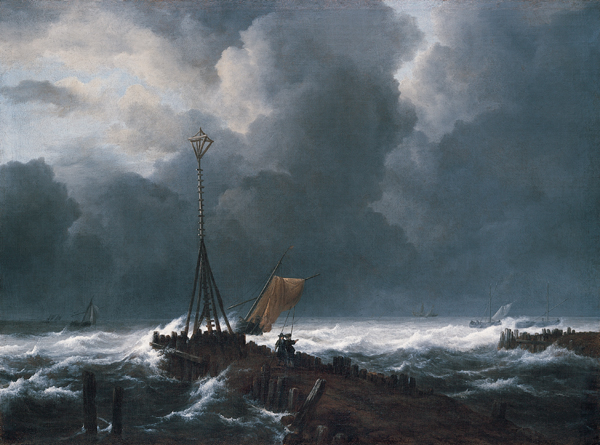
- Artist: Jacob van Ruisdael
- Year: 1650s
- Dimensions: 112 cm × 132 cm (44 in × 52 in)
- Location: Kimbell Art Museum; Fort Worth

Rough Sea at a Jetty (c. 1650s) is an oil on canvas painting by the Dutch landscape painter Jacob van Ruisdael. It is an example of Dutch Golden Age painting and is now in the collection of the Kimbell Art Museum.

This painting was documented by Hofstede de Groot in 1911, who wrote; "945. A ROUGH SEA, Sm. 2. A storm is coming on. In the centre foreground the waves dash on two jetties. Near a beacon at the end of one jetty, two men with long poles wait to help a fishing-boat which is running under full sail for the harbour. Two other boats ride at anchor near the jetty, to the right. Dark cloudy sky. A " magnificent picture " (Sm.). Canvas, 37 inches by 51 inches.

Another example, equally genuine, was in the possession of the London dealers Agnew. Exhibited at the Royal Academy Winter Exhibition, London, 1884, No. 191. Sales. Antony Sijdervelt, Amsterdam, April 23, 1766 (Terw. 519), No. 49 (250 florins, Loquet). Gerard Braamcamp, Amsterdam, July 31, 1771, No. 198 (264 florins, P. Fouquet). Paillet, Paris, July 19, 1802 (1460 francs). Bought privately by Sm. from the family of the Marquis Merialva, 1824 (for 9000 francs), and sold to the Earl of Liverpool (for £500). Sale. Earl of Liverpool, London, March 25, 1829 (£535 Lord Lansdowne). In the collection of the Marquess of Lansdowne, Bowood."

This scene is very similar to other paintings Ruisdael made in this period and these often served as inspiration for later painters of seascape.

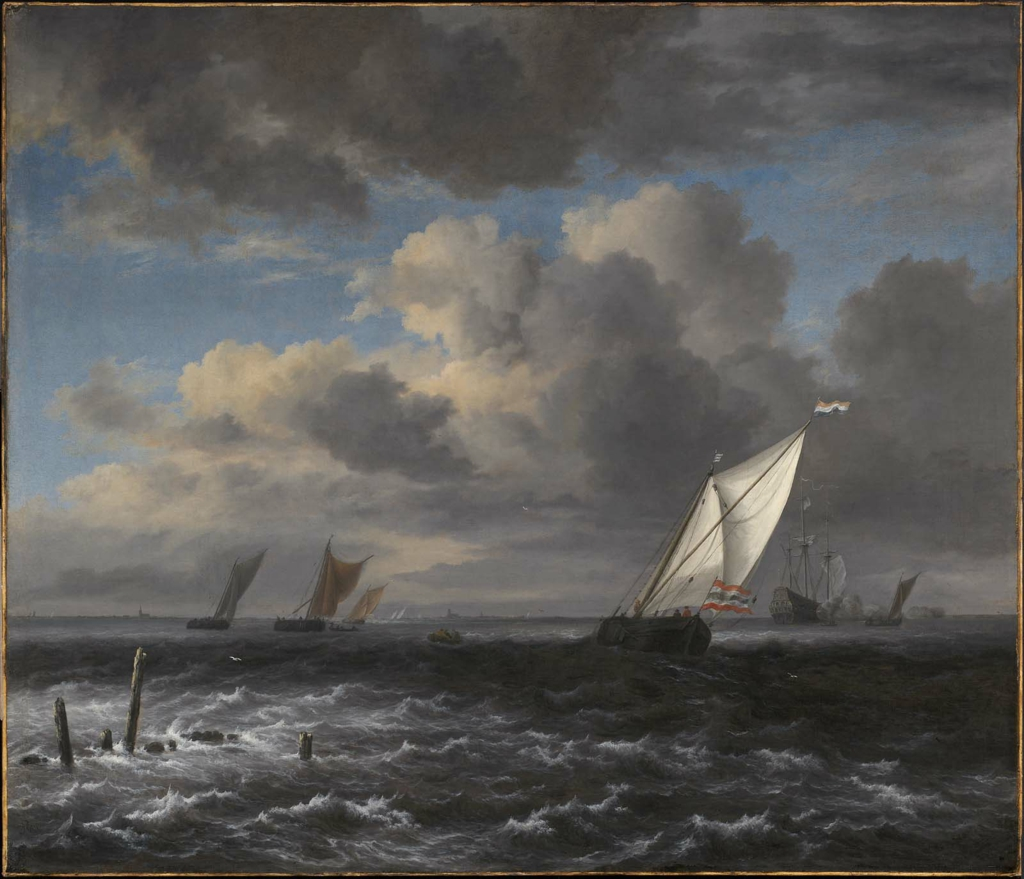
Museum of Fine Arts, Boston.

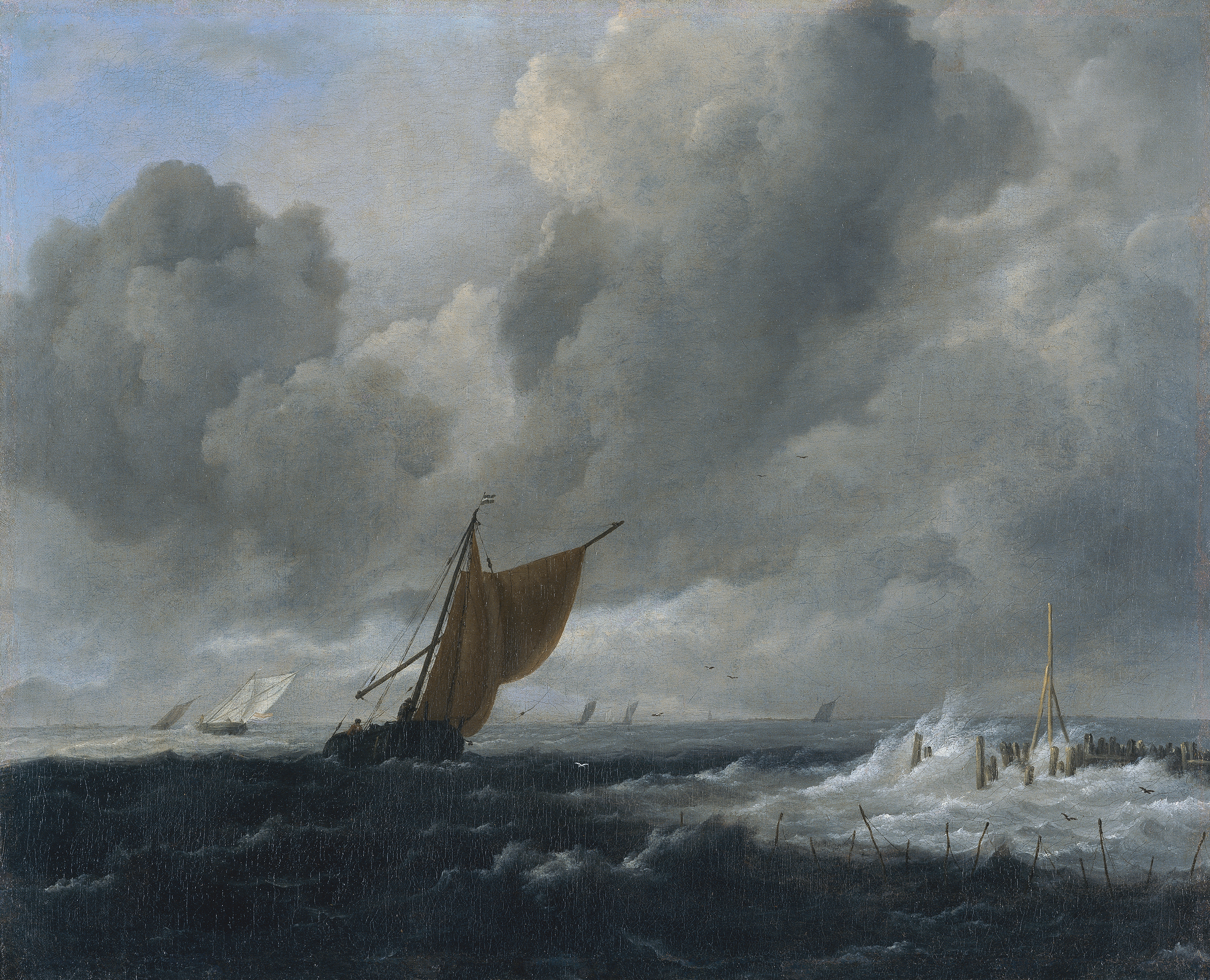
Museo Thyssen-Bornemisza.

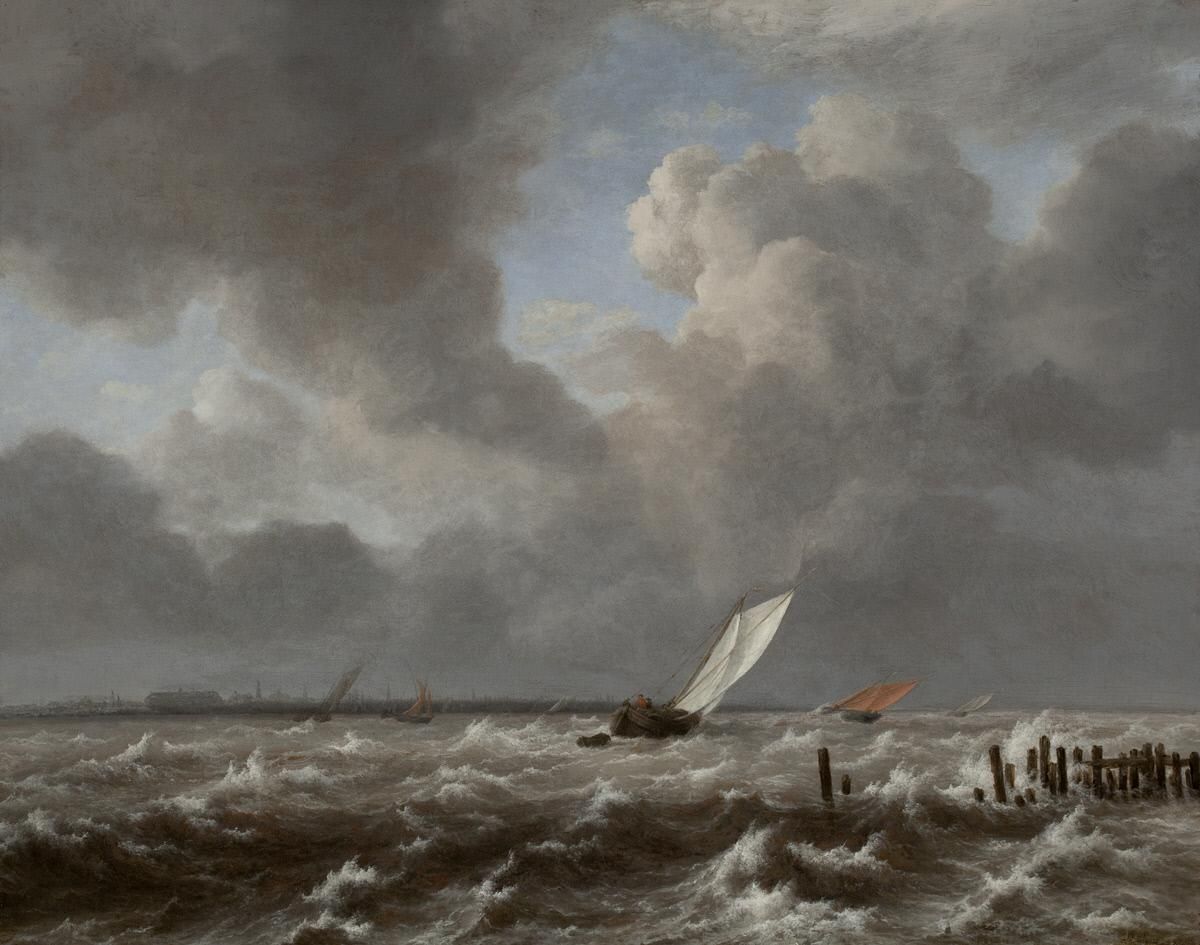
Worcester Art Museum.

== See also ==
- List of paintings by Jacob van Ruisdael
