= A Wooded Marsh =

Painting by Jacob van Ruisdael

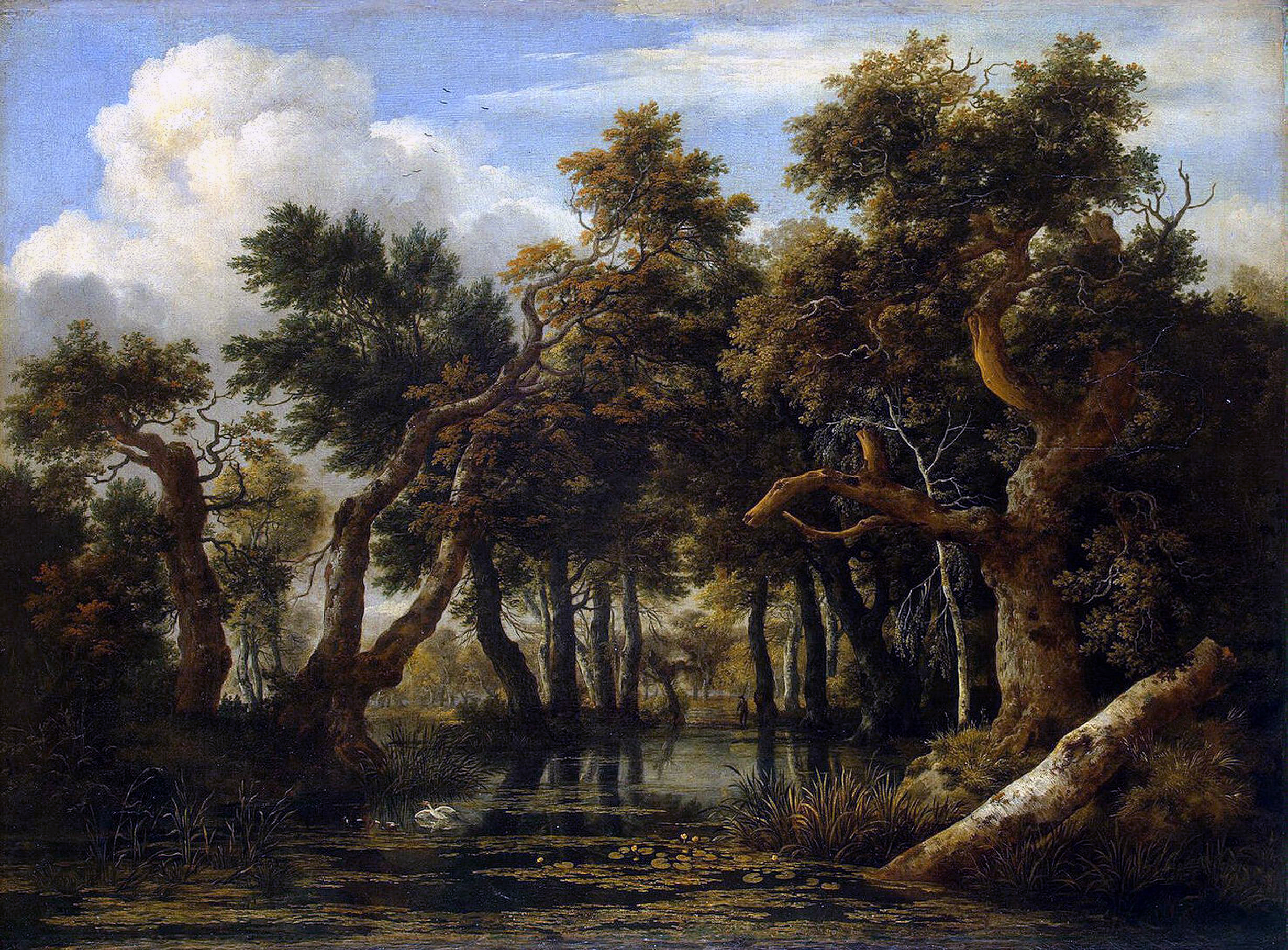
- Artist: Jacob van Ruisdael
- Year: 1660s
- Dimensions: 62.2 cm × 55.2 cm (24.5 in × 21.7 in)
- Location: Hermitage Museum, St. Petersburg

A Wooded Marsh (c. 1660s) is an oil on canvas painting by the Dutch landscape painter Jacob van Ruisdael. It is an example of Dutch Golden Age painting and is now in the collection of the Hermitage Museum in St. Petersburg, Russia.

This painting was documented by Hofstede de Groot in 1911, who wrote;

508. A POOL IN A WOOD. Sm. 306. A stagnant pool, overgrown with flowering water-lilies and other plants, extends from the centre of the distance to the foreground. On either side are beeches and oaks, reflected in the water. In the right foreground is a great withered oak; in front of it lies a felled beech, with the left end in the water. On the left three ducks fly into the bushes at the approach of a man who is seen in the distance. A genuine and very fine picture, but almost all the green has faded from the foliage. Signed in full on the left at foot; canvas, 29 inches by 39 1/2 inches. Acquired by the Empress Catherine II. of Russia. In the Hermitage Palace, St. Petersburg, 1901 catalogue, No. 1136; it was there in 1835 (Sm., who valued it at £450).

This scene is very similar to other paintings Ruisdael made in this period and these often served as inspiration for later painters of landscape.

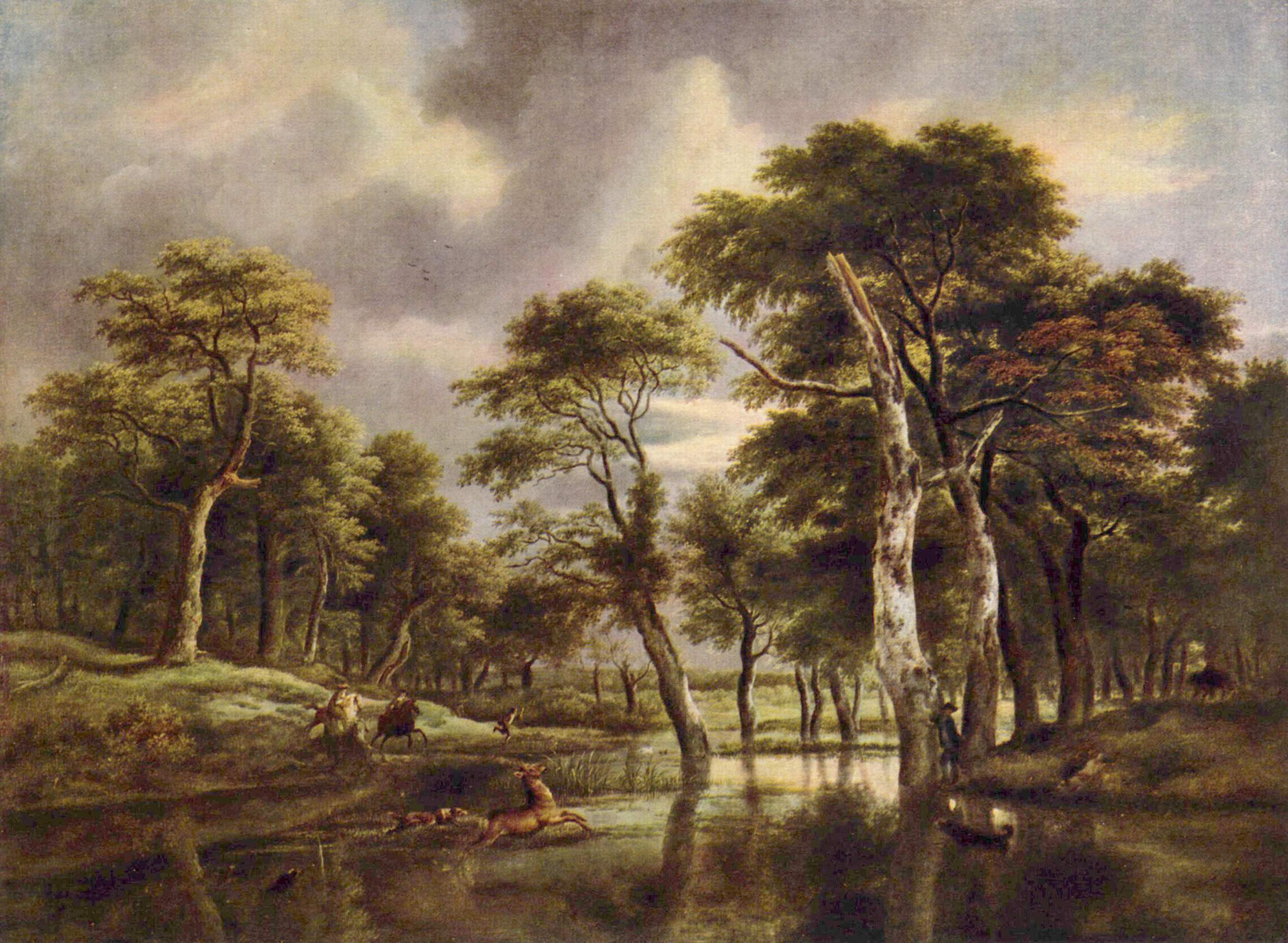
Gemäldegalerie Alte Meister.

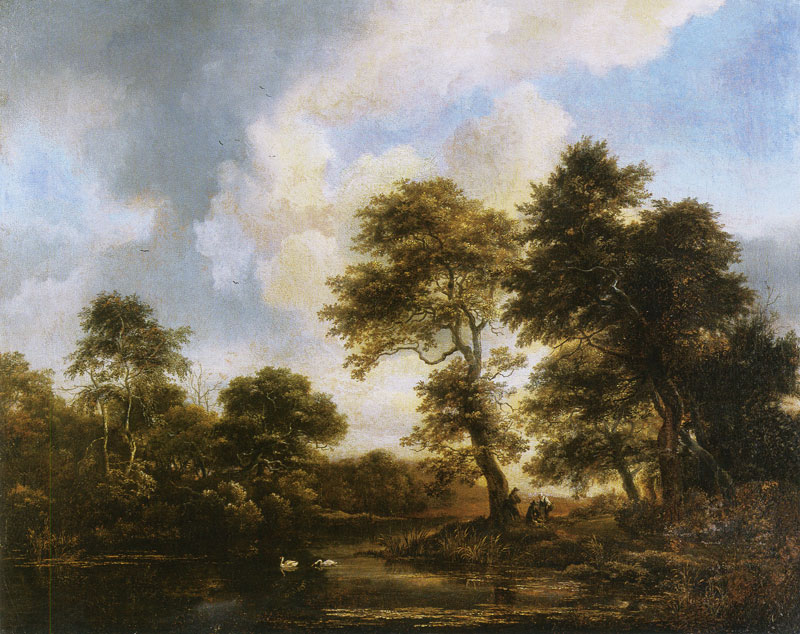
Städel.

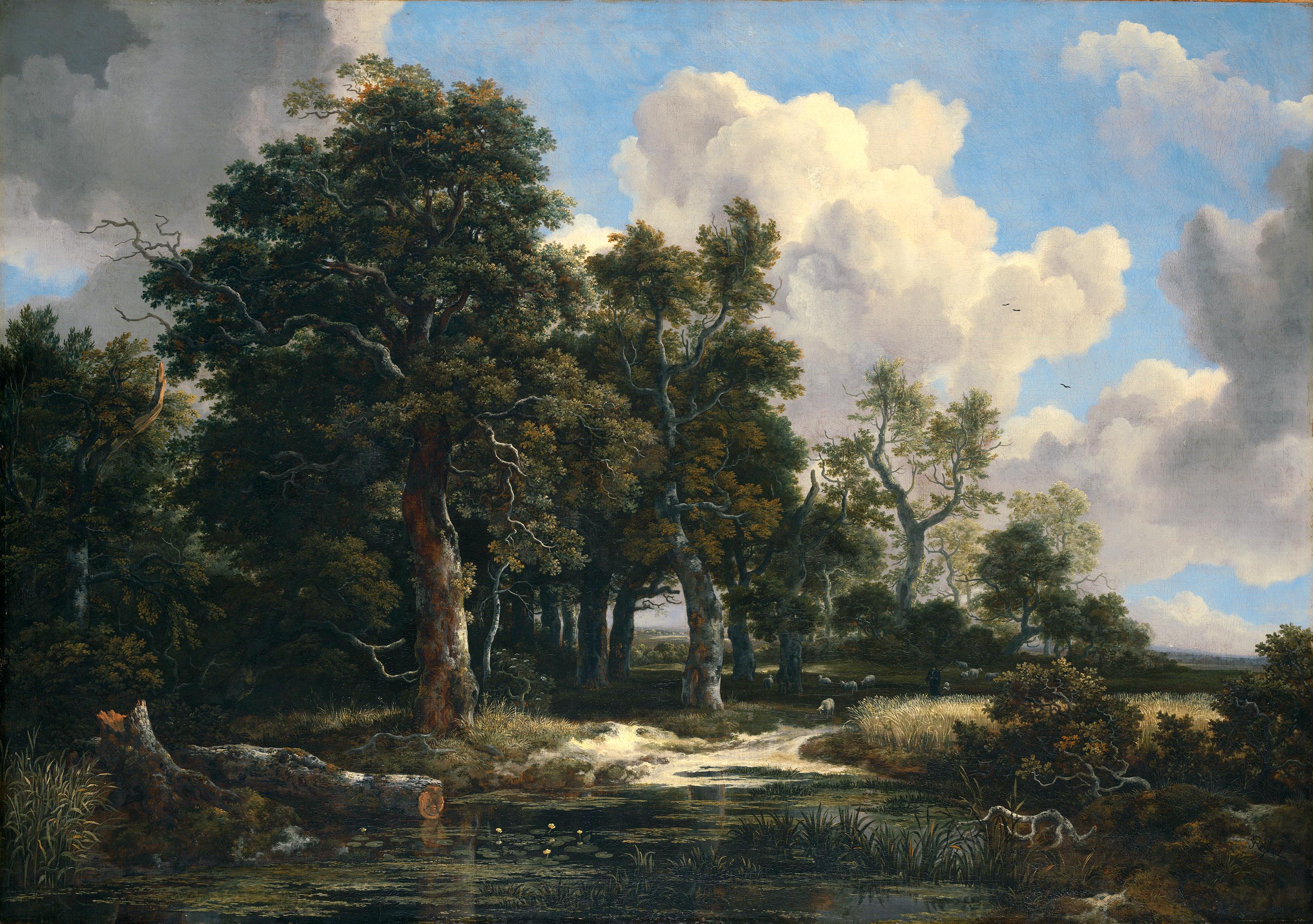
Kimbell Art Museum.

== See also ==
- List of paintings by Jacob van Ruisdael
