= Georges Duplessis =

French art historian and curator

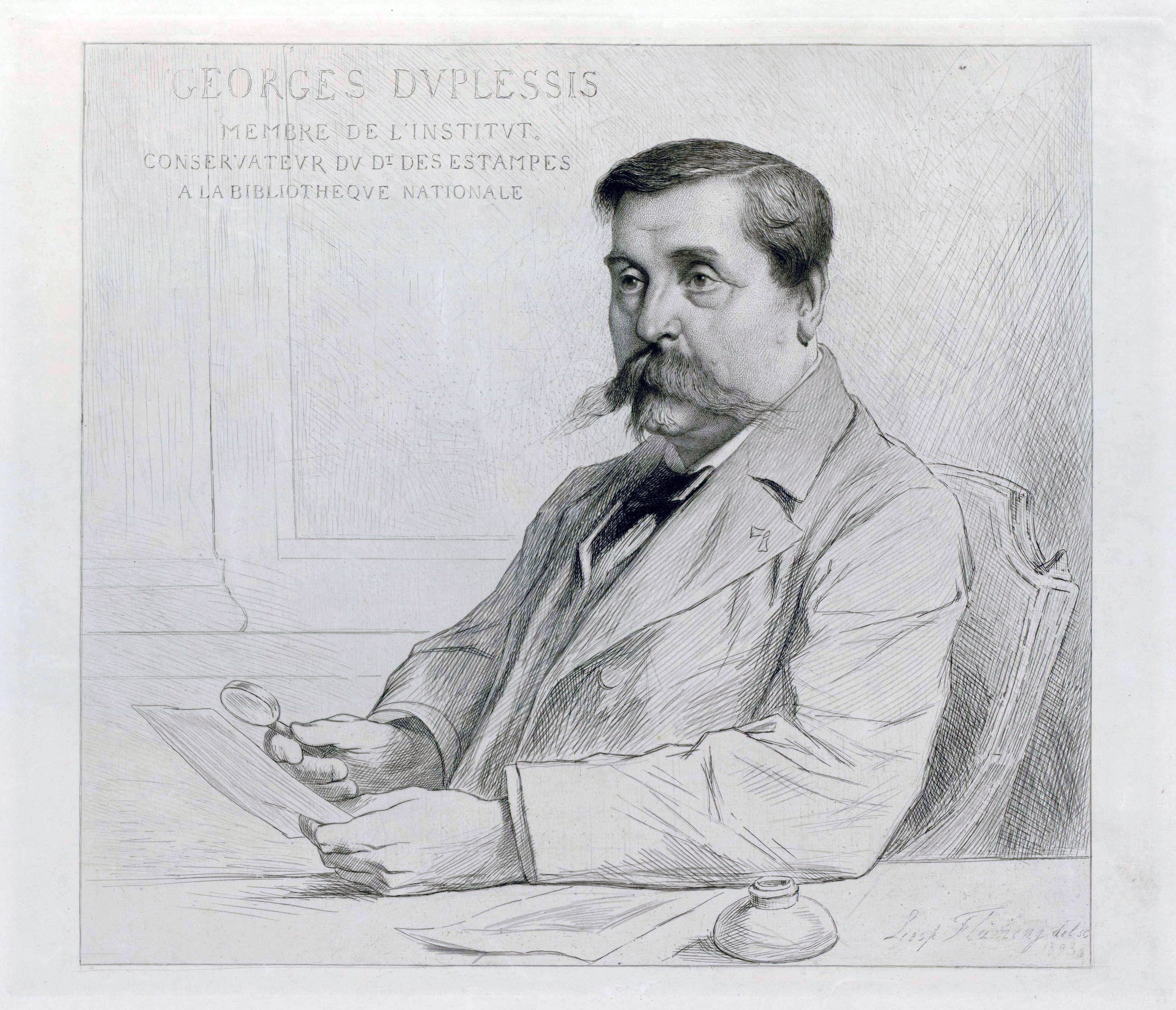
- Drawing by Léopold Flameng
- Born: Georges Duplessis; 19 March 1834; Chartres
- Died: 26 March 1899 (aged 65); Paris
- Occupation: art historian

Georges Duplessis (19 March 1834 – 26 March 1899) was a French art historian and curator.

Outside France he is best known for his book The Wonders of Engraving, translated into English in 1871. He was curator of the Print Room of the Bibliothèque Nationale in Paris.

== Work ==
- Duplessis, Georges (1871). The wonders of engraving. London: Sampson Low, Son, and Marston. Archived from the original on 2015-12-08.
