= Isaack van Ruisdael =

Dutch Golden Age painter (1599–1677)

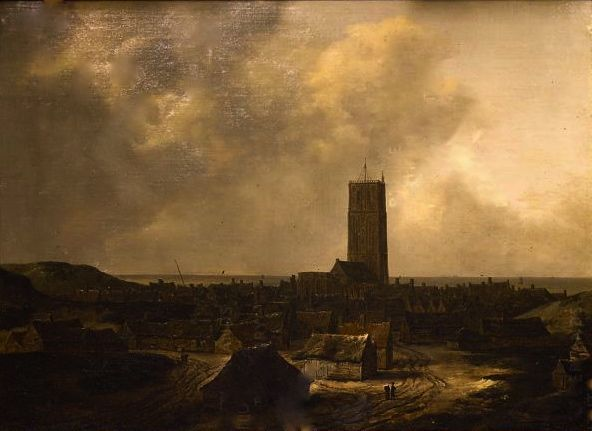
View of Egmond aan Zee, 1646

Isaack van Ruisdael (Dutch pronunciation: [ˈisaːk fɑn ˈrœyzdaːl]; (Note: In isolation, van is pronounced [vɑn].) 1599 – buried 4 October 1677) was a Dutch Golden Age painter, brother to Salomon van Ruysdael and the father of the landscape painter Jacob van Ruisdael.

== Life ==
Isaack van Ruisdael was born in Naarden in the Dutch Republic in 1599.

According to Arnold Houbraken he was the teacher of Isaac Koene, and, assuming Houbraken meant Isaack when he referred to the father of Jacob, he was a woodworker specialized in making fancy ebony frames for mirrors and paintings. Isaack sent his sons to learn Latin and medicine, and they both became landscape painters, specialized in ruis-daal, or trickling water through a dale, after their name.

According to the Netherlands Institute for Art History (Dutch abbreviation, RKD), Houbraken confused the members of the family Ruysdael. Isaack was the brother of Salomon, and they both had sons named Jacob. Their father was also called Jacob, but his name was Gooyer, not Ruisdael. Isaack and Salomon changed their name from Gooyer to Ruisdael when they moved to Haarlem, where they both became landscape painters, though it is also possible that Isaack kept doing business in picture frames, since at the time they were painting, there was a high demand for painter's panels and frames in Haarlem.

Ruisdael was buried in Haarlem on 4 October 1677.

== Works ==
Very few works are known today by Isaack van Ruisdael, but he is known for landscapes in the same style as his son, and there is a view of Egmond aan Zee and a view of Muiderpoort in Weesp in the RKD.
