= 120 Paintings from the Rijksmuseum =

Booklet of selected paintings on show

120 Paintings from the Rijksmuseum is a selection of paintings that were included in a booklet of illustrations in the Rijksmuseum Amsterdam giftshop for visitors during the years 1950–1990. It was meant as an illustrated companion guide to the catalog of the paintings on show, which included information about the +/-1,200 paintings on show. The painting River Landscape with Ferry by Salomon van Ruysdael was part of the collection of Jacques Goudstikker and was restituted to his heir in 2006. It is now in the collection of the National Gallery of Art. Various other paintings were on long-term loan from the Amsterdam Museum and have been returned, but the majority are all still in the collection of the Rijksmuseum today. Some of the paintings have been reattributed to other artists since 1956. No works by women artists were included in the selection.

== List of illustrations ==
Image	Article	Date	Painter	Catalog code
	The Holy Kinship	1495	Geertgen tot Sint Jans	950
	The Adoration of the Magi		Geertgen tot Sint Jans	950A1
	The Seven Works of Mercy	1504	Master of Alkmaar	1538B1
	The Adoration of the Magi		Jan Mostaert	1674
	The Virgin and Child with Four Holy Virgins	1490s	Master of the Virgo inter Virgines	1538V1
	The Death of the Virgin	1500	Master of the Amsterdam Death of the Virgin	1538D1
	Triptych with the Virgin and Child and saints (centre panel), the donor with St Martin (inner left wing), the donor’s wife with St Cunera (inner right wing) and the Annunciation (outer wings)		Master of Delft	1538L1
	Memorial tablet	1500	Master of the Spes Nostra	1538T1
	The Crucifixion		Jacob Cornelisz van Oostsanen	723
	Salome with the Head of John the Baptist	1524	Jacob Cornelisz van Oostsanen	722A2
	Christ taking leave of his Mother		Cornelis Engebrechtsz.	905A1
	The Calling of Saint Anthony	1530	Lucas van Leyden	1452
	The Raising of Lazarus		Aertgen van Leyden	1449D1
	Mary Magdalene	1530	Jan van Scorel	2189
	Left wing of a triptych with the donor Matelief Dammasz and St Paul (inner wing), and the Erythraean Sibyl (outer wing)	1564	Maarten van Heemskerck	1127
	Adoration of the Shepherds (fragment)	1550s	Pieter Aertsen	6
	Portrait of Sir Thomas Gresham, pendant to portrait of Anne Fernely		Antonis Mor	1673B1
	Portrait of Anne Fernely, pendant to Sir Thomas Gresham		Antonis Mor	1673B2
	The Company of Captain Dirck Jacobsz Rosecrans and Lieutenant Pauw	1588	Cornelis Ketel	1330
	Three Regentesses and the ‘House Mother’ of the Amsterdam Lepers’ Asylum	1624	Werner van den Valckert	2351
	Landscape with ruins, cattle and deer		Roelant Savery	2138
	Winter Landscape with Skaters	1608	Hendrick Avercamp	392
	The Cattle Ferry	1622	Esaias van de Velde	2452
	Banquet in the open	1627	Dirck Hals	1082
	Merry Company	1618	Willem Pieterszoon Buytewech	668B1
	Marriage Portrait of Isaac Massa and Beatrix van der Laen	1622	Frans Hals	1084
	Portrait of Nicolaes Hasselaer	1635	Frans Hals	1089
	The Merry Drinker	1627	Frans Hals	1091
	Portrait of a man, possibly a clergyman	1660	Frans Hals	1091A1
	Portrait of Maritge Claesdr Vooght	1639	Frans Hals	1088
	Woman at the Virginal		Jan Miense Molenaer	1635
	Girl in a Blue Dress	1641	Johannes Cornelisz Verspronck	2536A1
	The Old Town Hall of Amsterdam	1657	Pieter Jansz. Saenredam	2099A1
	Interior of the Sint-Odulphuskerk in Assendelft	1649	Pieter Jansz. Saenredam	2100
	Windmill at Wijk bij Duurstede	1670	Jacob Isaacksz van Ruisdael	2074
	Landscape with Waterfall	1668	Jacob Isaacksz van Ruisdael	2075
	River Landscape with Ferry	1649	Salomon van Ruysdael	2083A4
	View of Haarlem from the Northwest, with the Bleaching Fields in the Foreground	1670s	Jacob Isaacksz van Ruisdael	2071
	Pieter Schout on Horseback	1660	Thomas de Keyser	1350
	The Watermill	1664	Meindert Hobbema	1187
	A Watermill	1664	Meindert Hobbema	1188
	Landscape with Two Oaks	1641	Jan van Goyen	990
	Travellers at Rest	1671	Adriaen van Ostade	1818
	'The Skaters': Peasants in an Interior	1650	Adriaen van Ostade	1820A1
	Banquet at the Crossbowmen’s Guild in Celebration of the Treaty of Münster	1648	Bartholomeus van der Helst	1135
	River View by Moonlight		Aert van der Neer	1720A2
	Two Horses in a Meadow near a Gate	1649	Paulus Potter	1911
	Cows in a Meadow near a Farm	1653	Paulus Potter	1915
	An Old Woman Reading, Probably the Prophetess Hannah	1631	Rembrandt	2024A1
	Jeremiah Lamenting the Destruction of Jerusalem	1630	Rembrandt	2024A5
	Joseph relating his dreams to his parents and brothers	1633	Rembrandt	2024A7
	Portrait of Maria Trip	1639	Rembrandt	2022
	The Night Watch	1642	Rembrandt	2016
	The Anatomy Lesson of Dr. Deijman	1656	Rembrandt	2018
	Syndics of the Drapers' Guild	1662	Rembrandt	2017
	The Jewish Bride	1667	Rembrandt	2019
	The Stone Bridge	1637	Rembrandt	2020
	River Valley		Hercules Seghers	2198B1
	Four Regents and the 'House Father' of the Amsterdam Lepers' Asylum	1624	Ferdinand Bol	552A1
	Isaac Blessing Jacob	1638	Govert Flinck	927
	Portrait of Abraham de Potter	1649	Carel Fabritius	920
	Willem van der Helm (ca 1625-75). Municipal architect of Leiden, with his wife Belytgen Cornelisdr van de Schelt and their son Leendert		Barent Fabritius	919
	Old Woman Saying Grace, Known as 'The Prayer without End'	1656	Nicolaes Maes	1501
	Portrait of Ernest de Beveren, Lord of West-IJsselmonde and De Lindt	1685	Aert de Gelder	966B6
	The Town Hall on Dam Square, Amsterdam	1672	Gerrit Adriaenszoon Berckheyde	483
	View of a German Town		Jan van der Heyden	1170
	The Dam, Amsterdam	1668	Jan van der Heyden	1174
	The Cannon Shot	1680	Willem van de Velde	2478
	The IJ before Amsterdam	1686	Willem van de Velde	2469
	The Home Fleet Saluting the State Barge	1650	Jan van de Cappelle	681
	Still Life with Silver Ewer	1656	Willem Kalf	1320
	Interior of a Protestant Gothic Church		Emanuel de Witte	2697
	Portrait of Helena van der Schalcke	1648	Gerard ter Borch	573
	The Gallant Conversation	1654	Gerard ter Borch	570
	The Little Street	1657	Johannes Vermeer	2527A2
	The Milkmaid	c. 1659	Johannes Vermeer	2527A1
	The Love Letter	1666	Johannes Vermeer	2528
	Woman in Blue Reading a Letter	1660	Johannes Vermeer	2527
	A Woman with a Child in a Pantry	1658	Pieter de Hooch	1248
	Company in a courtyard behind a house	1663	Pieter de Hooch	1251
	A confidential chat	1661	Quirijn van Brekelenkam	626
	The Sick Child	1660	Gabriël Metsu	1556A3
	The Night School		Gerrit Dou	795
	Man Smoking a Pipe	1650	Gerrit Dou	791
	The Sick Woman		Jan Steen	2246
	The Feast of Saint Nicholas	1665	Jan Steen	2237
	Prince’s Day		Jan Steen	2235
	The adoration of the shepherds		Jan Steen	2250A4
	The Grey Horse	1646	Philips Wouwerman	2720
	Italian landscape	1656	Nicolaes Pieterszoon Berchem	468
	Family Group near a Harpsichord	1739	Cornelis Troost	2326A3
	An Amsterdam Canal House Garden		Cornelis Troost	2326A2
	Regents of the Almshouse, 1729	1729	Cornelis Troost	2320
	Portrait of Pieter Cornelis Hasselaer (1720–1797) and his Children	1763	George van der Mijn	1698
	Portrait of Maria Henriëtte van de Pol, Wife of Willem Sautijn		Frans van der Mijn	1697
	A Writer Trimming his Pen	1784	Jan Ekels the Younger	887
	Dedication of the building of Felix Meritis (31 October 1788)		Adriaan de Lelie	1434
	The Entrance to the Park of Saint-Cloud, Paris	1809	Pieter Rudolph Kleijn	1351
	The Raampoortje in Amsterdam	1809	Wouter Johannes van Troostwijk	2331
	The canal at 's-Graveland	1818	Pieter van Os	1809A2
	A Street in Old Batavia	c. 1870	Jan Weissenbruch	2624A1
	The Trekvliet Shipping Canal near Rijswijk, known as the View near the Geest Bridge	1868	Johan Hendrik Weissenbruch	2624
	Vestry of the Church of St Stephen in Nijmegen		Johannes Bosboom	584A5
	A young Woman	1863	August Allebé	12
	The Nieuwe Haarlemse Sluis on the Singel, Known as ‘Souvenir d’Amsterdam’	1871	Matthijs Maris	1519B4
	Feeding Chickens	1866	Jacob Maris	1518A5
	Arrival of the Boats	1884	Jacob Maris	1518A20
	Louis Jacques Veltman (1817-1907). Actor	1893	Jozef Israëls	1287
	Morning Ride on the Beach	1885	Anton Mauve	1533A14
	Lunchtime at the Building Site on the Van Diemenstraat in Amsterdam	1897	George Hendrik Breitner	622A6
	Girl in a White Kimono	1894	George Hendrik Breitner	622A9

== Foreign Schools ==
Image	Article	Date	Painter	Catalog code
	Helena Fourment (1614-73). The artist's second wife		Peter Paul Rubens	2067
	The carrying of the cross		Peter Paul Rubens	2065
	Portrait of Nicolaes van der Borght. Merchant of Antwerp		Anthony van Dyck	856
	William II, Prince of Orange, and his Bride, Mary Stuart	1641	Anthony van Dyck	857
	Madonna of Humility	1440	Fra Angelico	17B1
	Woman standing at the water's edge	c. 1520	Girolamo dai Libri	682B1
	Portrait of Giuliano Giamberti da Sangallo		Piero di Cosimo	1875B2
	Portrait of a young woman facing left		Giovanni Ambrogio de Predis	1920B1
	Christ with the Adulterous Woman	1550	Tintoretto	2302E2
	The Casino		Pietro Longhi	1481B1
	Christ on the Cross		El Greco	1001B1
	Portrait of Don Ramón Satué	1823	Francisco Goya	988B1
