= Isaac Blessing Jacob =

Isaac Blessing Jacob may refer to:

- Isaac Blessing Jacob (Murillo), a 1665–1670 oil on canvas painting by Bartolomé Esteban Murillo
- Isaac Blessing Jacob (Gerbrand van den Eeckhout), a 1642 painting by Gerbrand van den Eeckhout
- Isaac Blessing Jacob (Govert Flinck), a 1638 oil on canvas painting by Govert Flinck
- Isaac Blessing Jacob (Stom), a c. 1636 oil on canvas painting by Matthias Stom
