= Three Regentesses of the Leprozenhuis of Amsterdam =

Group portrait by Ferdinand Bol

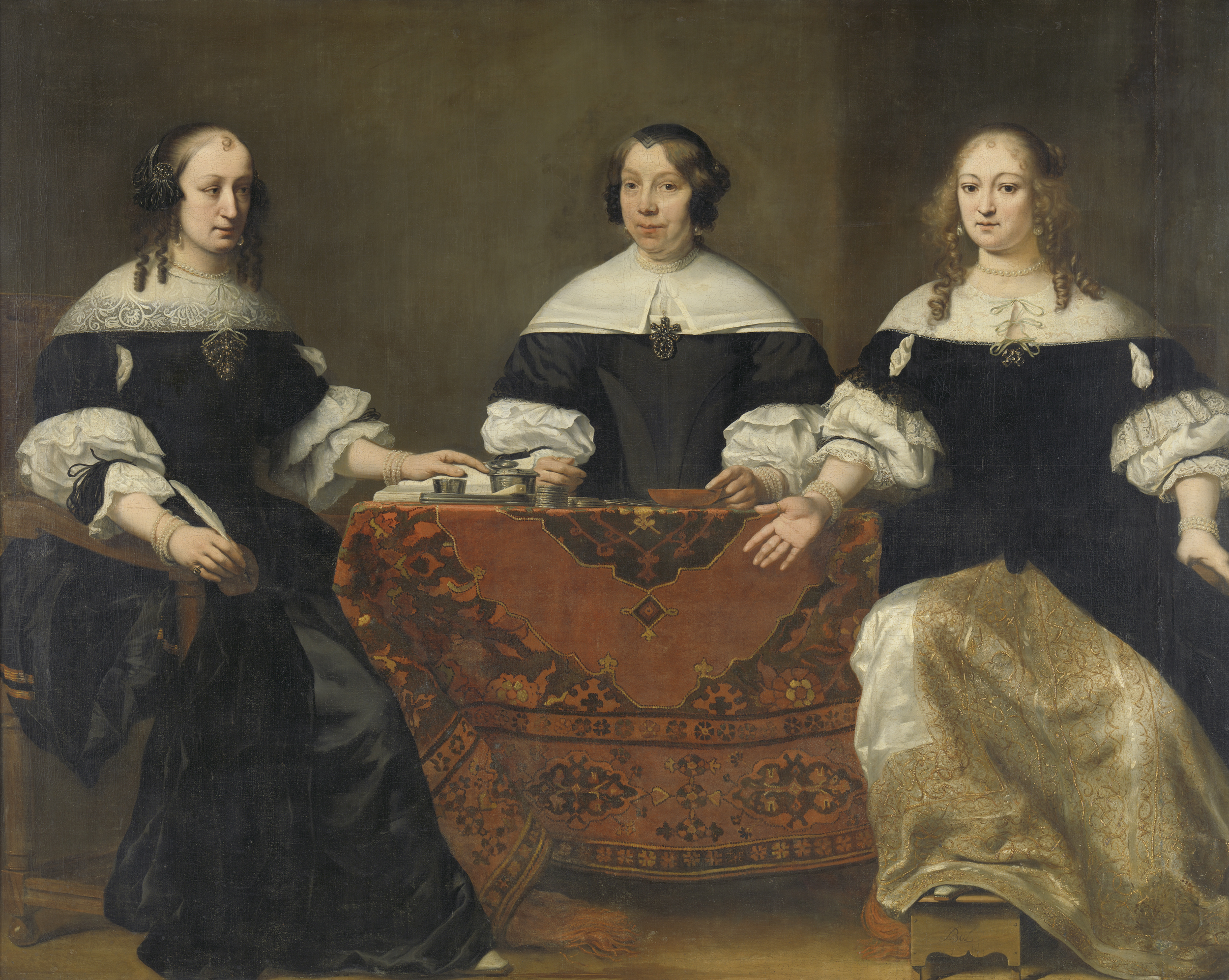
- Artist: Ferdinand Bol
- Year: c. 1668
- Medium: Oil on canvas
- Dimensions: 170 cm × 208 cm (67 in × 82 in)
- Location: Rijksmuseum, Amsterdam

Three Regentesses of the Leprozenhuis of Amsterdam is a group portrait by the Dutch painter Ferdinand Bol representing three regentesses of the leper colony of Amsterdam, painted c. 1668. The painting is held in the Rijksmuseum in Amsterdam.

== History and description ==
The Sint Anthonisgasthuis was a proveniers' house outside the city walls of Amsterdam, where since around 1490 onwards lepers were cared for and it was also called Leprozenhuis (The Leper House). The Leper House was governed by four regents and three regentesses, who were appointed by the mayors. The gentlemen were in charge of general management, the ladies were responsible for household management, including supervision of servants and purchasing. There was regular disagreement between the two groups when the regents wanted control over household affairs.

Ferdinand Bol, after working in Rembrandt's studio, established himself as an independent painter in 1641 and became a successful portraitist. In 1649, Bol painted the regents of the Leprozenhuis and around 1668 the regentesses. The paintings fit into a long tradition of painting the likenesses of administrators. Over the years, the Leprozenhuis had several regent paintings created by several artists, like, among others, Arnold Boonen, Jacob Ochtervelt and Werner van den Valckert. The latter had painted a depiction of three regentesses and the inner mother of the Leprozenhuis in Amsterdam (1624) more than forty years earlier, Three Regentesses and the Binnenmoeder of the Leprozenhuis of Amsterdam.

Bol chose the same design as Van de Valckert for the current painting: the ladies are sitting at the table, with writing utensils and coins on top of it as a symbol of their function. Van de Valckert referred in the background to the parable of the rich man and Lazarus. Bol opted for a neutral background, so that all the attention is focused on the regentesses.

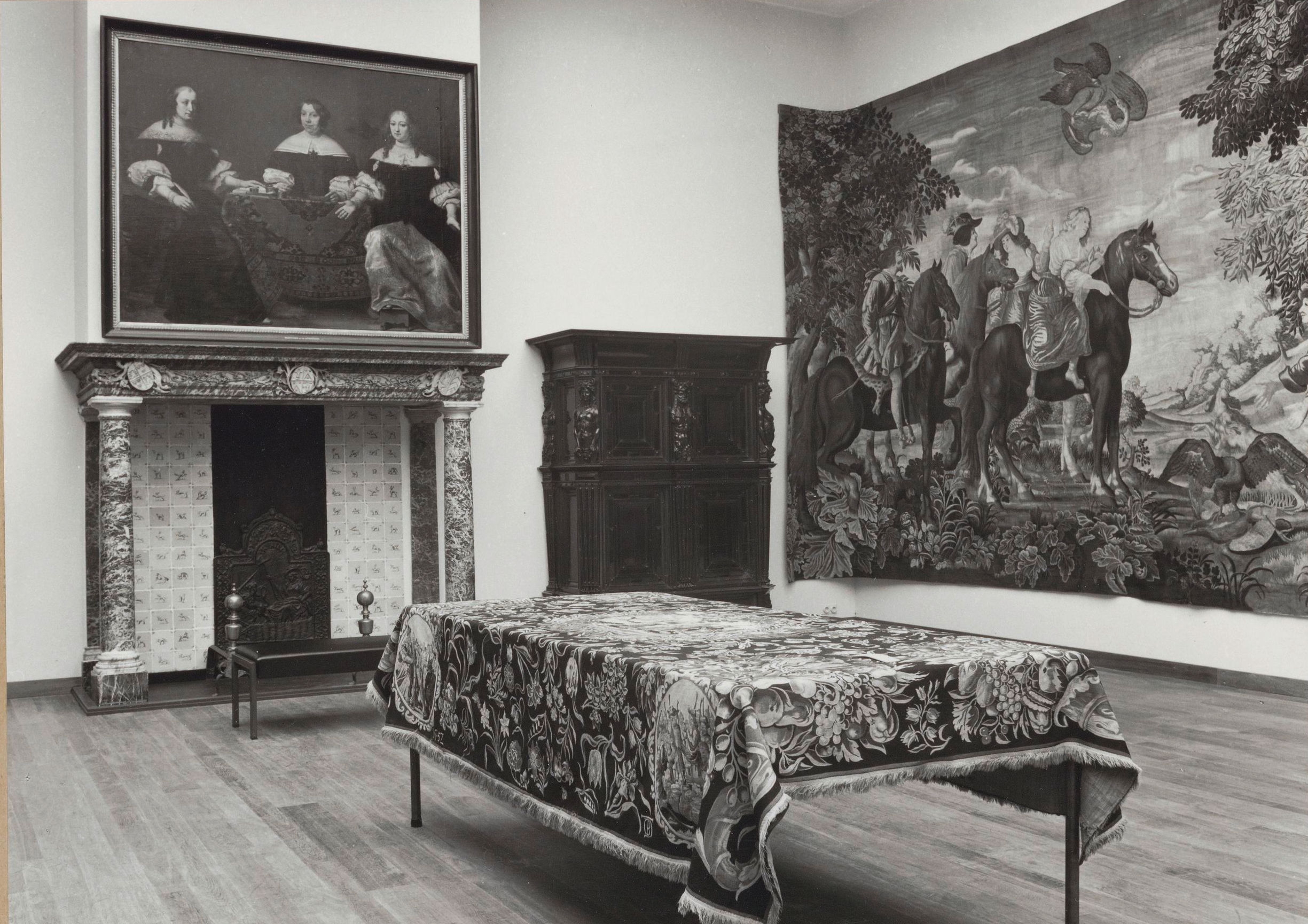
The painting and the original fireplace in the Rijskmuseum, in 1962

The painting was hung in the Leprozenhuis above a mantelpiece that was made in the same period. The frieze of the marbled mantelpiece is decorated with flowers and vines. In between, oval coats of arms have been placed in relief, with which the regentesses can be identified. From left to right, these are the coats of arms of Clara Abba, Elisabeth van Duijnen and Agatha Munter. It appears that the outer ladies or their coats of arms have been switched. Van Duijnen is rightly depicted as treasurer, but Munter was the secretary of the trio.

The painting depicts the three women, two of them in full-length, sitting at a table covered with oriental cloth. The women are wearing dresses with puff sleeves and lace, and a flat collar. They all wear pearl necklaces, bracelets and earrings. The woman in the middle wears a widow's hood. There is an inkstand and coins on the table. The lady on the right has placed her foot on a small stool, on which the painter's signature can be read.

== Provenance ==
When the number of lepers declined at the end of the 17th century, people with other conditions were also admitted. In 1759, proveniers were again admitted to the guest house. After the Poor Law of 1854, the municipality did not want to be responsible for the proveniers and the house closed in 1860. Because two residents were obstructive, it took until 1866 before the estate could be liquidated. The buildings were subsequently demolished. Various parts of the inventory, including this painting and the mantelpiece, were loaned by the municipality of Amsterdam in 1885 to the Rijksmuseum, which opened that year.
