= River Landscape with Ferry =

1649 painting by Salomon van Ruysdael

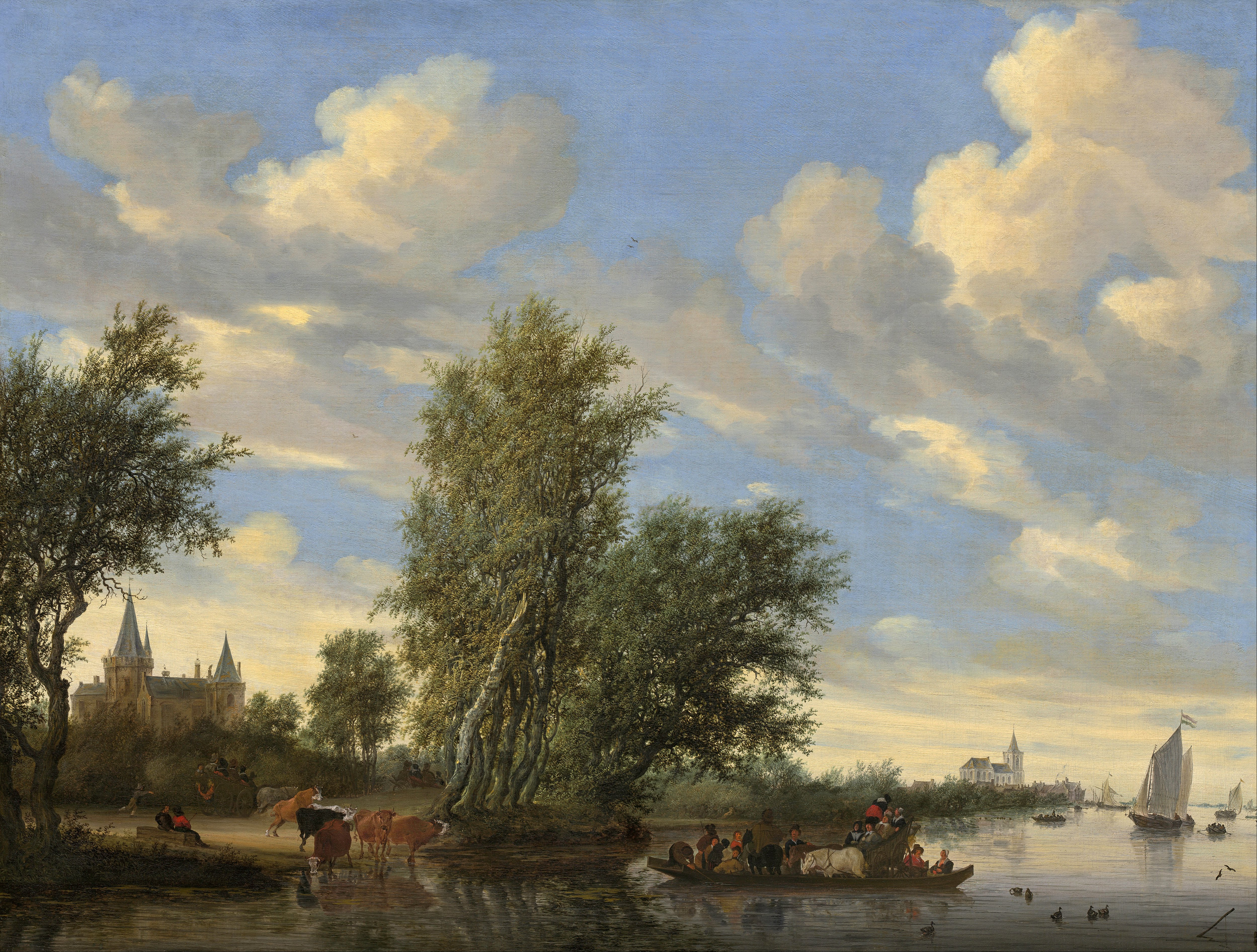
- Artist: Salomon van Ruysdael
- Year: 1649
- Dimensions: 101.5 cm × 134.8 cm (40.0 in × 53.1 in)
- Location: National Gallery of Art; Washington D.C.

River Landscape with Ferry (1649) is an oil on canvas painting by the Dutch landscape painter Salomon van Ruysdael. It is an example of Dutch Golden Age painting and is now in the collection of the National Gallery of Art in Washington D.C.. This painting was owned by Jacques Goudstikker and was restituted to his heirs in 2006.

Jacques Goudstikker was a Jewish art dealer whose works were seized and taken to Germany after his death as part of war booty. The painting was restituted to the Netherlands after the war (RCE). It was lent by the RCE to various museums on long-term loans before being given to the Rijksmuseum in 1960, where it had featured in its Gallery of Honor for years. The painting was selected as one of 120 highlights in the booklet 120 Paintings from the Rijksmuseum.

In 2006 it was finally restituted to the Goudstikker heirs and since 2007 it has been part of the collection of the National Gallery of Art. It was part of an exhibition Reclaimed: paintings from the collection of Jacques Goudstikker in 2008.

This scene is similar to other river landscape paintings Ruisdael made in this period and these often served as inspiration for later painters of landscape.

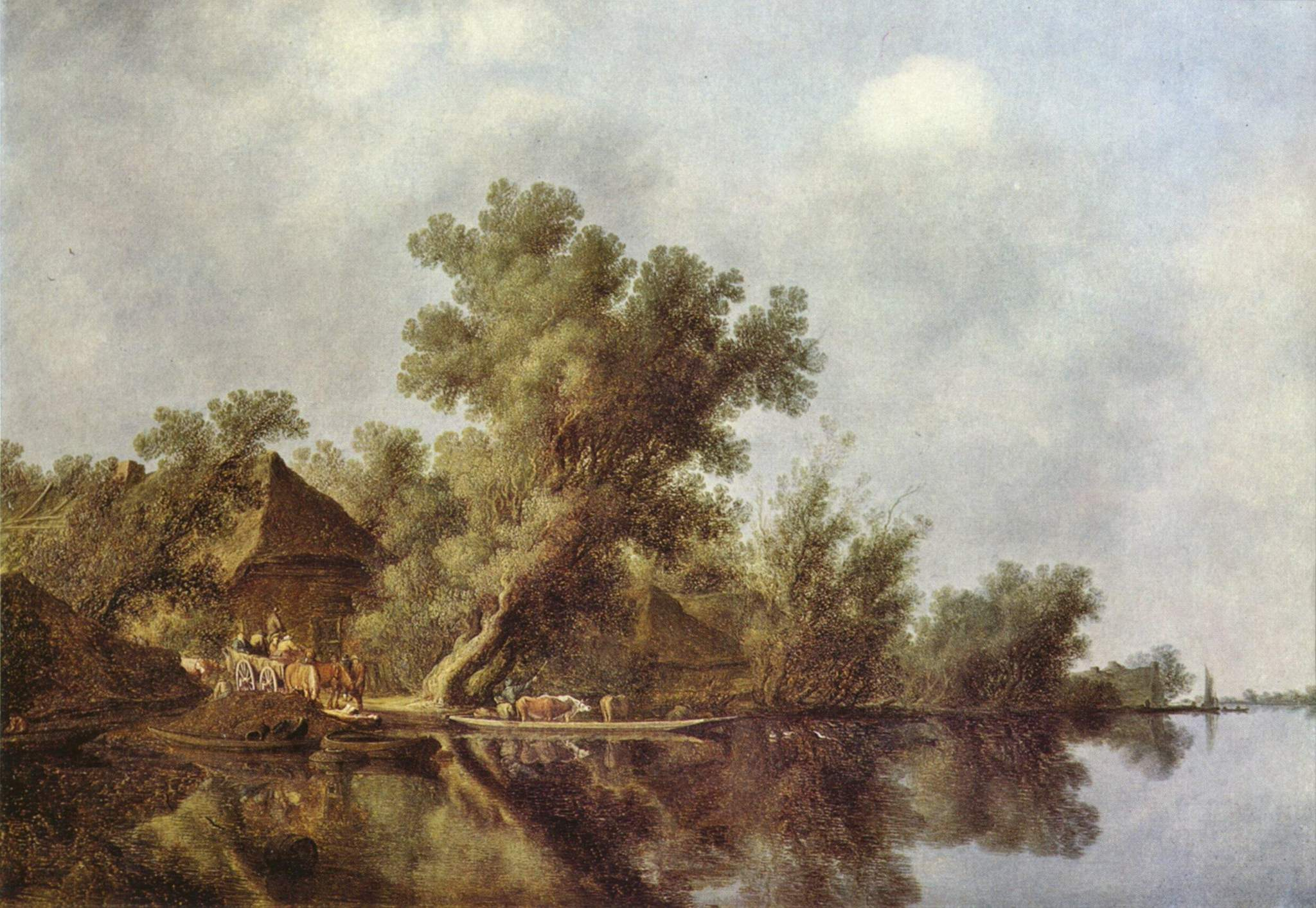
Alte Pinakothek, 1639

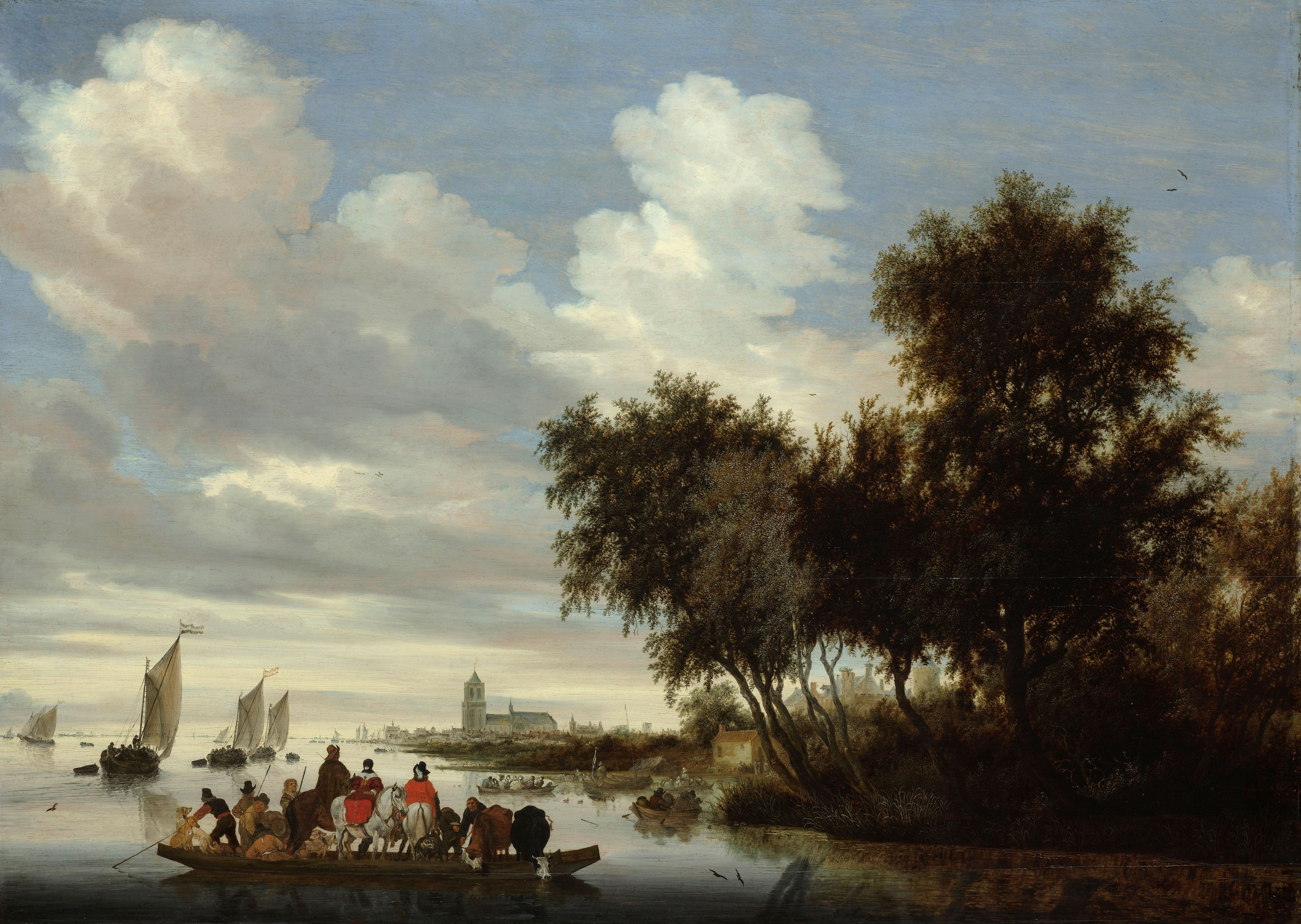
Rijksmuseum, 1649

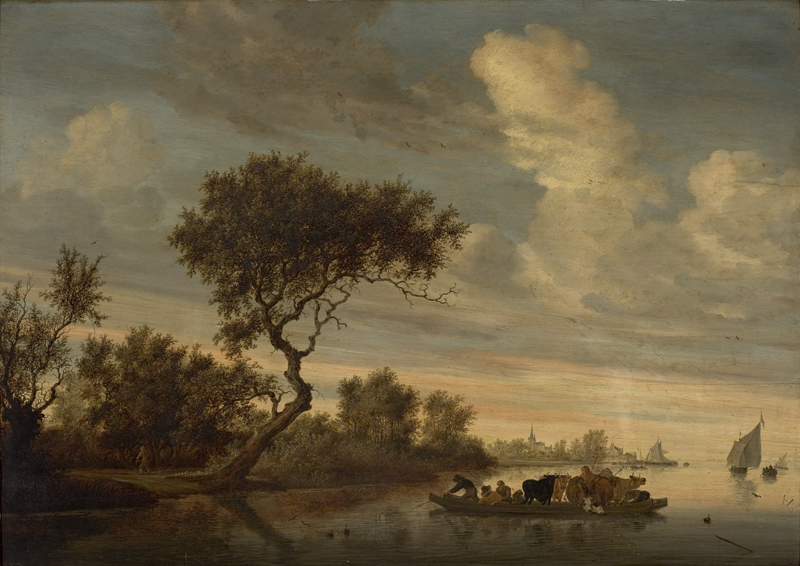
São Paulo Museum of Art, c. 1650
