= Three Regentesses and the Binnenmoeder of the Leprozenhuis of Amsterdam =

1624 painting by Werner van den Valckert

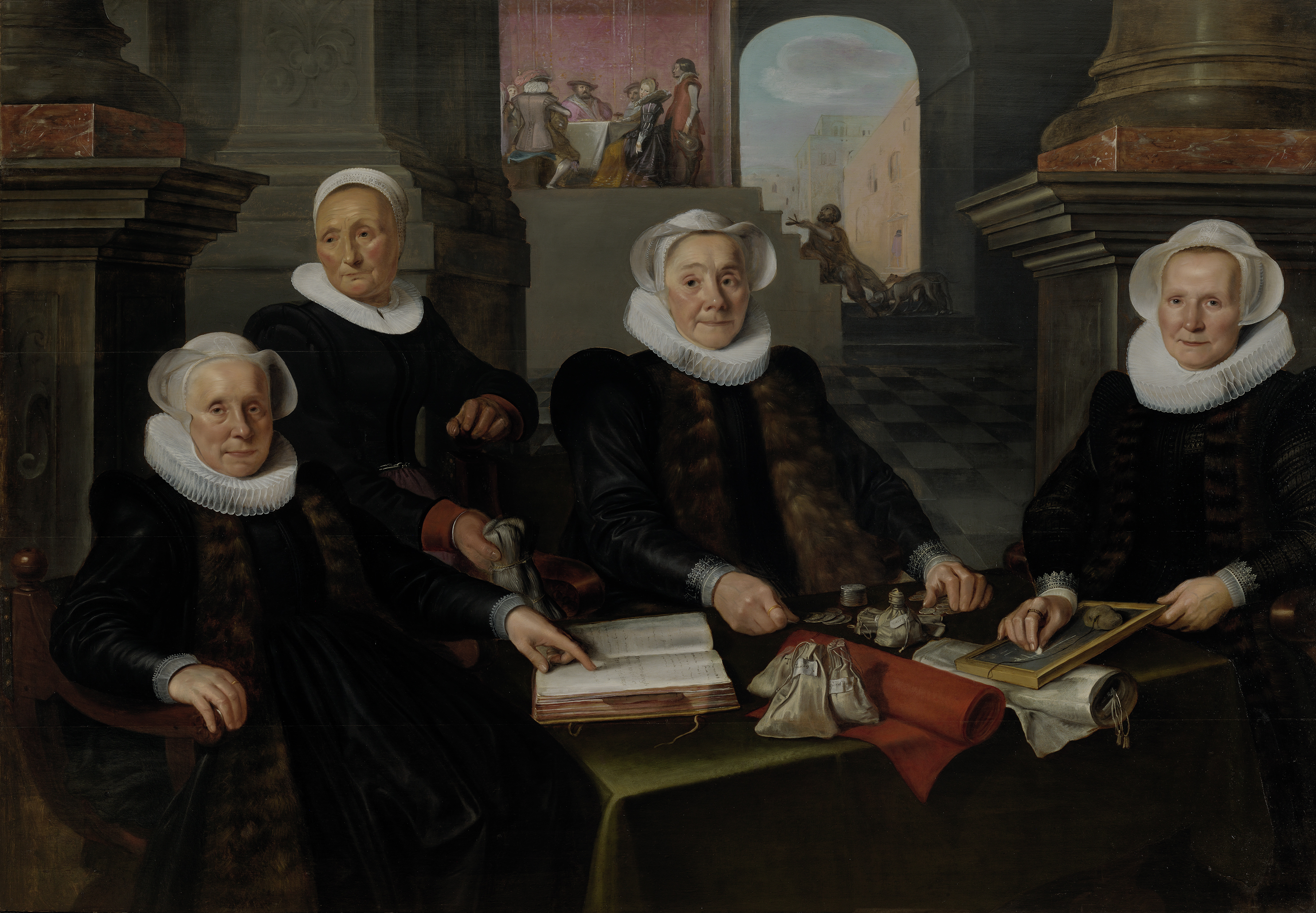
Three Regentesses and the Binnenmoeder of the Leprozenhuis of Amsterdam (1641) by Werner van den Valckert

Three Regentesses and the Binnenmoeder of the Leprozenhuis of Amsterdam is a 1624 oil on panel painting by Werner van den Valckert, now in the Rijksmuseum collection in Amsterdam. It belongs to the regents group portrait genre.
