= Isaac Blessing Jacob (Murillo) =

Painting by Bartolomé Esteban Murillo

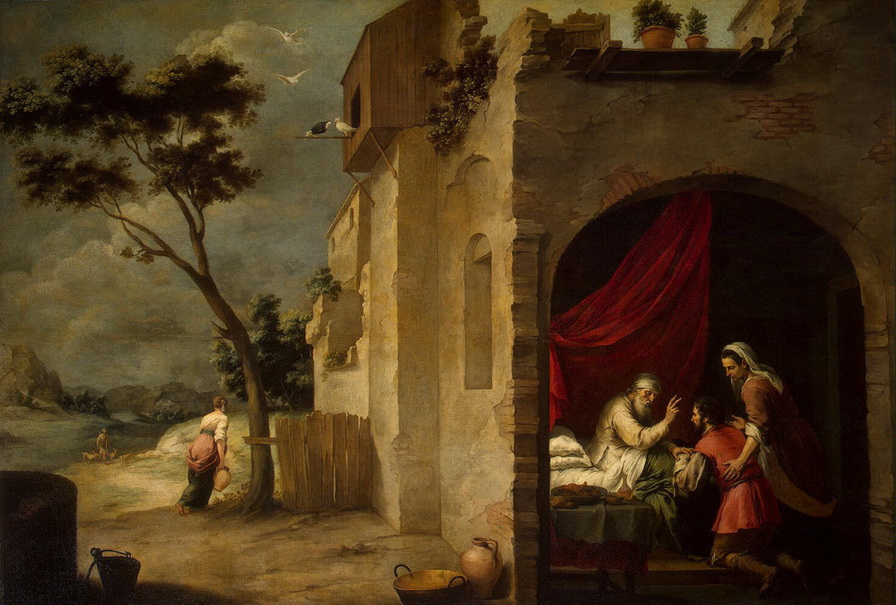
Isaac Blessing Jacob (1665-1670) by Bartolomé Esteban Murillo

Isaac Blessing Jacob is a 1665-1670 oil on canvas painting by Bartolomé Esteban Murillo, forming a pair with Jacob's Dream. Both paintings were acquired via Dominique Vivant Denon in Paris in 1811 for the Hermitage Museum, in Saint Petersburg, where they still hang, along with 26 other works by the artist and his studio.
