= The Virgin and Child with Four Holy Virgins =

Painting by the Master of the Virgo inter Virgines

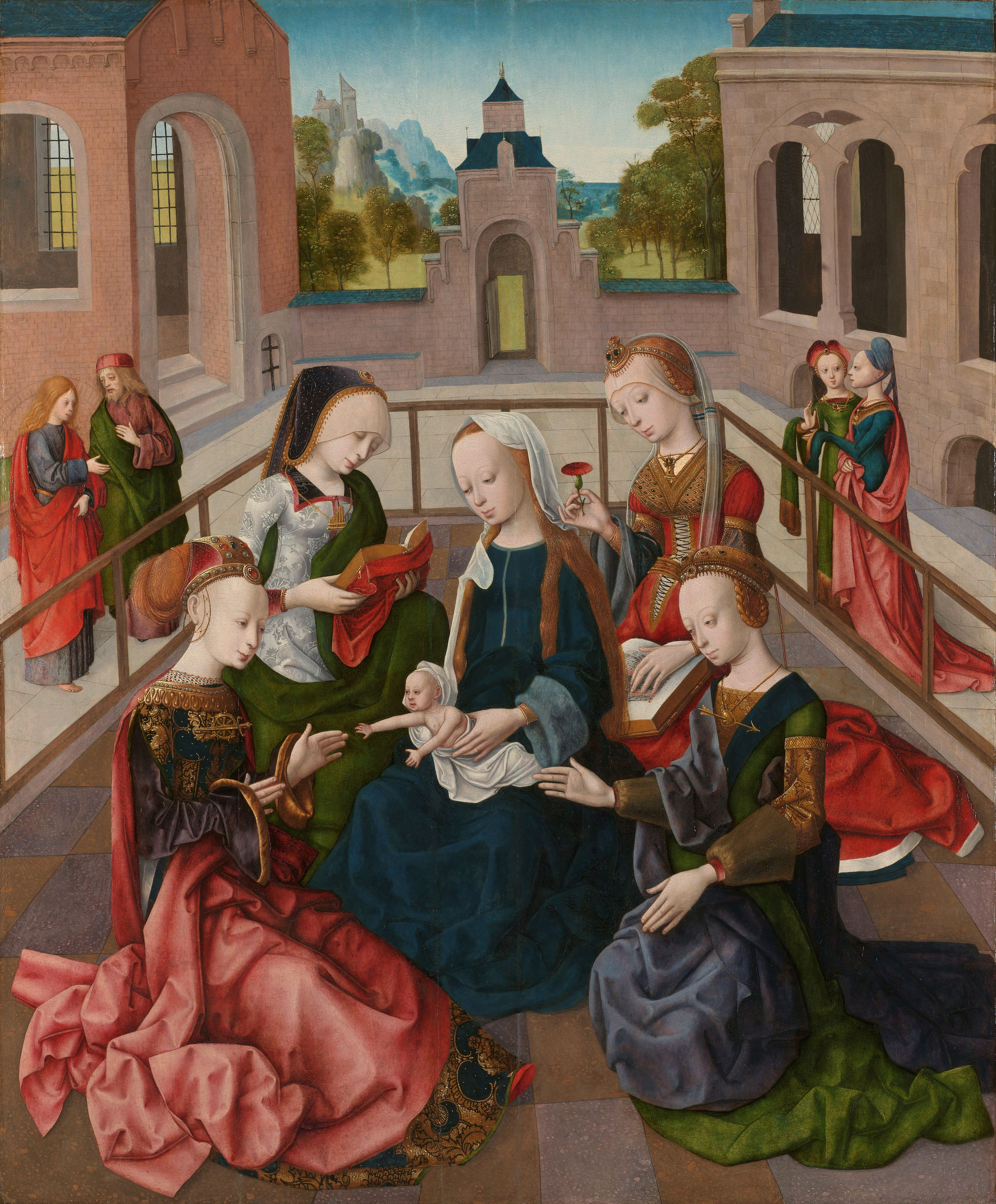
- Artist: Master of the Virgo inter Virgines
- Year: 1470–1505
- Medium: Oil on panel
- Dimensions: 123 cm × 102 cm (48 in × 40 in)
- Location: Rijksmuseum, Amsterdam

The Virgin and Child with Four Holy Virgins is a 15th-century oil on panel painting by the Dutch artist Master of the Virgo inter Virgines in the collection of the Rijksmuseum.

This painting is a former altarpiece of the convent of Koningsveld, near Delft, which was demolished in 1573. It shows the Virgin Mary with Saint Catherine, Saint Cecilia, Saint Ursula, and Saint Barbara in holy communion, or Virgo inter Virgines. The painting is undated, but based on compositional details has been considered a "late work" by the master and therefore dates to the 1490s. This holy communion is often depicted in an enclosed garden or courtyard such as the one in this painting. This courtyard with its open gate has compositional characteristics similar to the ones in the painting by the Master of the Spes Nostra, also in the Rijksmuseum. Unusual is the prominent role of Saint Ursula in the painting, as well as the presence of the two male figures who are difficult to identify.

The painting was attributed to the brothers Jan and Hubert van Eyck until Max J. Friedlander identified it as the work of a different artist in 1903.

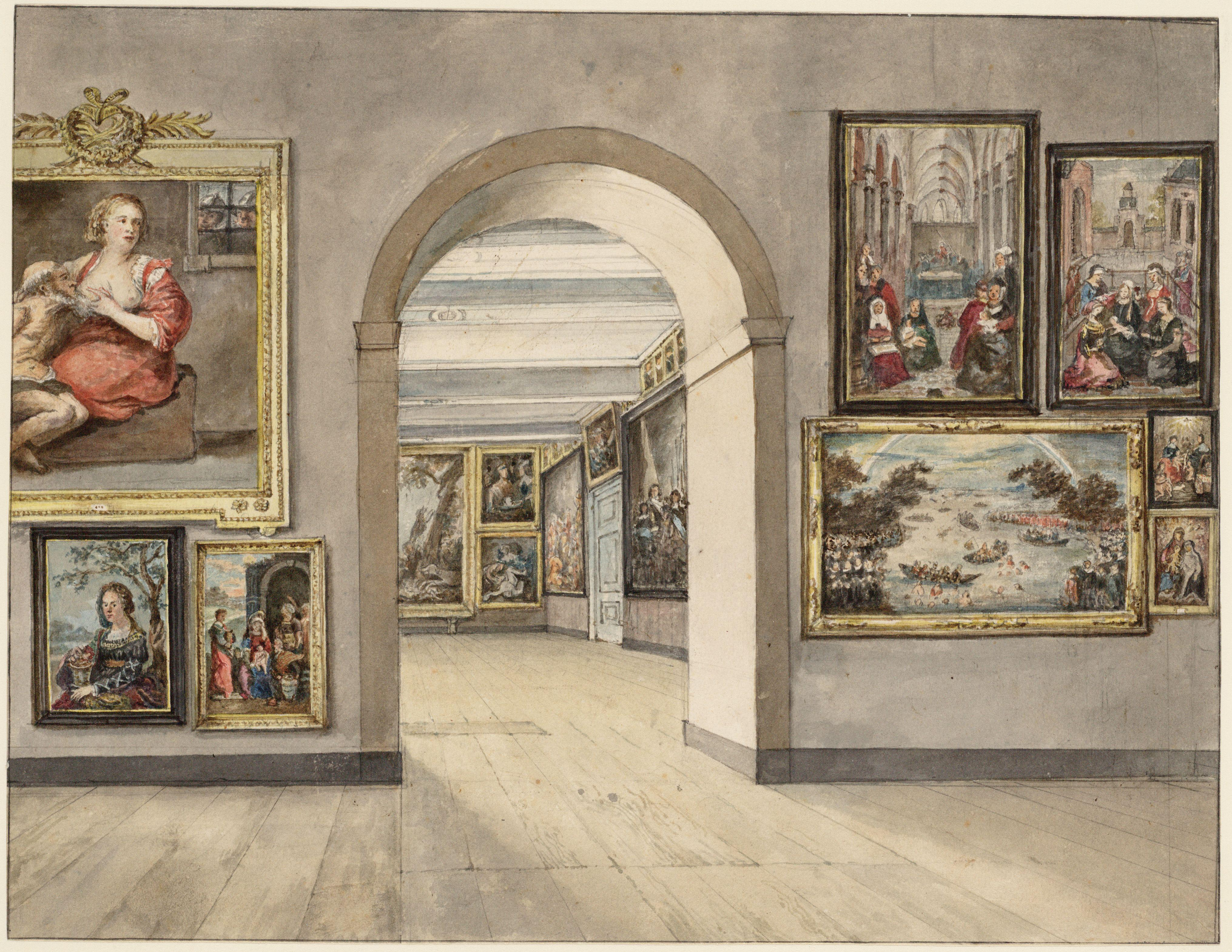
This painting can be seen hanging in a 19th-century sketch of the gallery of the Trippenhuis before the collection was moved to its present location in 1885
