= Master of the Virgo inter Virgines =

Early Netherlandish painter and designer of woodcuts

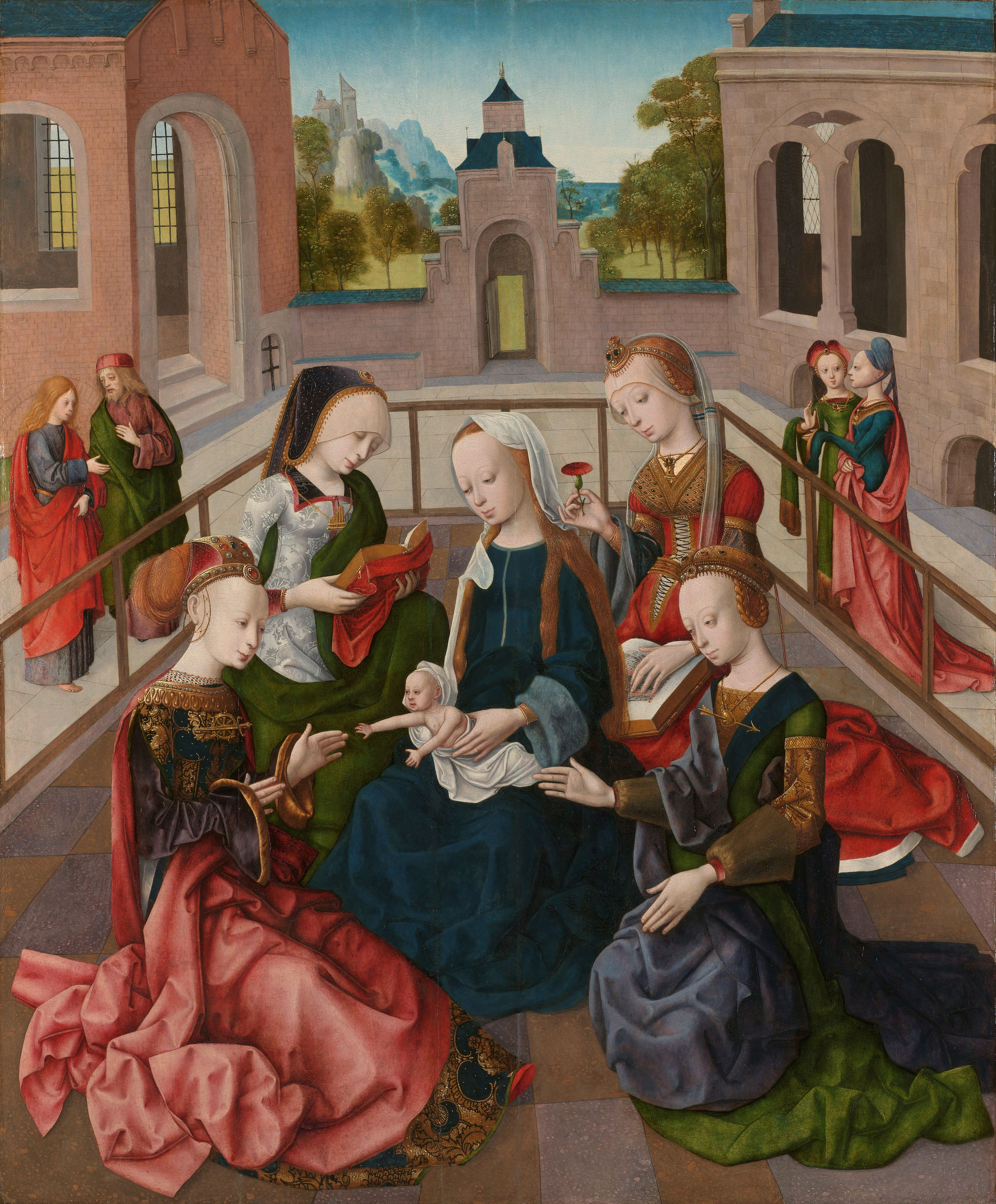
The Virgin and Child with Four Holy Virgins, Rijksmuseum Amsterdam

The Master of the Virgo inter Virgines was an Early Netherlandish painter and designer of woodcuts active around Delft between 1483 and 1498. He is named for The Virgin and Child with Four Holy Virgins, an altarpiece of the Virgin with Saints Catherine, Cecilia, Ursula, and Barbara which formerly hung in the convent of Konigsveld, but which is now in the Rijksmuseum in Amsterdam. He was first distinguished individually in 1903; based upon the style of the altarpiece a considerable body of work has since been built up. The Master has been described as the most uncompromisingly "realist" of his contemporaries, and not at all concerned with elegance; he has also been called a forerunner of the Dutch school of painting.

The other main master active in Delft in these years, and rather later, was the Master of Delft, whose style shared more characteristics of Antwerp Mannerism, though also rooted in realism.

== Gallery ==
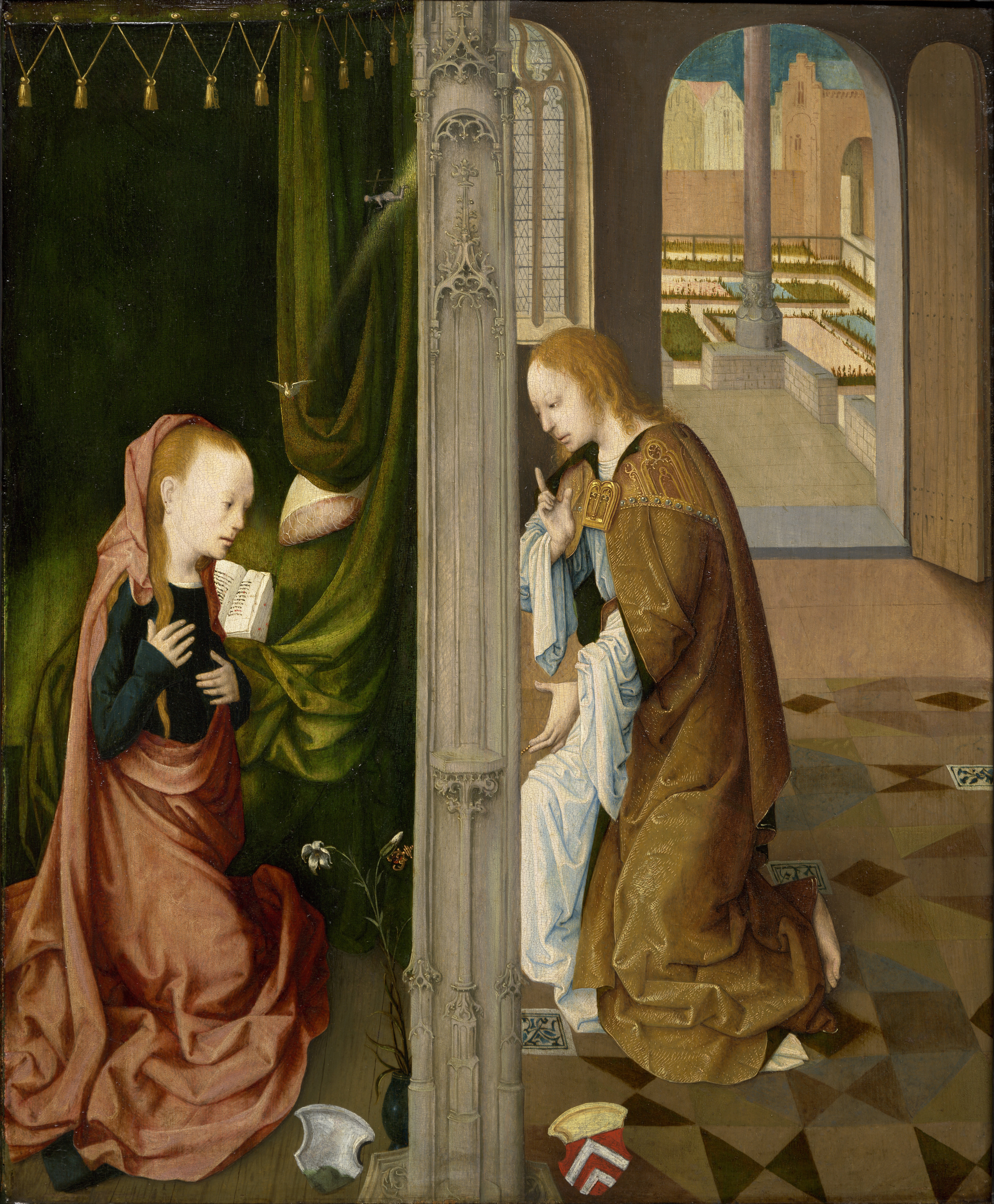
The Annunciation

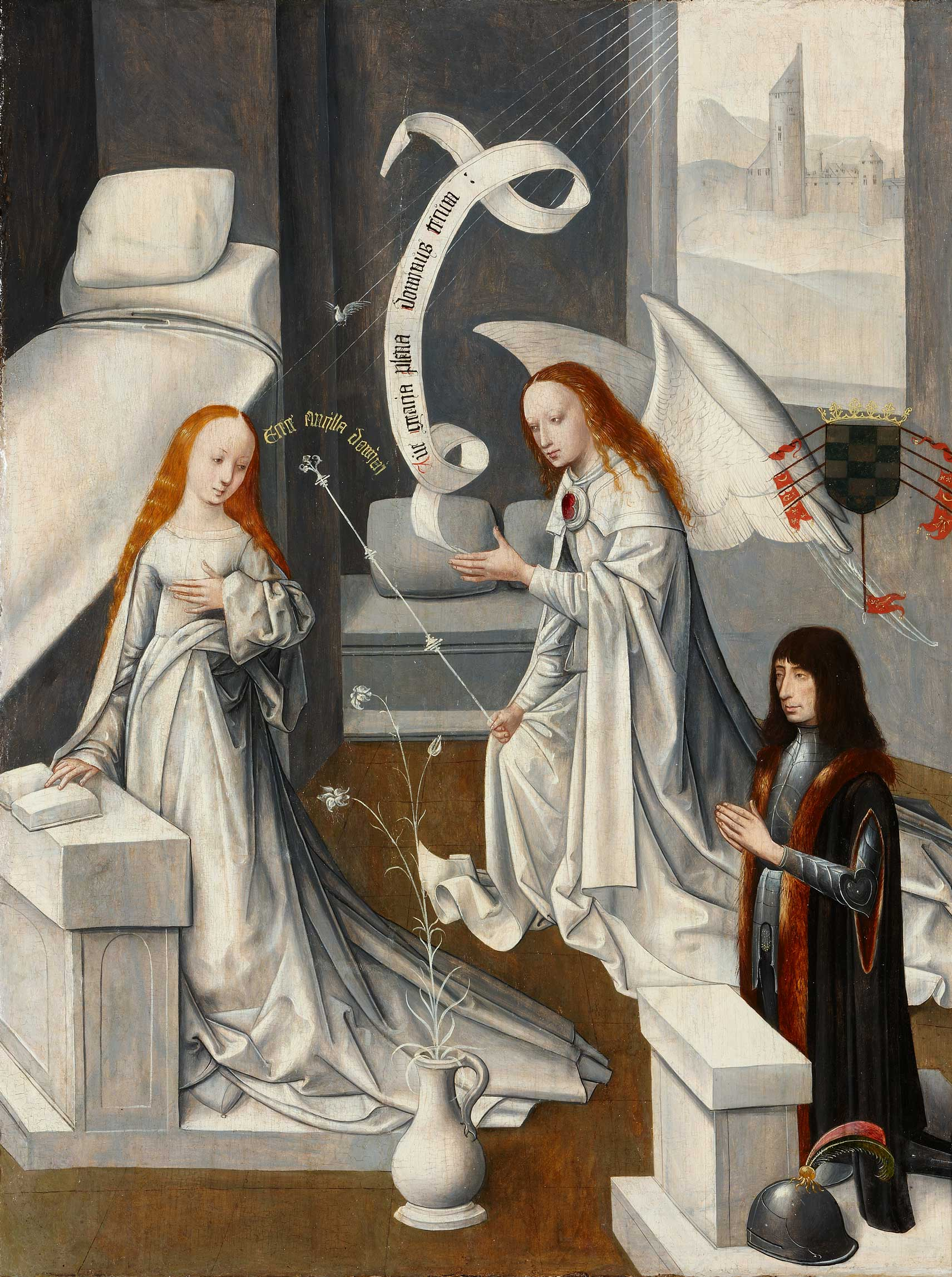
Annunciation with donor portrait, said to be García Álvarez de Toledo, 1st Duke of Alba

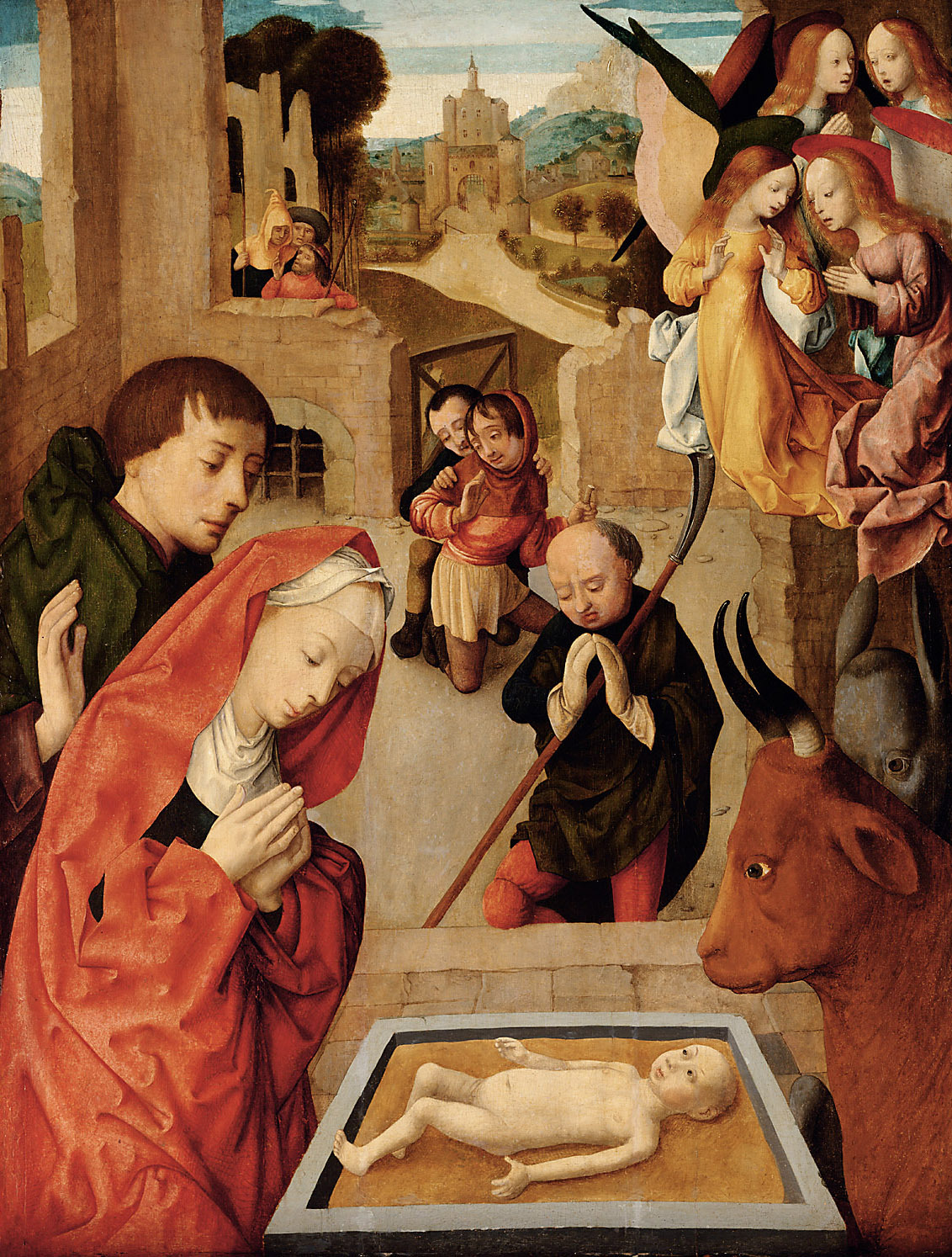
Birth of Christ

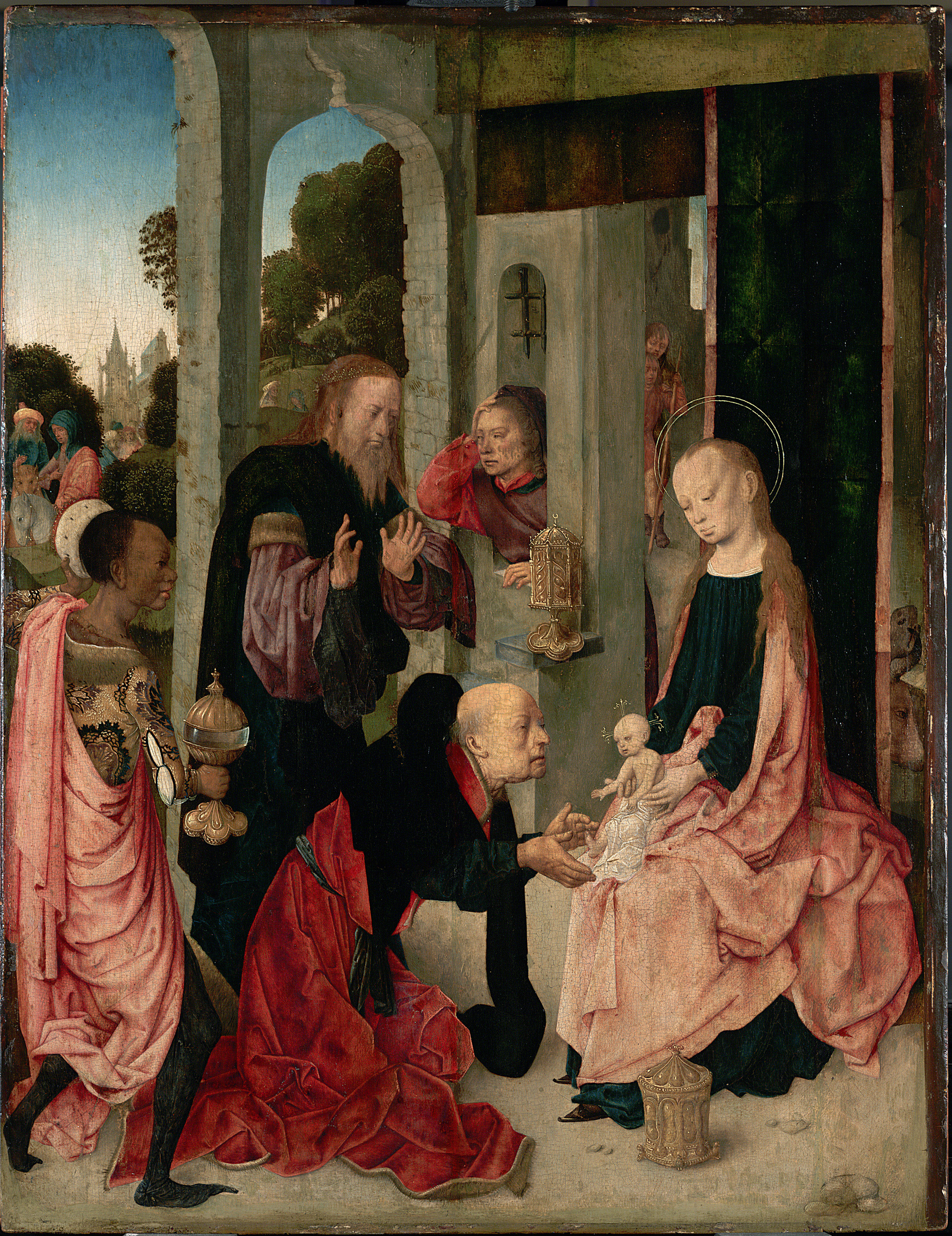
Adoration of the Magi

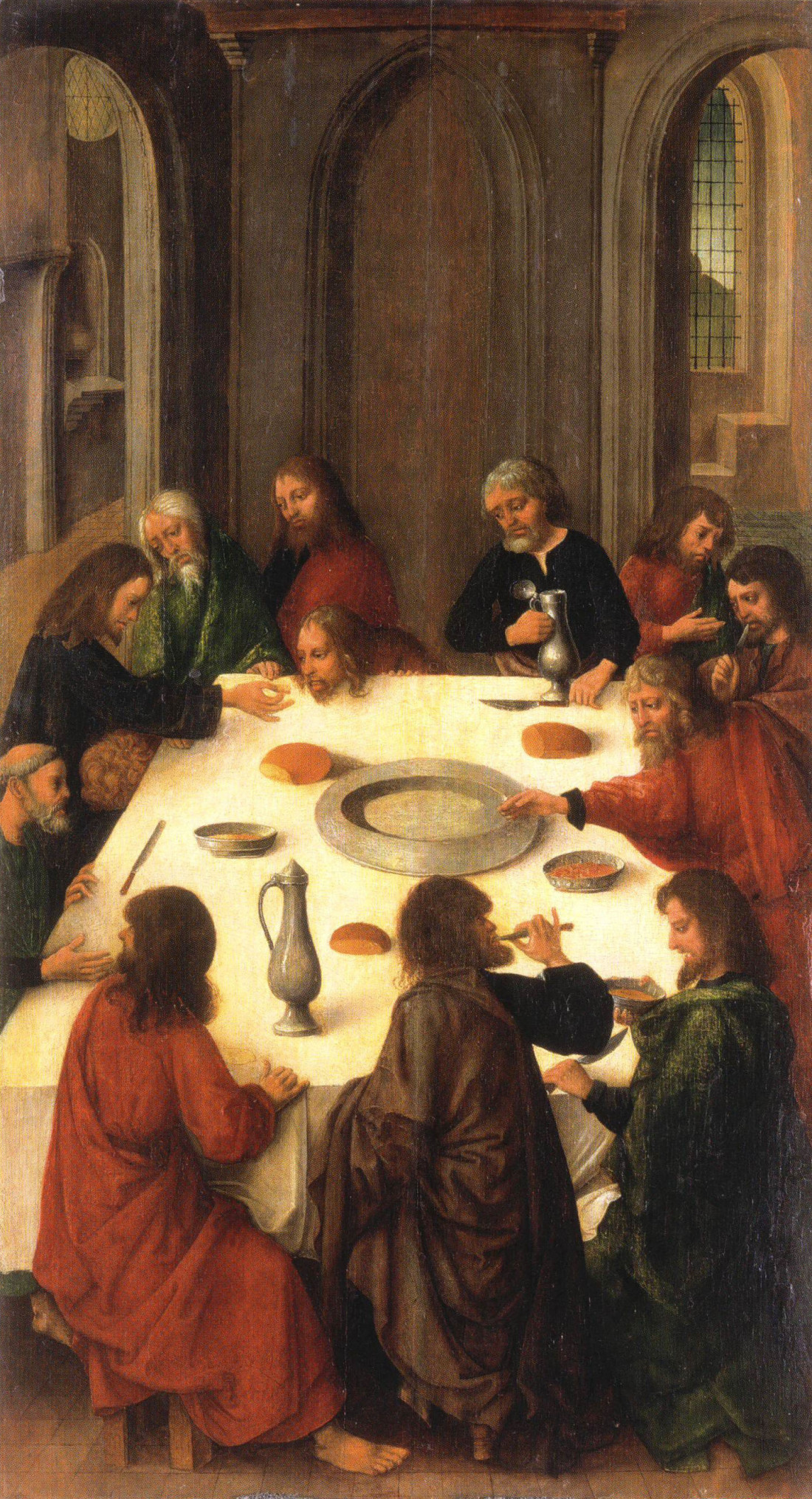
The Last Supper

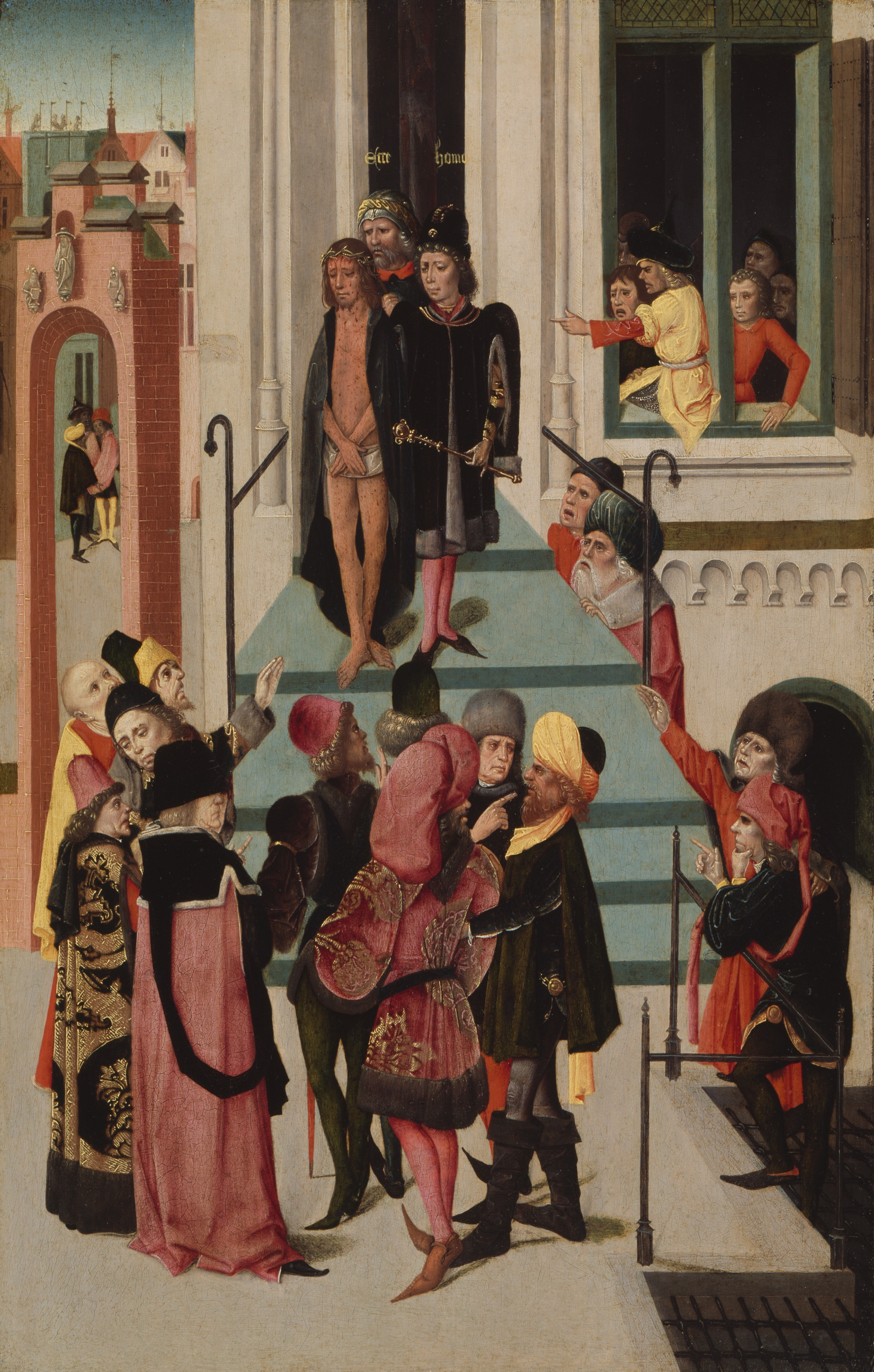
Christ Presented to the People (Ecce homo)

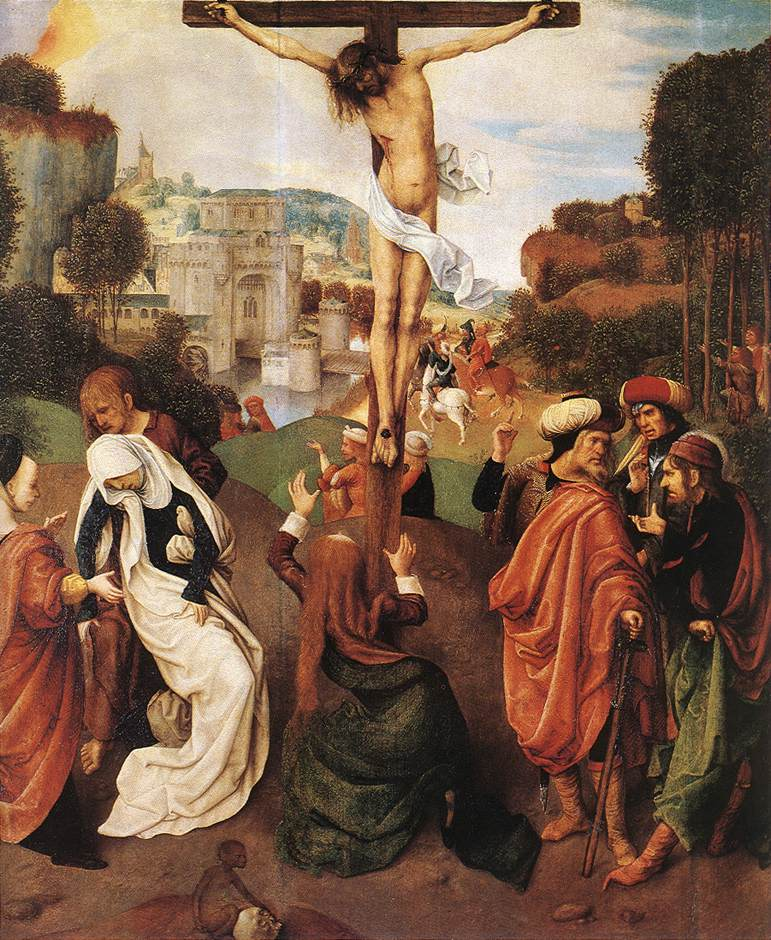
Crucifixion

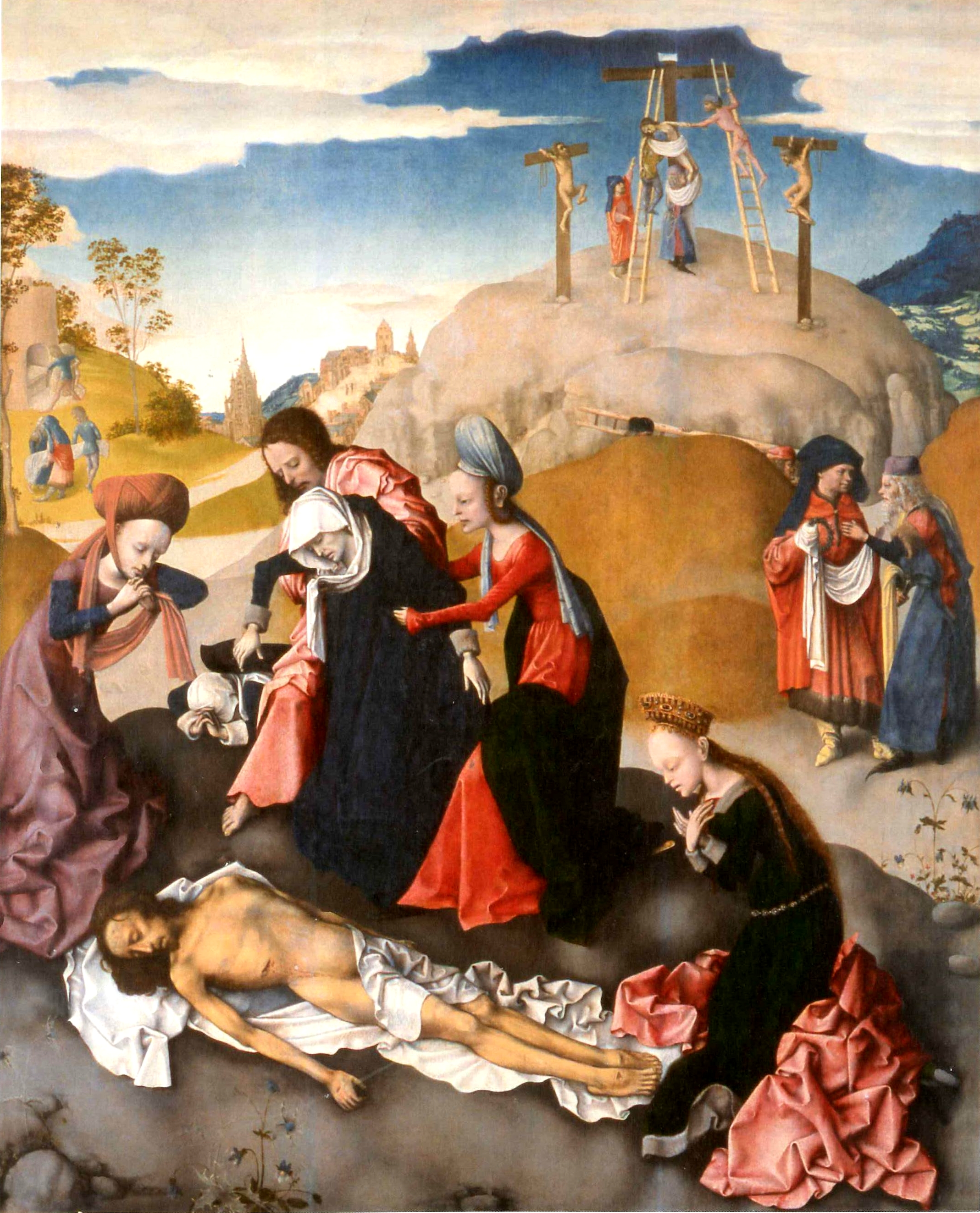
Lamentation of Christ

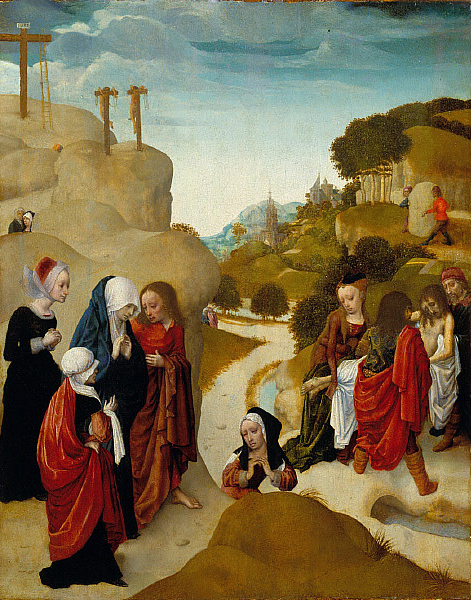
Entombment of Christ, c. 1490. Saint Louis Art Museum

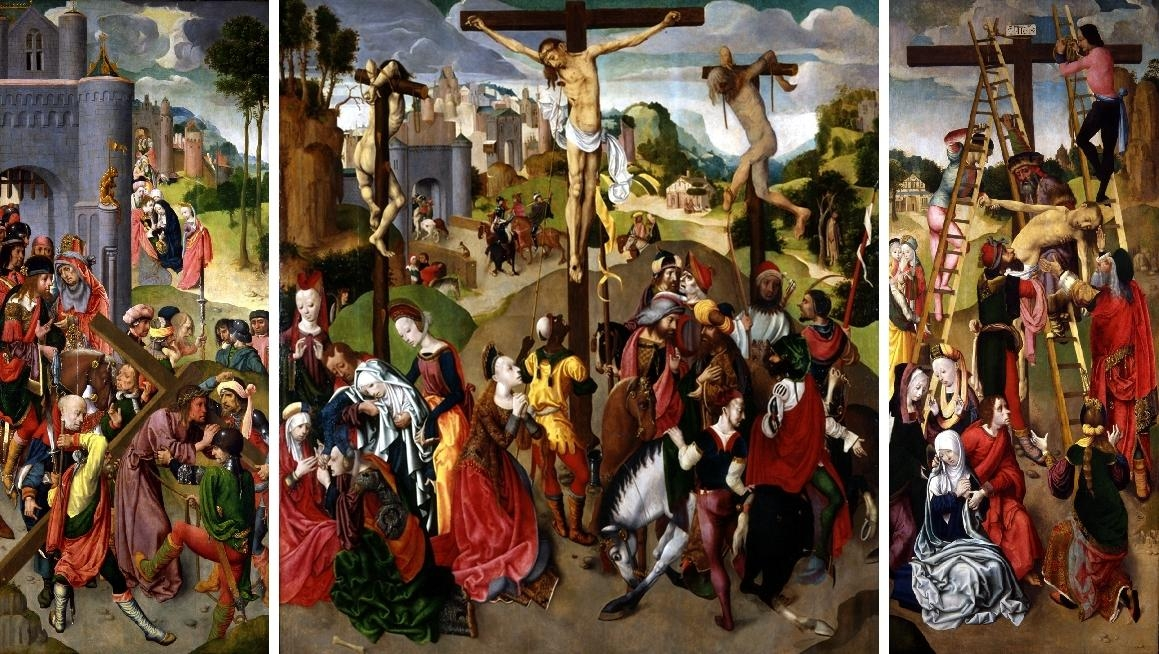
Bowes Triptych, Bowes Museum

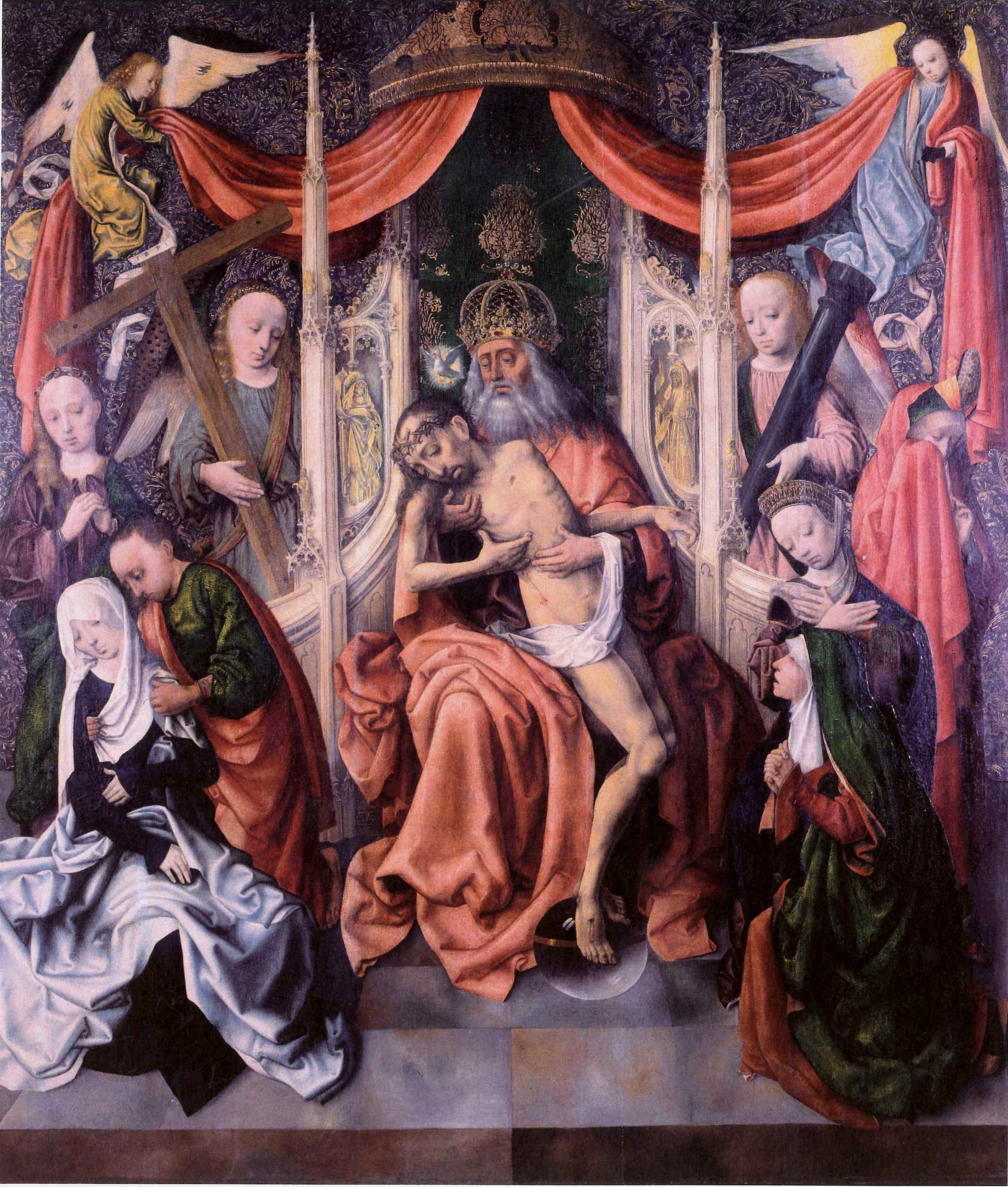
Throne of Mercy

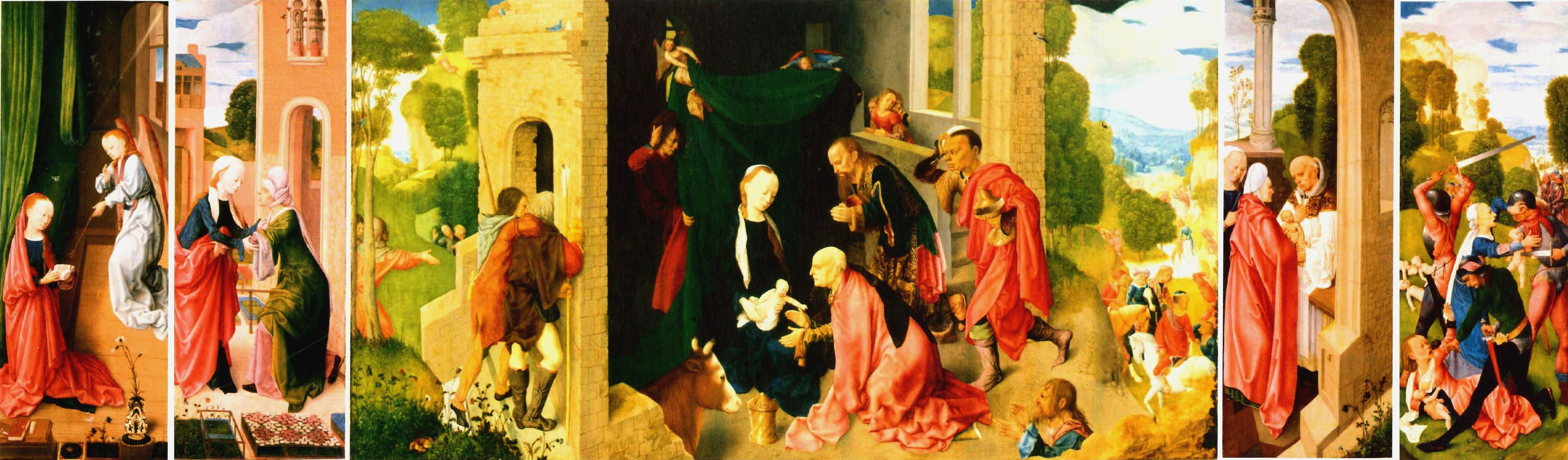
Polyptych with scenes of the Life of Mary
