= Morning Ride on the Beach =

1876 painting by Anton Mauve

- Morgenrit langs het strand (Dutch)
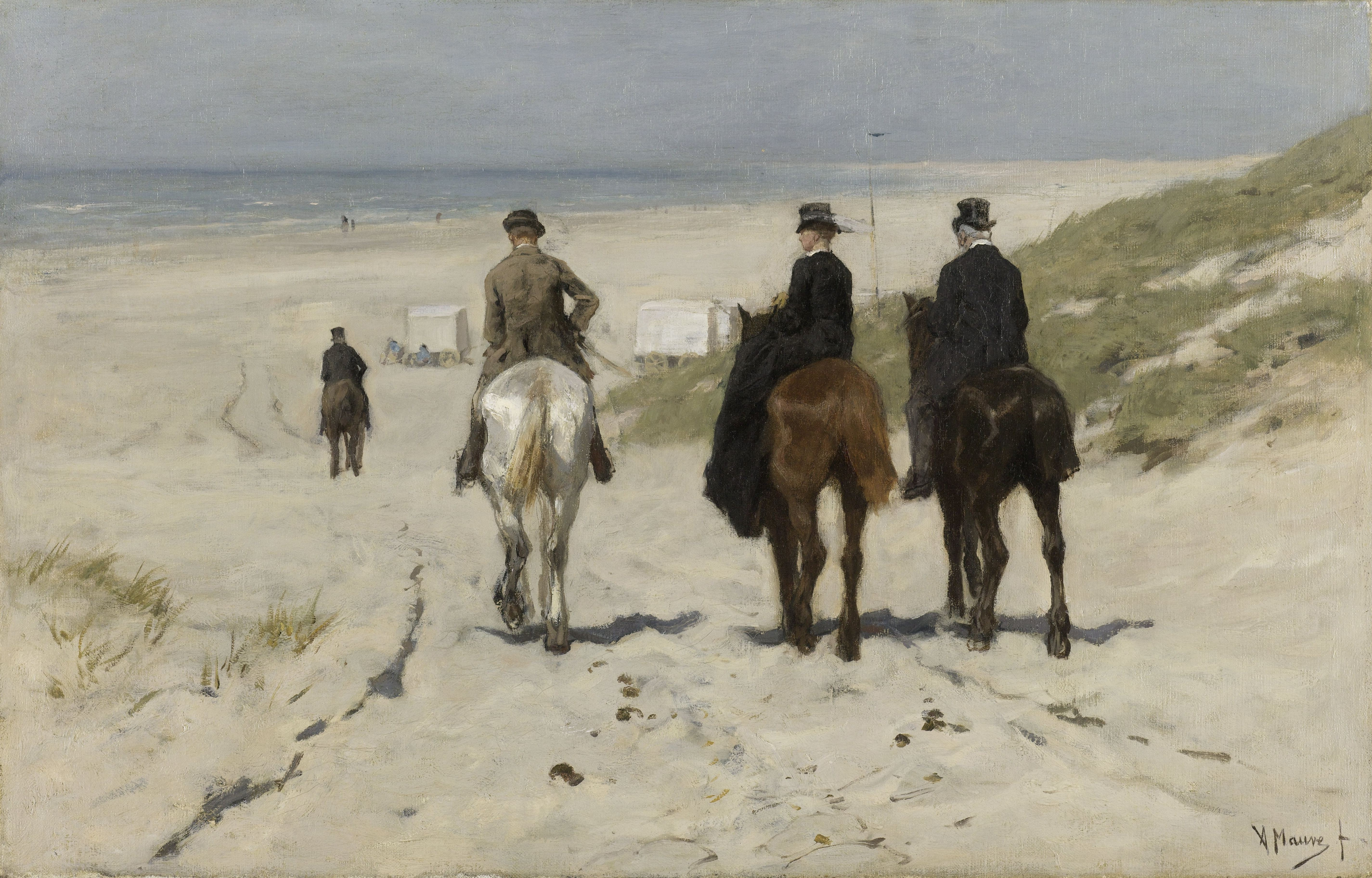
- Artist: Anton Mauve
- Year: 1876
- Medium: Oil on canvas
- Dimensions: 43.7 cm × 68.6 cm (17.2 in × 27.0 in)
- Location: Rijksmuseum; Amsterdam, Netherlands

Morning Ride on the Beach (Dutch: Morgenrit langs het strand) is an 1876 painting by Dutch artist Anton Mauve from the Hague School. It shows a group of riders on the Scheveningen beach, painted in an impressionistic style. The work is now in the collection of the Rijksmuseum in Amsterdam.

== History ==
Mauve was a member of the Hague School, which was known for its portrayal of the harsh existence of fishermen in Scheveningen. Here, however, Mauve chose a different subject in depicting a bourgeois group riding along the beach. The painting shows a group of riders descending to the beach, with bathing cabins ready for swimmers. The riding horses are unusual for a Mauve piece, as he was known for painting animals in their natural environment and was particularly famous for his landscapes with sheep. Mauve chose a particular color scheme of blue and yellow, which is effective in depicting the seaside atmosphere. The movement of light in the painting suggests a high amount of dynamism and motion.

The ingenious use of light in the painting was proven to be more skillful than previously thought after a restoration of the painting was completed in 1991. The restoration removed the yellowish tinge that had permeated the work, and revealed another surprising thing. In his commitment to realism, the artist had depicted horse droppings in the scene, which one of the previous owners must have deemed sufficiently indecent to warrant a covering up.

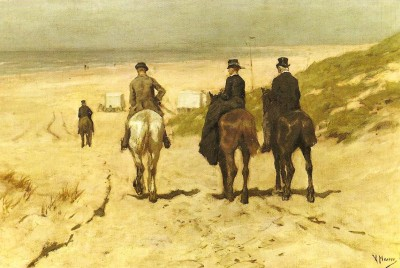
The painting prior to restoration
