= Windmill at Wijk bij Duurstede =

Painting by Jacob van Ruisdael

Coordinates: 51.970073°N 5.347287°E

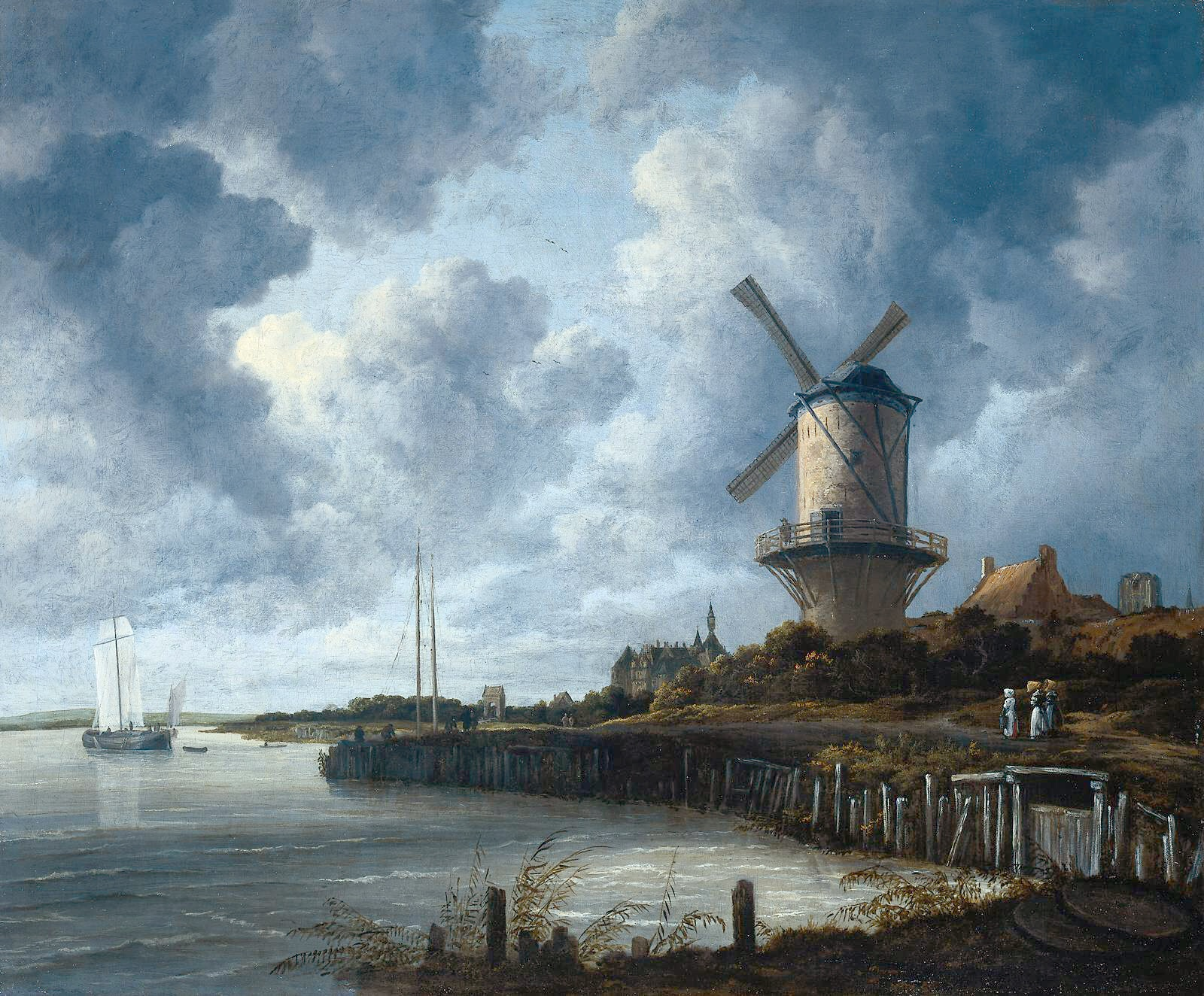
- Artist: Jacob van Ruisdael
- Year: c. 1670
- Type: Oil
- Medium: Canvas
- Dimensions: 83 cm × 101 cm (33 in × 40 in)
- Location: Amsterdam Museum on loan to the Rijksmuseum; Amsterdam
- Website: Amsterdam Collection online

The Windmill of Wijk bij Duurstede (c. 1670) is an oil-on-canvas painting by the Dutch painter Jacob van Ruisdael. It is an example of Dutch Golden Age painting and is now in the collection of the Amsterdam Museum, on loan to the Rijksmuseum.

== Subject, date, and provenance ==
The painting shows Wijk bij Duurstede, a riverside town about 20 kilometers from Utrecht, with a dominating cylindrical windmill, harmonised by the lines of river bank and sails, and the contrasts between light and shadow working together with the intensified concentration of mass and space. The attention to detail is remarkable. Art historian Seymour Slive reports that both from an aeronautical engineering and a hydrological viewpoint the finest levels of details are correct, in the windmill's sails and the river's waves respectively.

It is not known for certain when Ruisdael painted the Windmill. The painting is not dated, as very few of his works are after 1653. Dating subsequent work has therefore been largely detective work and speculation. It is assumed that it was painted in 1670.

Unlike many other Ruisdaels the Windmill seems to have remained in Dutch hands. It was acquired by Adriaan van der Hoop at an unknown date, and bequeathed by him to the new Amsterdam Museum in 1854. Since 30 June 1885 it has been on loan to the Rijksmuseum in Amsterdam. Its enduring popularity is evidenced by card sales at the Rijksmuseum, with the Windmill ranking third after Rembrandt's Night Watch and Vermeer's View of Delft.

== The other windmill at Wijk bij Duurstede ==
Ruisdael's windmill no longer stands, although its foundations can still be seen. Another windmill located a few hundred meters further is often confused with Ruisdael's. This confusion was created in 1911 when Hofstede de Groot wrote about the painting:

"The Rhine flows from the left distance, filling almost the whole foreground except for a strip of the right-hand bank which is seen in front.

The bank is lined with piles; reeds grow on it in the centre foreground. In the right middle distance is the great stone mill, with its sails at the back and inclined to the left. It rises far above the low trees around it and the episcopal palace beyond it to the left. To the right of the mill is a cottage; farther to the right rises the church tower of the town. On a road along the bank to the right are three women. In the right foreground lie two millstones. On the river in the left distance are two sailing-boats. To the right of them, behind a bend in the stream, rise two masts. A fine cloudy sky. The mill still stands at this spot where the Rhine divides to form the Lek and the Kromme Rhyn (or " Crooked " Rhine). But it is not so high as it seems in the picture; and the lower part is now square and not round, and has a passage through it. Houses now stand where the low trees are seen round the mill. One of Ruisdael's finest pictures. [Compare 183 and 936.]

Signed in full on the right at foot; canvas, 33 inches by 40 inches.

Engraved by L. C. van Kesteren, W. Steelink the elder, and J. H. Graadt van Roggen. Sale. ]. Noe, 1841. In the collection of A. van der Hoop, Amsterdam; bequeathed to the town in 1854. In the Rijksmuseum, Amsterdam, Van der Hoop bequest, 1910 catalogue, No. 2074."

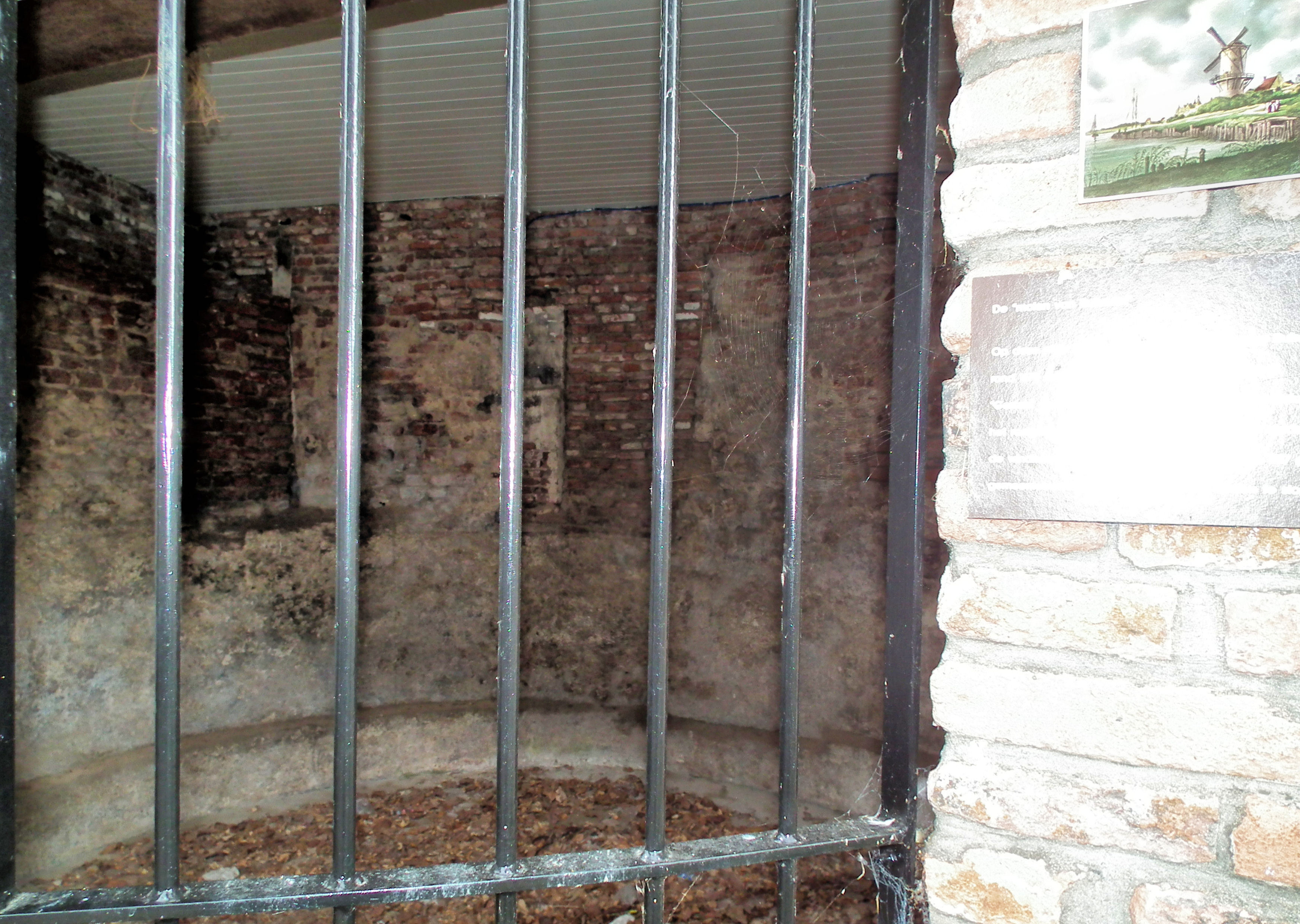
All that's left of the original mill

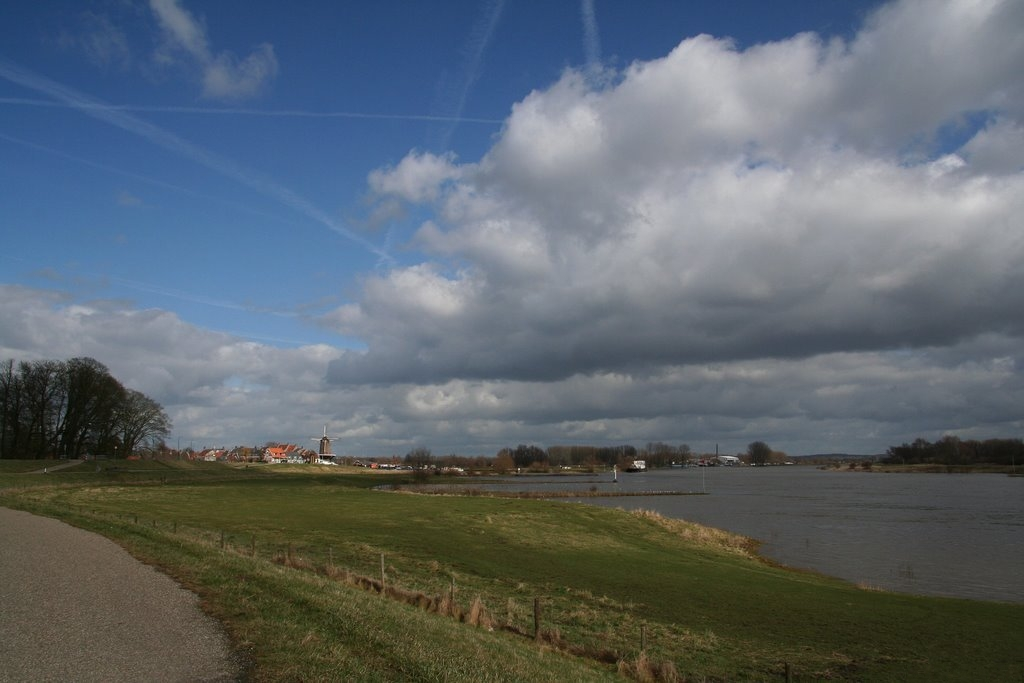
Skyline of Wijk bij Duurstede today

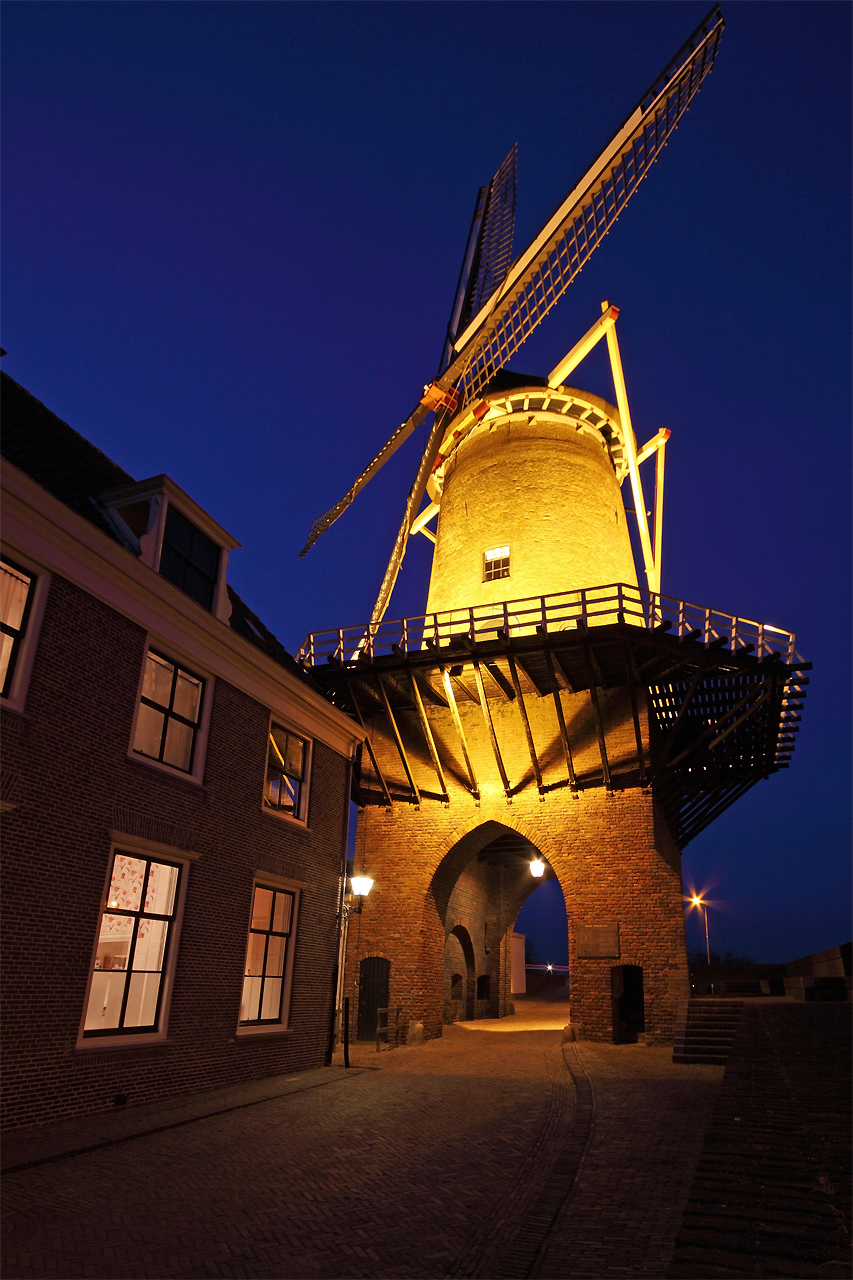
The other windmill in Wijk bij Duurstede, by night

== Similar paintings ==
This scene is similar to other Ruisdael panoramas of (unidentified) windmills. Ruisdael's work inspired later landscape painters such as John Constable.

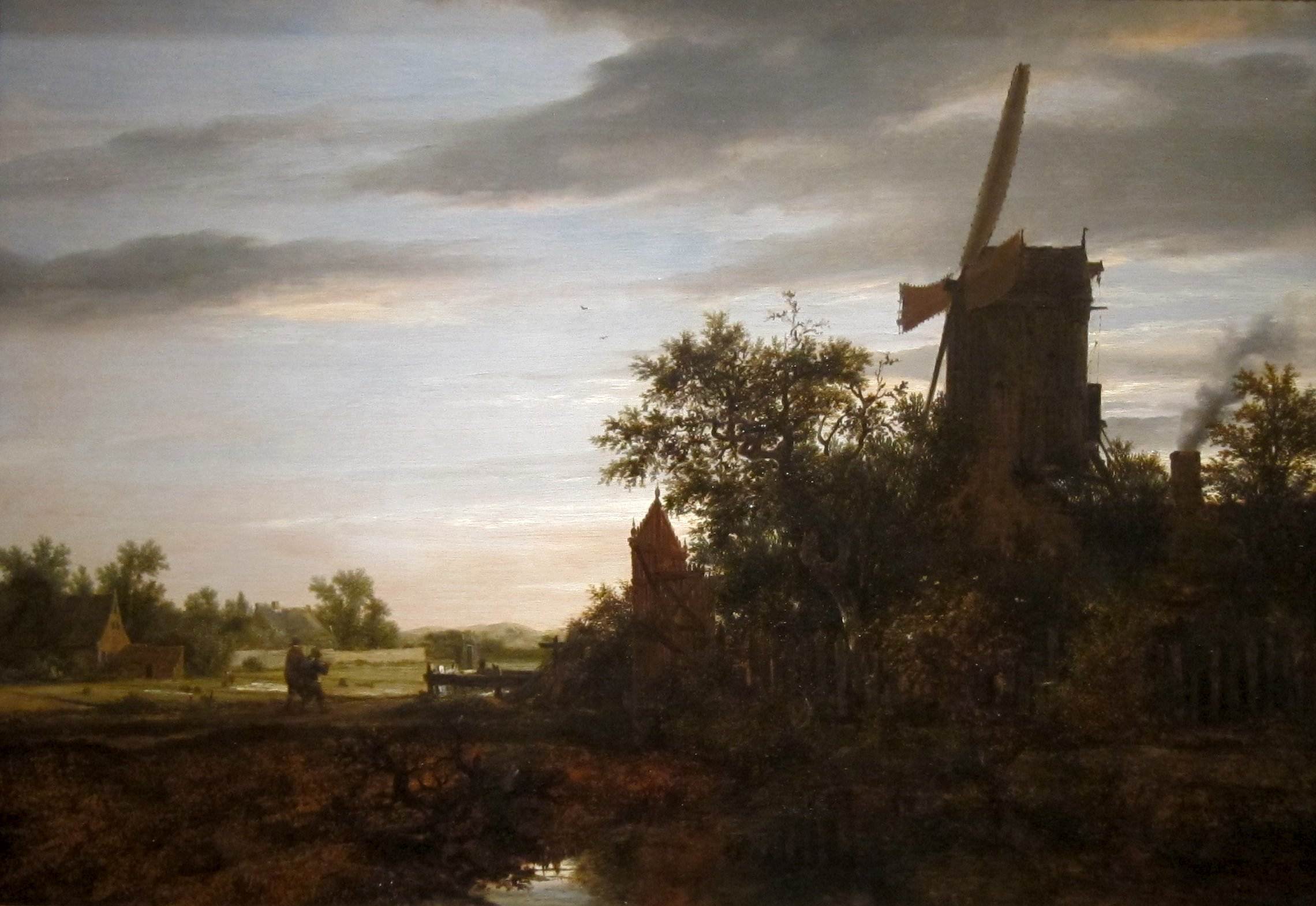
Cleveland Museum of Art

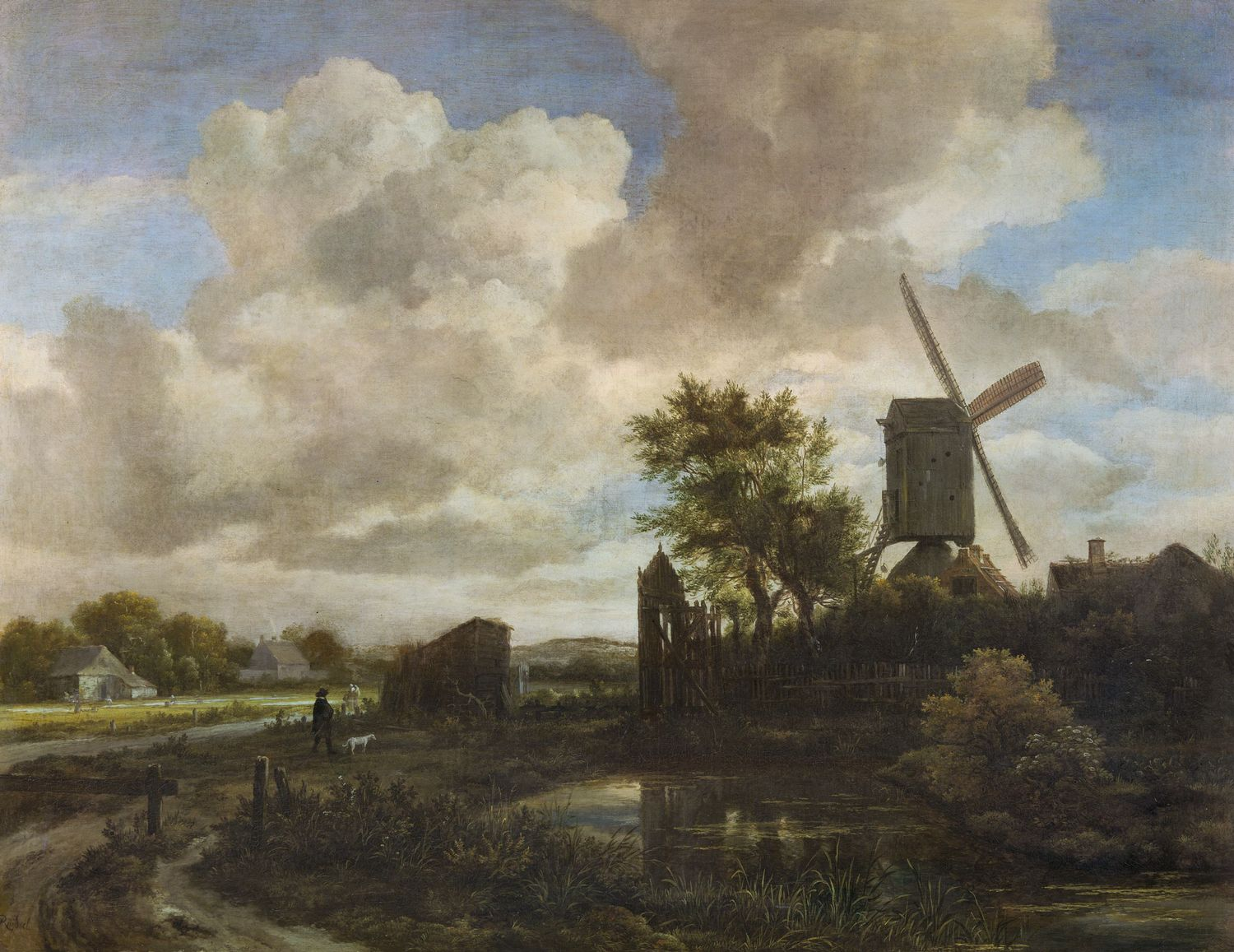
Royal Collection

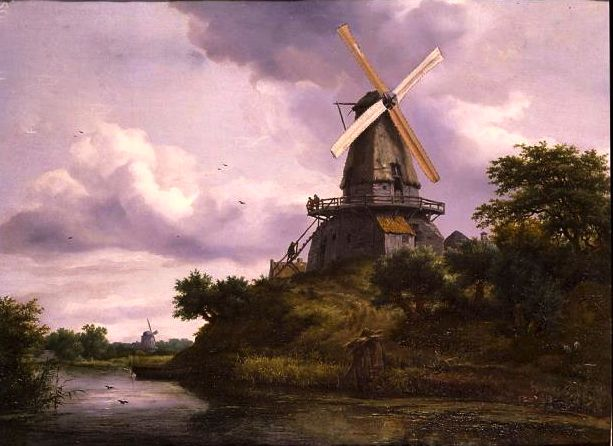
Private collection

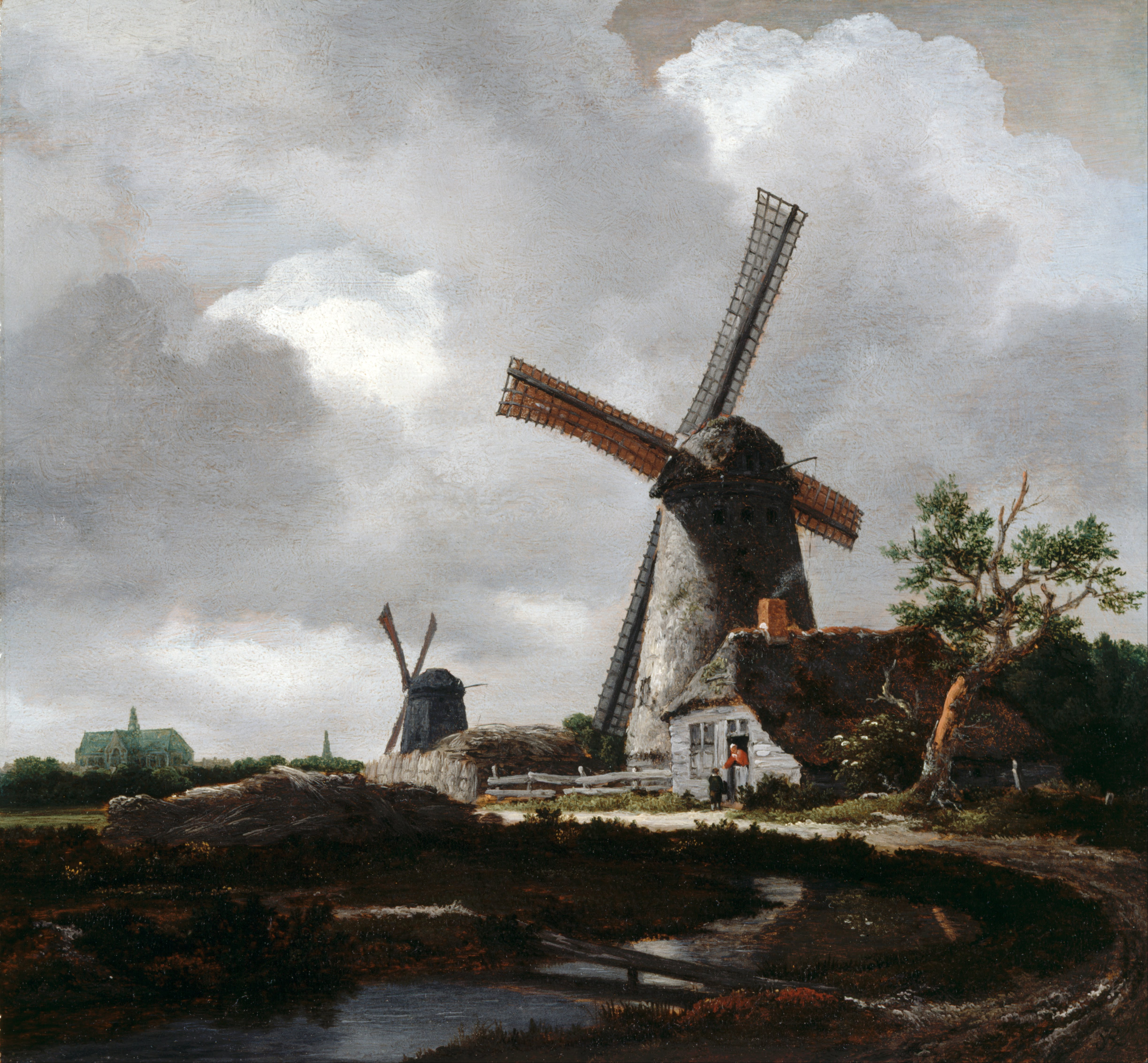
Dulwich Picture Gallery

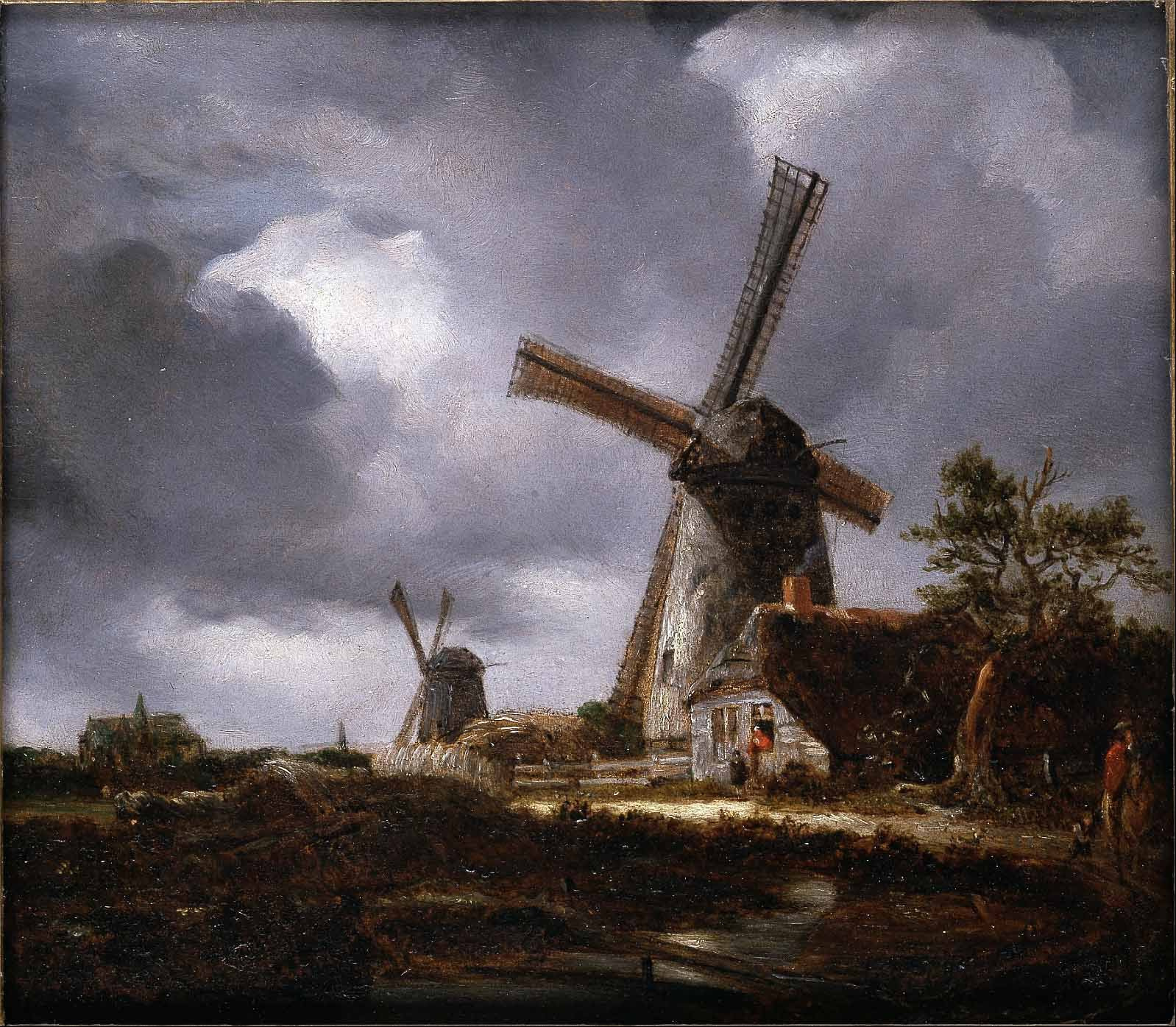
Copy by Constable

== See also ==
- List of paintings by Jacob van Ruisdael
