= Isaac Blessing Jacob (Govert Flinck) =

Painting by Govert Flinck

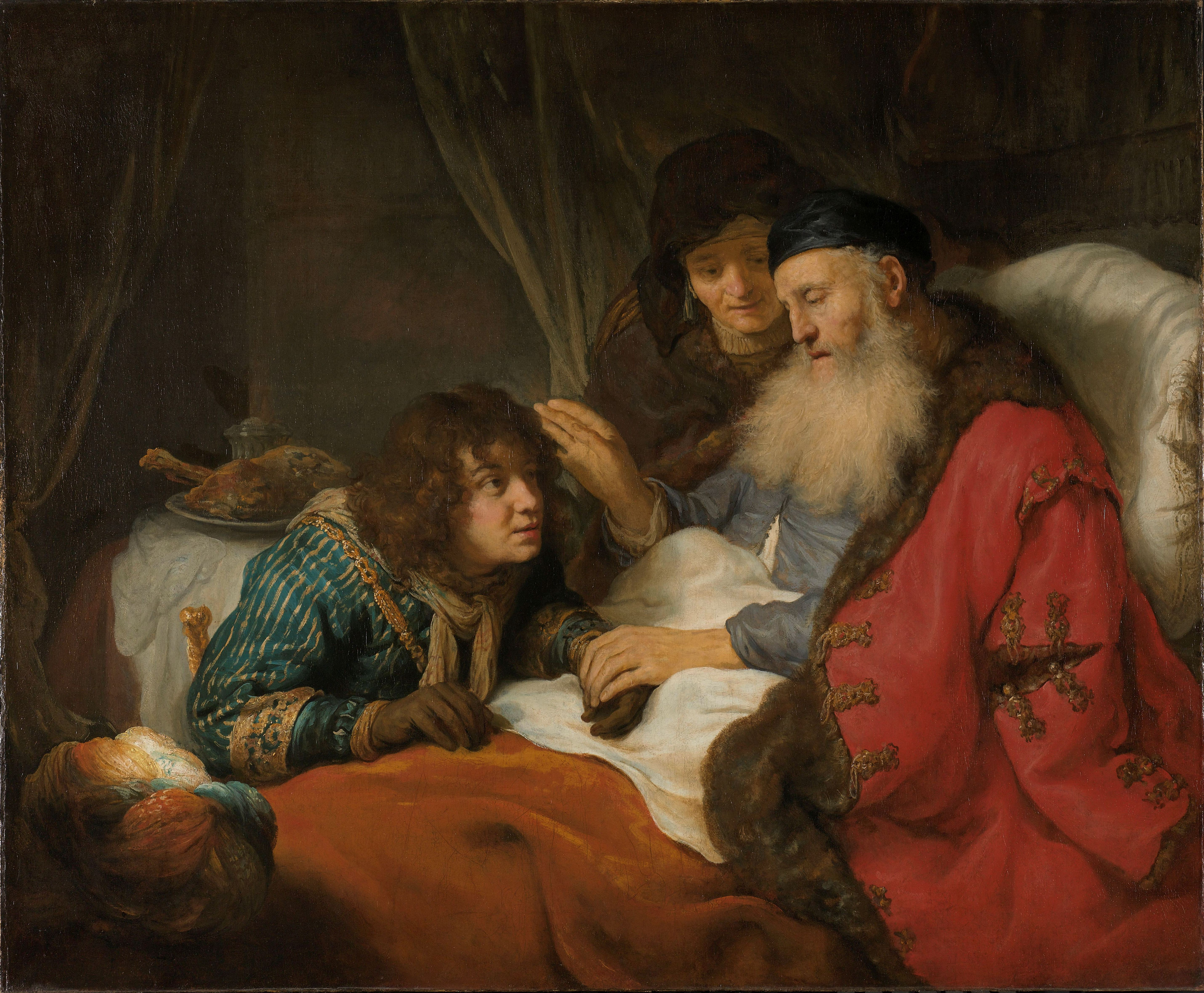
- Artist: Govert Flinck
- Year: 1638
- Medium: Oil on canvas
- Movement: Baroque
- Dimensions: 117 cm × 141 cm (46 in × 56 in)
- Location: Rijksmuseum, Ámsterdam

Isaac Blessing Jacob is a 1638 oil on canvas painting by the Dutch artist Govert Flinck, now in the Rijksmuseum in Amsterdam with the catalogue number SK-A-110.

== Description ==
The bible recounts of how Jacob pretended to be his brother Esau which tricks his blind father Isaac to bless him. The art style is reminiscent of Rembrandt, whom Flinck was trained by.
