= Werner van den Valckert =

Dutch painter and engraver

- Portrait historié of a family with the Baptism of John the Baptist and a self-portrait of the artist in the upper left.
- Born: Werner van den Valckert ca. 1580–1585 probably in or near The Hague
- Died: 1627-1628 possibly Amsterdam
- Known for: Painting, printmaking
- Movement: Baroque

Werner van den Valckert (ca. 1580–1585 – 1627-1628) was a Dutch painter, draughtsman and printmaker who was active in The Hague and Amsterdam. He is known for his portraits, mythological and bible scenes and allegorical works.

== Life ==
Little is known about the life of the artist. He was likely born between 1580 and 1585 in or near The Hague. He may have trained under the glass painter Cornelis Sybertsz. Monicx van Montfoort between 1600 and 1612. He may also have been apprenticed to the German-born Dutch painter and printmaker Hendrick Goltzius who was active in Haarlem between 1591 and 1617. There is no evidence for such apprenticeship.

Valckert likely became a member of the Guild of St. Luke in the Hague between 1600 and 1605. On 6 November 1605 he married in The Hague Jannetje Cornelis van Montfoort, a daughter of his presumed master Cornelis Sybertsz. Monicx van Montfoort. He bought a house at the Nieuwe Schoolstraat in 1609. Andries Jeremias was in 1612 his pupil in The Hague.

Allegory of Music

He moved likely in 1613 to Amsterdam, where a daughter Judith was baptized on 10 August 1614. Three more children followed in the next five years. Van den Valckert must have expected that in Amsterdam he could be sure of portrait commissions and also make a living as a history painter. In 1618 he participated in the execution of oil on copper paintings for a large commission obtained by Pieter Isaacsz. from the King of Denmark on which other Amsterdam-based artists also worked. In the same year, he designed the title page for the second edition of Karel van Mander's Schilder-boeck.

His place and date of death are unknown. It is believed that he died in Amsterdam or elsewhere in 1627 (year he last paid tax on his house in Amsterdam) or 1628. e

== Work ==
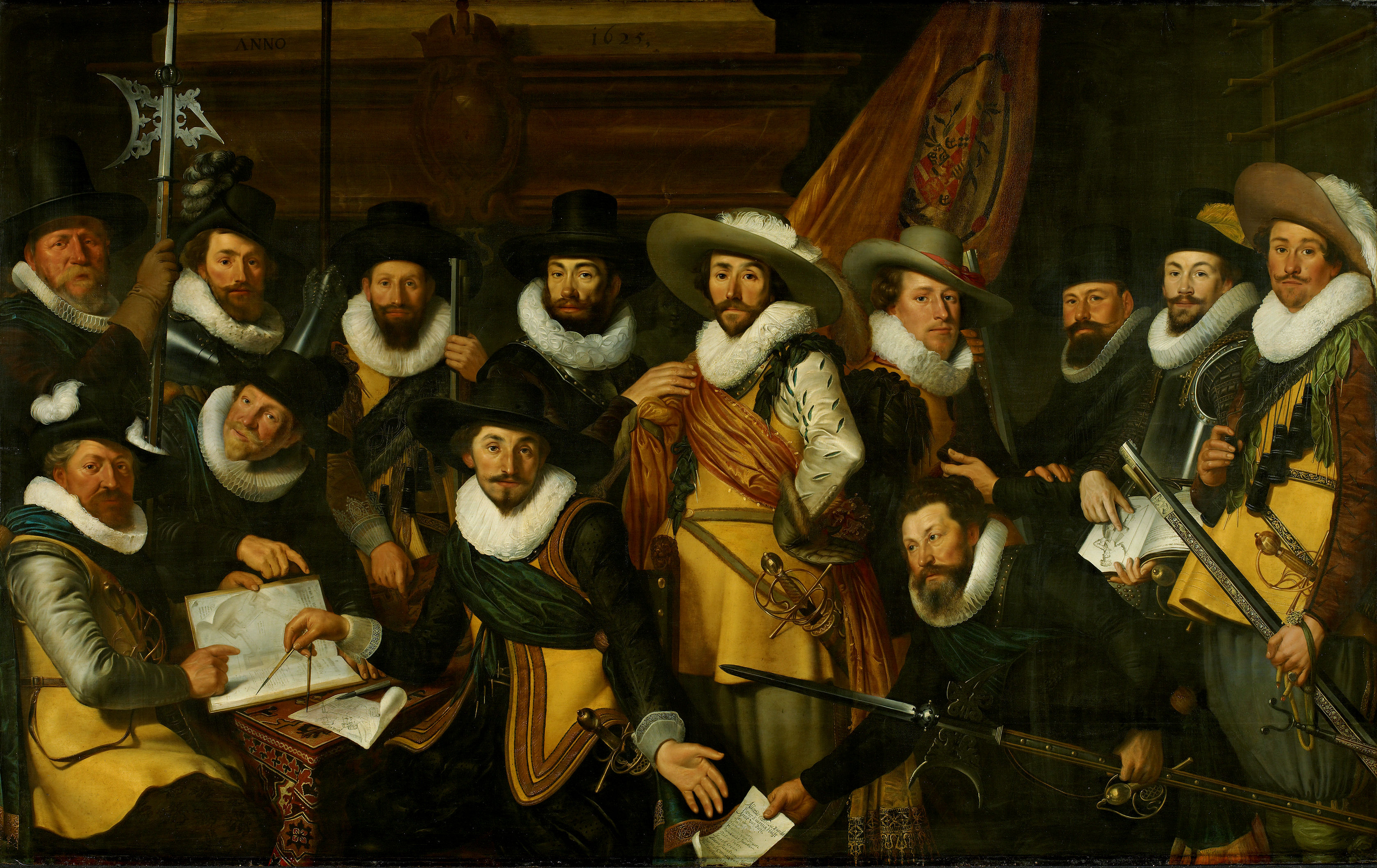
Civic guardsmen of the company of Captain Albert Coenraetsz Burgh and Lieutenant Pieter Evertsz Hulft

He is known for his portraits, mythological and bible scenes and allegorical works. He was a painter as well as a printmaker of etchings and woodcuts. He first known works date from 1612, possibly the year in which he left the workshop of his father-in-law to set up his own workshop.

His surviving paintings are mainly individual and group portraits and historical allegories. His group portraits include regent portraits and schuttersstuken. A few example of these are in the Amsterdam Historical Museum, such as the Civic guardsmen of the company of Captain Albert Coenraetsz Burgh and Lieutenant Pieter Evertsz Hulft (1625). In this schutterstuk the ensign is placed in the center thus dividing the composition in two. The group of men is connected by the action of the two persons in the lower foreground who are passing the traditional list of names of the depicted militiamen. Captain Albert Coenraetsz Burgh (1593–1647) and his lieutenant, the brewer Pieter Evertsz Hulft (1578–1639), are the only ones who are seated, as they were the senior officers.

A Fool embracing a Girl

Most of his etchings date to in or around 1612, with the exception of the etching dated 1618 depicting Saint Luke, which was made for a special occasion.
