= List of museums in Kharkiv Oblast =

List of museums located in the Kharkiv Oblast, Ukraine.

== Museums in Kharkiv ==
=== Open to the public ===
Name	Location	Brief description	Date of establishment	Image	Ref
Museum of Ceramic Tiles and Sanitary Ware	257a Heroiv Kharkova Avenue	The collection includes over 1,000 items, primarily focused on tiles. A significant portion of the ceramic tiles originate from the Bergenheim Society. Preserved samples also include examples of industrial art tiles by Vasyl Krychevsky. The museum also holds bricks and decorative friezes from Italy and Spain dating to the 20th century, crafted using manual labor.	2003		
Kharkiv Literary Museum	6 Bahaliya Street	The museum presents artistic literature, the history of literature in Slobozhanshchyna, and contemporary literary theory. Its exhibitions and educational programs demonstrate how literature influences people's lives and accumulates the cultural experiences of various communities.	20 April 1988		
Museum of Outstanding Kharkivites named after K. I. Shulzhenko	1 Selyshchyi Lane	Named after the singer Klavdiya Shulzhenko, the museum holds numerous items and memorabilia related to her. It regularly hosts memorial and poetry evenings.	26 May 1996		
AVEC Gallery	72 Sumska Street (temporarily)	A private gallery that hosts various events and thematic exhibitions featuring items from around the world.	2000		

=== Temporarily closed due to the full-scale invasion ===
Name	Location	Brief description	Date of establishment	Image	Ref
State Museum of Nature of V. N. Karazin Kharkiv National University	8 Trinklera Street	A natural history museum and one of the oldest in Europe. It is part of V. N. Karazin Kharkiv National University and serves as a major scientific, educational, and outreach center in Ukraine.	2 April 1807		
Kharkiv Maritime Museum	13 Zhon Myronosyts Street	Dedicated to the history of shipbuilding and navigation, the museum’s main collection is based on a private collection by Kharkiv resident Oleksandr Yakymenko. It features ship models, photographs, paintings, and souvenirs from various countries.	3 June 2009		
Museum of Archaeology and Ethnography of Slobid Ukraine	8 Trinklera Street	The archaeological museum became an independent institution in 1919, having separated from the State Museum of Nature of V. N. Karazin Kharkiv National University. The museum holds a collection of artifacts from the Bronze Age, Scythian period, Antiquity, Chernyakhiv and Saltiv cultures.	1919		
Museum of Women's and Gender History	124a Heroiv Kharkova Avenue	The museum collects and preserves exhibits that demonstrate the process of gender construction and societal manipulation of gender. It is the first and only gender (women’s) museum in Ukraine, the post-Soviet space, and Eastern Europe.	March 2008		
Museum of History and Railway Technology of the Southern Railway	1 Pryvokzalna Square, Northern Terminal of Kharkiv-Passenger Station	The museum's collection comprises over 2,000 items, with 500 on display, along with 36 pieces of railway equipment exhibited outdoors. The collection includes rare and historical items, unique documents and photographs—such as a handcart and tools used in building the railway through Kharkiv, a late 19th-century "Ericsson" wall telephone in a wooden case, railway company bonds, tickets and IDs from the Russian Empire era, and models of rolling stock.	1967		
Museum of the History of the Kharkiv Emergency Medical Service Station	41 Kontorska Street	Located in the building of the Emergency Medical Station Administration, built in 1914. Before the station’s establishment, Mykola Oleksandrovych Molokhov was appointed senior physician, organizing and equipping the station and remaining its head until his death. He created a museum in the central dispatch room that housed anatomical specimens, weapons, and poisons used by suicides. After his death in 1956, the exhibits disappeared. In 2000, the station’s staff restored and re-established the museum.	2000		
Museum of Sexual Cultures	81a Myronosytska Street	The first of its kind in the post-Soviet space and Eastern Europe, the museum presents the sexual cultures of different countries around the world. Special attention is given to the prevention of sexually transmitted diseases, particularly AIDS.	1999		
M. F. Sumtsov Kharkiv Historical Museum	5 Universytetska Street	The museum's collection includes over 300,000 items representing the archaeological past, the 17th to 20th centuries, and contemporary regional history. It conducts extensive scholarly and educational activities and is one of the leading scientific and cultural centers of Eastern Ukraine.	21 January 1920		
Kharkiv Art Museum	11 Zhon Myronosyts Street	One of the largest fine arts museums in Ukraine, with a substantial collection of visual and applied arts from Ukraine and Western countries. The museum is housed in the former estate of millionaire industrialist Ihnatyshchev, built in 1912 based on a design by architect Oleksiy Beketov.	1920		
Kharkiv Holocaust Museum	28 Yaroslav Mudryi Street	The first non-governmental Holocaust museum in Ukraine. The museum houses around 3,000 exhibits and includes a library on the Holocaust. One section is dedicated to Jewish resistance during World War II, including uprisings in Auschwitz and other camps. The museum also addresses the issue of post-war silencing of Jewish tragedy.	1996		
Museum of the Kharkiv School of Photography	17 Yahotynskyi Lane, on the grounds of the "Manometr" plant	The first museum of contemporary Ukrainian photography, founded in 2018. Its mission is to preserve, study, and promote modern Ukrainian photography. The museum’s collection includes over 2,500 photographs by more than 40 authors.	2018		
Museum of the History of V. N. Karazin Kharkiv National University	4 Svobody Square, 2nd floor, V. N. Karazin Kharkiv National University	The museum's holdings comprise about 20,000 items, 10,000 photo negatives, and 16,000 digital images. The collection includes graduation photo albums from the late 19th to early 21st centuries, badges, medals, recorded interviews with alumni and staff, and personal collections of 233 prominent scholars and university affiliates, such as D. I. Bahalii, M. P. Barabashov, and O. V. Vetukhiv.	30 December 1972		
Kharkiv Puppet Museum	24 Constitution Square	The oldest puppet museum in Ukraine. It showcases the history of puppet theatre and features a collection of puppets and badges from around the world.	5 October 1954		
Memorial Flat-Museum of the Gryzodubov Family	54 Myronosytska Street	The museum is located in the apartment where the Gryzodubov family lived and contains exhibits related to the lives of Valentyna and Stepan Gryzodubov.	1970		
Software and Computer Museum	79/1 Hryhorii Skovoroda Street, Dormitory "Giant"	The museum presents exhibits related to the development of computer systems and technologies.			

=== Permanently closed ===
Name	Location	Brief description	Date	Image	Ref
Kharkiv Private Museum of Urban Estate	43 Myronosytska Street	The museum held exhibitions on the local history and architecture of Kharkiv.	2002		
Kharkiv Art and Industrial Museum	Serhiivskyi Square, Novo-Serhiivskyi Row, upper floor	The first urban public museum in Ukraine and one of the first in the Russian Empire. Founded on 14 (26) December 1886 by writer and public figure G. Danilevsky with support from the Kharkiv City Duma. In 1920, its collection was transferred to the Museum of Sloboda Ukraine named after H. Skovoroda (now M. F. Sumtsov Kharkiv Historical Museum), after which the museum was closed permanently. Over 25 artworks from its collection are preserved in the Kharkiv Art Museum.	14 (26) December 1886 – 1920		
Museum of Church Antiquities	4 Mystetstv Street	Housed old icons, books, iconostasis carvings, church utensils, wooden sculptures, etc. Closed following the Bolshevik occupation of the city. During the Soviet occupation, most exhibits were lost.	1912–1919		
Kharkiv Regional Anti-Religious Museum	2 Hohol Street	An institution of Soviet anti-religious propaganda, established in 1930 in a former Lutheran church. It had 5 exhibition halls with 600 exhibits. The museum ceased to exist in June 1941.	1930–1941	Former church, where the Kharkiv Regional Anti-Religious Museum was opened in 1939	

== Memorial museums ==
Name	Location	Brief description	Date of establishment	Image	Ref
Ilya Repin Historical and Memorial Museum	Chuhuiv, 8 Muzeina Street	A historical and art museum dedicated to Ilya Yukhymovych Repin, located in his birthplace of Chuhuiv, in the estate where he lived.	1969		
Hnat Khotkevych Memorial House Museum	Vysokyi settlement, 10 Horkoho Street	A room-museum in the former estate of Hnat Martynovych Khotkevych — Ukrainian writer, art historian, ethnographer, bandura player, and public figure.	2005		
National Museum of Military History of Slobozhanshchyna	Solonytsivka settlement, north of the village along Nadiia Street	A memorial complex with a museum dedicated to World War II, the Afghan War, and the Russian-Ukrainian War, located at the former observation post at an altitude of 197.3 meters. The exhibition includes military equipment from various periods, weapons, uniforms, etc. The site also features a museum, obelisk, monuments, and a chapel.	1975		
Prykolotne Museum of Hero of the Soviet Union K. F. Olshansky	Prykolotne settlement	A museum dedicated to the landing party under the command of Konstantin Fyodorovich Olshansky.	1964		

== Rural museums ==
Name	Location	Brief description	Date of establishment
Museum of Combat Brotherhood	Sokolove village	A museum dedicated to commemorating the battles in Sokolove (Zmiiv district, Kharkiv Oblast), where in 1943, during World War II, Czechoslovak volunteers of the 1st Separate Czechoslovak Battalion, led by Colonel Ludvík Svoboda, first fought against Nazi forces.	1958
National Literary and Memorial Museum of H. S. Skovoroda	Skovorodynivka	A museum dedicated to the life and work of philosopher Hryhorii Skovoroda, located in an 18th-century manor where he lived. The collection includes several thousand items. The 18.2-hectare complex features national landmarks in history, architecture, monumental, and landscape art from the 18th century. On May 6, 2022, the museum building was destroyed by a direct hit from a Russian missile.	1972
V. O. Babenko Historical and Archaeological Museum-Reserve "Verkhnii Saltiv"	Verkhnii Saltiv village	A historical and archaeological museum-reserve. Artifacts from the Verkhnii Saltiv archaeological complex — pottery, fishing gear, textile tools, weapons, jewelry, and other household items — are exhibited in museums across Kyiv, Kharkiv, Odesa, Moscow, Saint Petersburg, and Sofia. Only a small portion remains in the Verkhnii Saltiv museum.	1899 or 1900
Parkhomivka Historical and Art Museum	Parkhomivka village	Considered one of the finest rural museums in Ukraine, it boasts a unique collection of art and antiquities. The museum holds a rare collection of painting and graphic art from the 18th to 20th centuries. Exhibits include icons and works by renowned artists such as Ilya Repin, Serhii Vasylkivsky, Ivan Aivazovsky, Taras Shevchenko, Mikhail Vrubel, Ivan Shishkin, Karl Bryullov, Wassily Kandinsky, Kazimir Malevich, who lived nearby, Valentin Serov, Abram Arkhipov, Oleksandr Holovin, Orest Kiprensky, Isaac Levitan, Alexandre Benois, Nicholas Roerich, and Alexander Ivanov. Among the most valuable items are paintings by Dutch masters like van Ruisdael, van Dyck, and de Hooch, as well as engravings by the 18th-century Italian master Giovanni Piranesi. The museum also holds rare works by Pablo Picasso — including two paintings (one being the globally renowned Dove of Peace) and two samples of Picasso’s ceramics.	1955

== Regional Local History Museums ==
- Balakliia Regional Museum of Local History
- Barvinkove Museum of Local History
- Bohodukhiv Museum of Local History
- Valky Museum of Local History
- Velykyi Burluk Museum of Local History
- Vovchansk Historical and Local History Museum
- Dvorichna Museum of Local History
- Zachepylivka Historical and Local History Museum
- Zmiiv Museum of Local History
- Zolochiv Historical and Local History Museum
- Izium Museum of Local History
- Pechenihy District Museum of Local History
- Museum of Local History in Slobozhanske
- Berestove Museum of Local History named after P. D. Martynovych
- Krasnopavlivka People's Museum of Local History
- Kupiansk Museum of Local History
- Lozova Museum of Local History
- Liubotyn City Museum of Local History
- Zlatopil Museum of Local History
- Sakhnovshchyna Museum of Local History
- Shevchenkove Museum of Local History
- Museum of the History of Znamenka
- Verkhno-Byshkino Museum of Local History
