= Van Ruisdael =

van Ruisdael can refer to:

- Jacob van Ruisdael (1629–1682), Dutch painter, draughtsman, and etcher, the most famous artist of the name
- Isaack van Ruisdael (1599 – c. 1677), a Dutch Golden Age painter, brother to Salomon the father of Jacob
- Salomon van Ruysdael (1602–1670) Dutch Golden Age landscape painter. He was the uncle of Jacob van Ruisdael
- Jacob Salomonsz van Ruysdael (1629–1681), the son of Salomon van Ruysdael and the cousin of Jacob Isaakszoon van Ruisdael

== Family tree ==
Jacob de Goyer
Isaack van Ruisdael (1599-1677)	Salomon van Ruysdael (1602-1670
Jacob van Ruisdael (1629 – 1682)	Jacob Salomonsz van Ruysdael (1629 – 1681)
