= Museum of Ceramic Tiles and Sanitary Ware =

Coordinates: 49.9663°N 36.3226°E

- Музей керамічної плитки та сантехніки
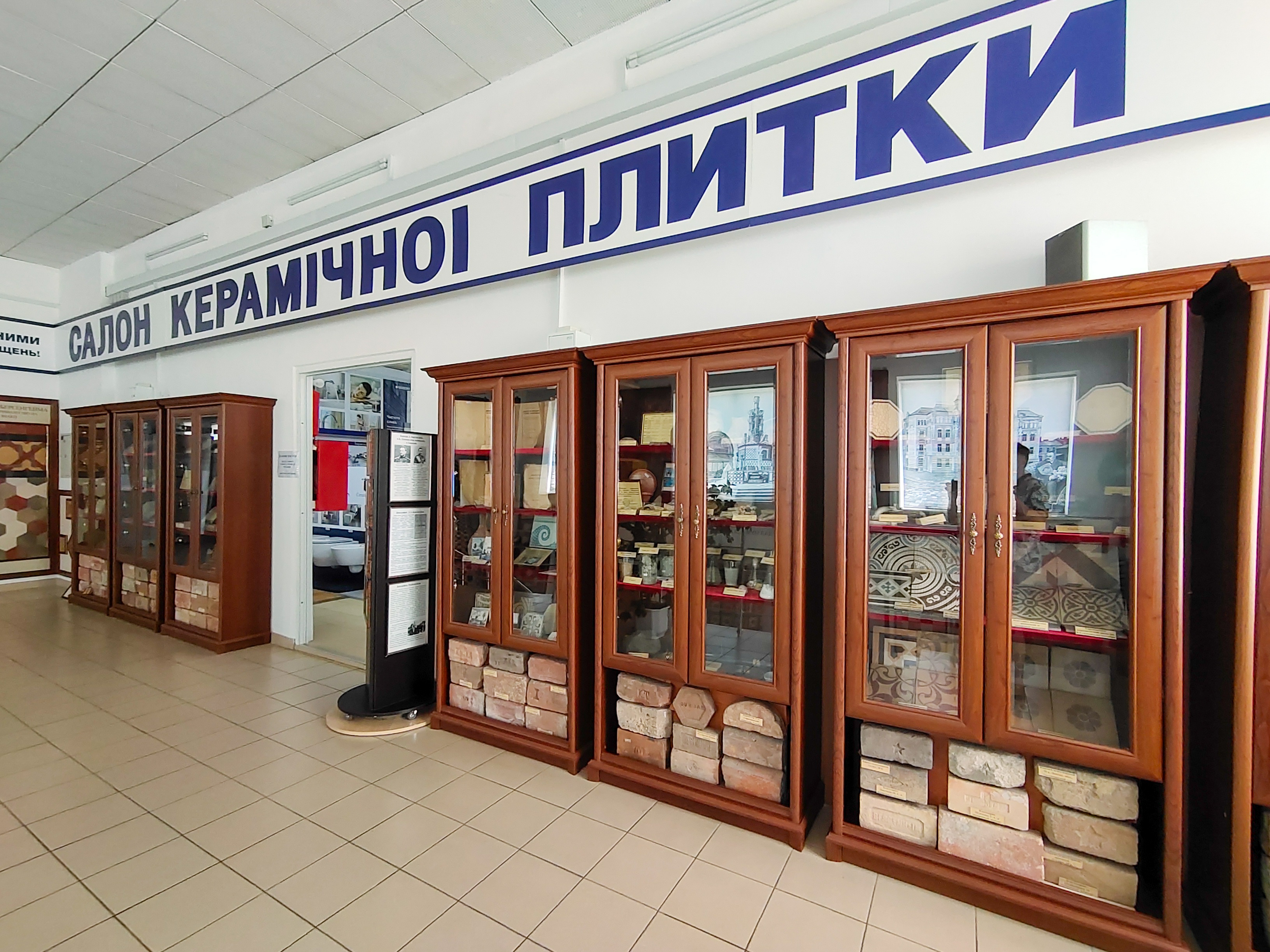
- Established: August 23, 2003
- Location: 257a Heroiv Kharkova Avenue, Kharkiv, Kharkiv Oblast, Ukraine
- Collections: Tiles, bricks, sanitary ware ets
- Collection size: about 3000 exhibits
- Director: Sofia Ivanivna Proskura

The Museum of Ceramic Tiles and Sanitary Ware is a museum dedicated to ceramic products and sanitary ware, as well as their history. It is in the city of Kharkiv, Kharkiv Oblast, at 257a Heroiv Kharkova Avenue. The museum was opened on August 23, 2003.

== History ==
The museum was founded on August 23, 2003. The collection has been assembled based on the principle of preserving items discarded during renovations of houses or rooms. Some of the preserved items were donated by visitors themselves. The appearance in July 2005 of a ceramic stove made by the Vasyl Petrov factory sparked a public scandal. The museum took a stance in favor of preserving the artifact, while some members of the public opposed dismantling the old stove, which was a monument on the Shcherbynin family estate. Sofia Proskura commented on the situation:

The semi-destroyed building where the stove is stored will lead to—has already led to—the fact that only about half of the tiles from this stove remain. And of those 50%, ninety percent are semi-destroyed—they’ve lost their shine and appearance. If we leave them in this condition for another two or three months, the tiles will turn into a pile of rubble, a pile of clay, and nothing else will remain.

== Collection ==
The museum’s collection consists of over 3,000 items. The core of the collection is made up of ceramic tiles. A large portion of the tiles were produced by the Bergenheim Society. Preserved items also include industrial art tiles designed by Vasyl Krychevsky. Other items include bricks, Italian and Spanish decorative friezes from the 20th century made with manual labor, a handmade plinfa brick by master Makostup with a chipped corner, various sanitary ware, and faience. Two full-sized ceramic stoves from the 19th century are also on display. The first dates back to 1894, from the Mogilev Governorate, the second dates to 1840, made by the Petrov Factory in Kharkiv.

== Gallery ==
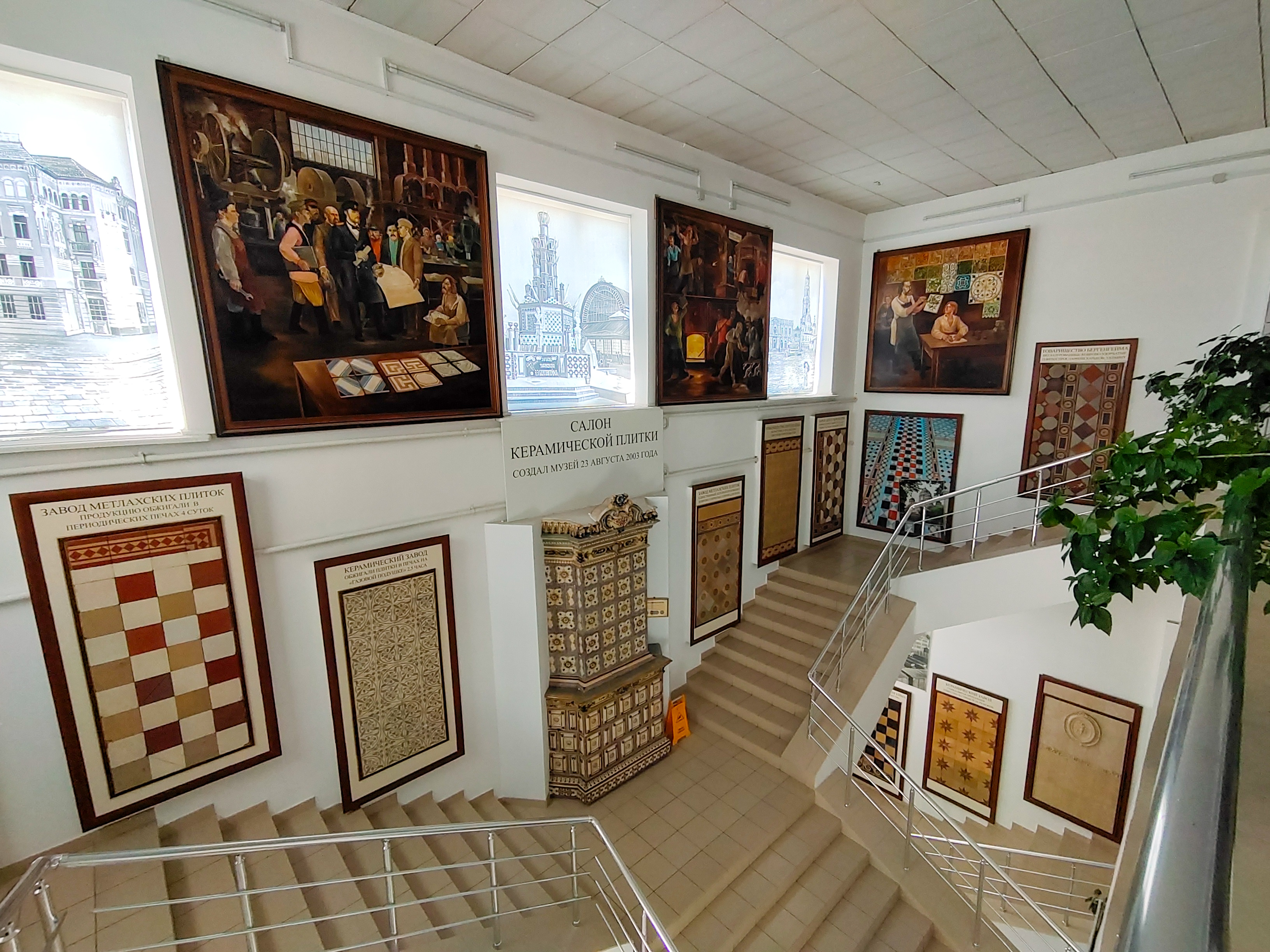

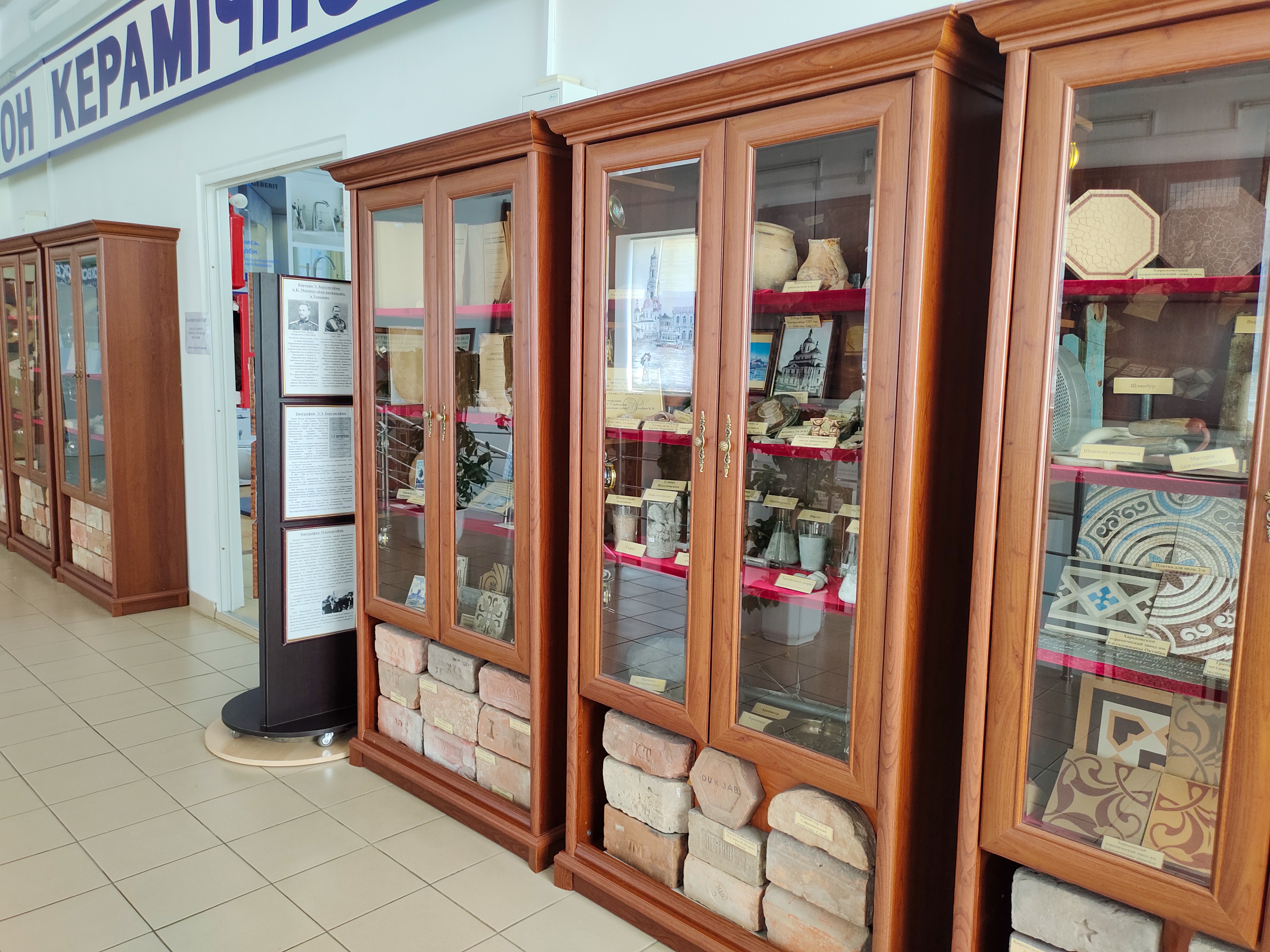

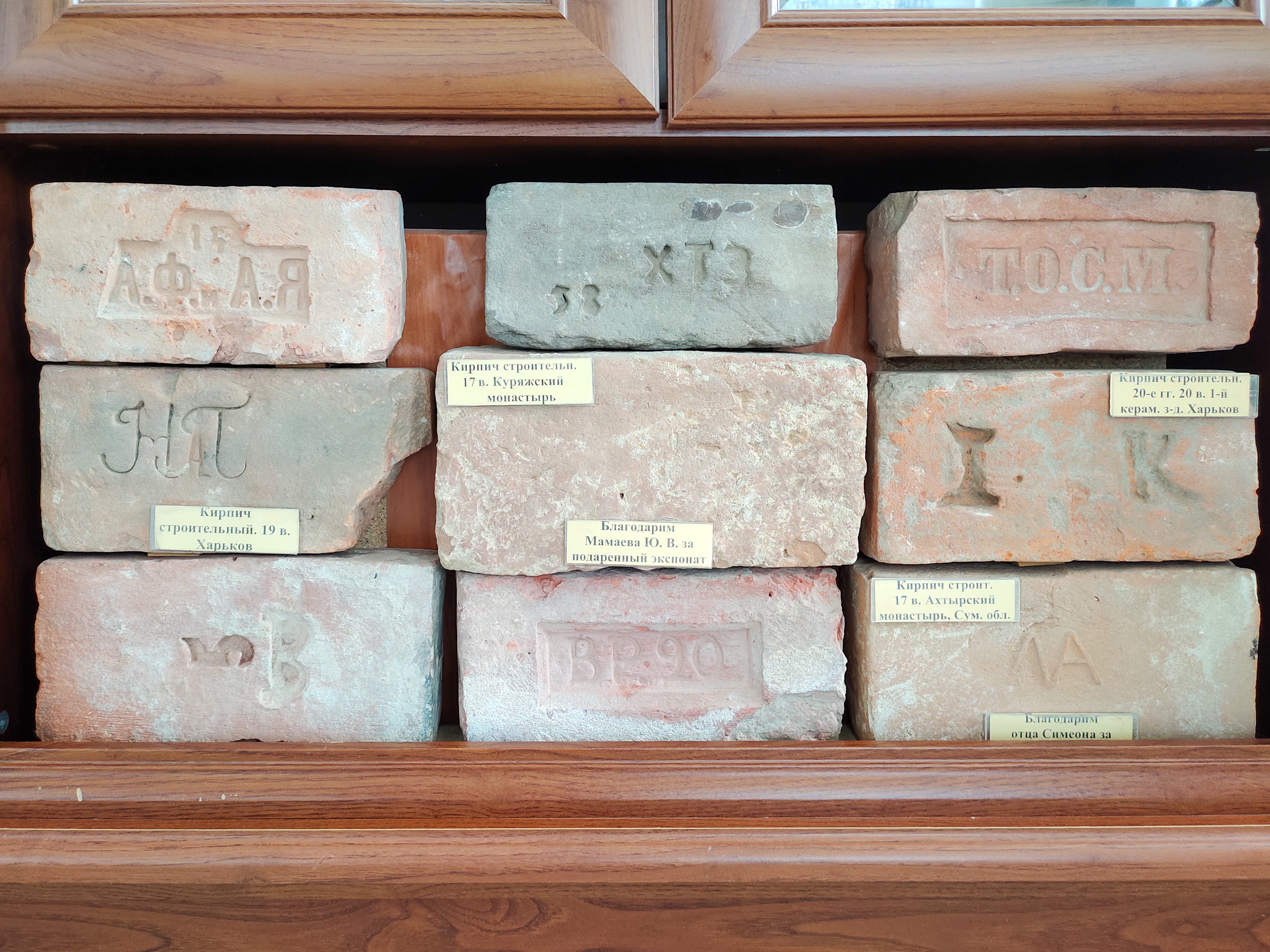

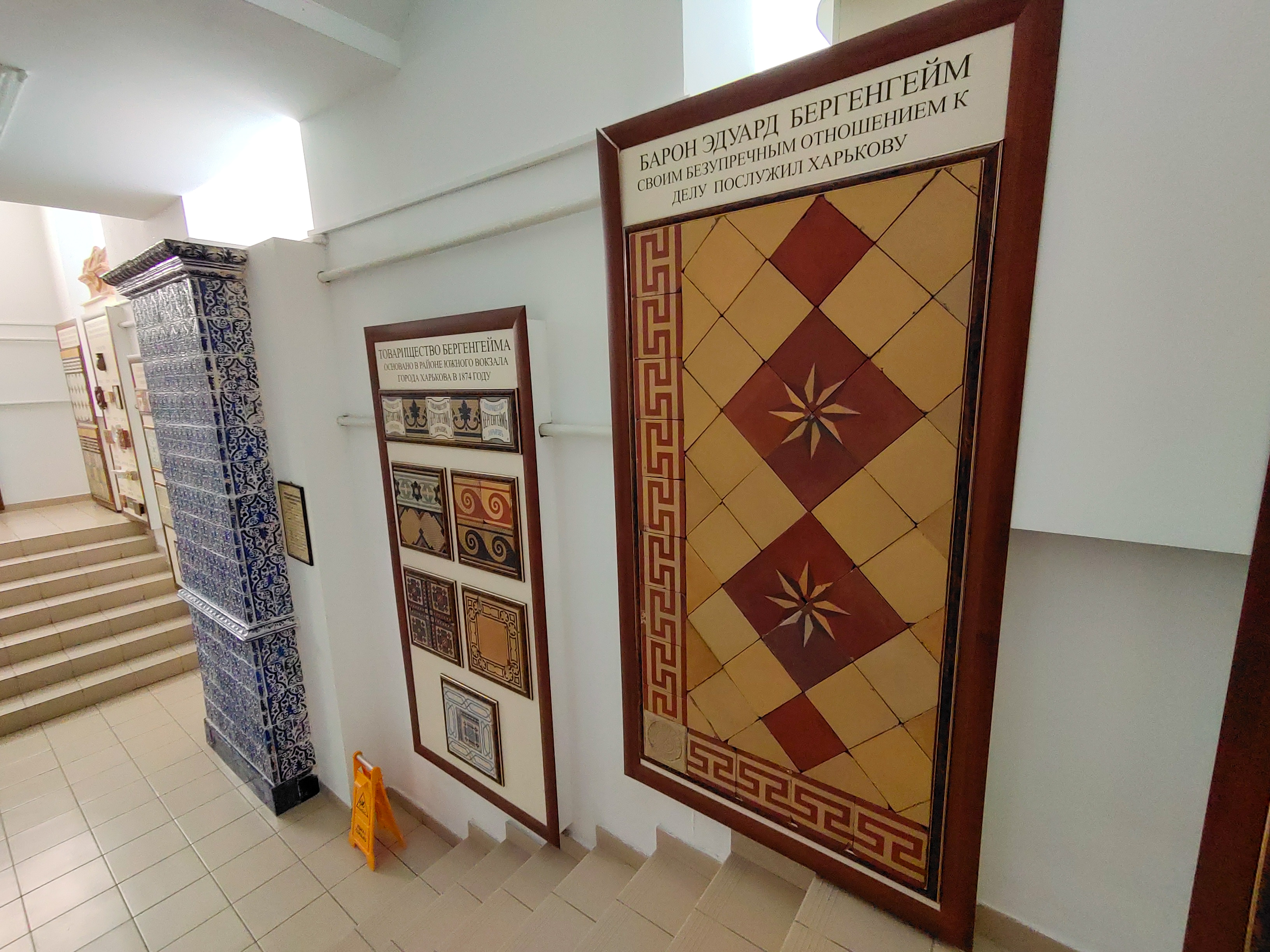

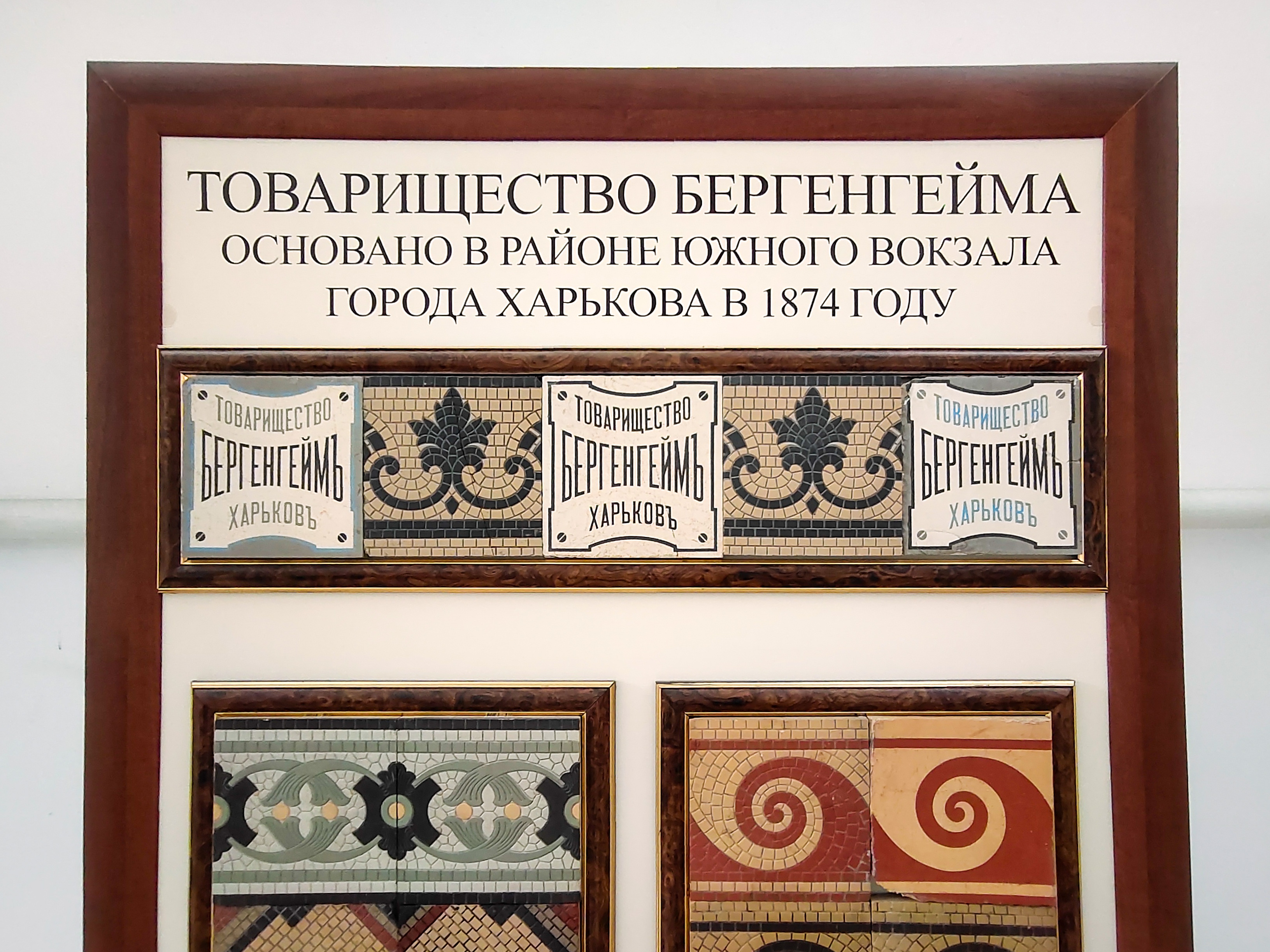

== See also ==
- Edward Ferdinand Bergenheim
- Baron Bergenheim Ceramic and Terracotta Factory
- List of museums in Kharkiv
