= Edward Ferdinand Bergenheim =

Kharkiv industrialist from Finland (1844–1893)

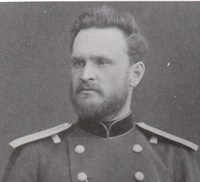
- Children: son Alex, daughter Dorothea
- Awards: Order of Saint Anna

Signature
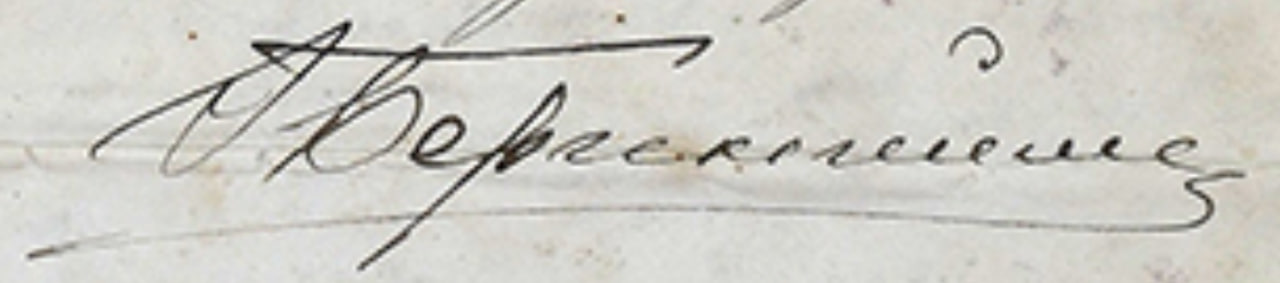

Edward Ferdinand Bergenheim, Baron (Swedish: Edward Ferdinand Bergenheim; Ukrainian: Едвард Фердинанд Берґенгейм, in Russian sources: Eduard Eduardovich Bergenheim (Едуард Едуардович Бергенгейм); 29 January 1844, Åbo, Finland – 28 March 1893, Kharkiv) was an industrialist of Finland Swedish origin based in Kharkiv. He was the founder of the Bergenheim Factory for the production of terracotta and ceramic goods, the first of its kind on the territory of Ukraine under the control of the Russian Empire. Since 1879, he held the title of Baron of the Grand Duchy of Finland.

== Biography ==
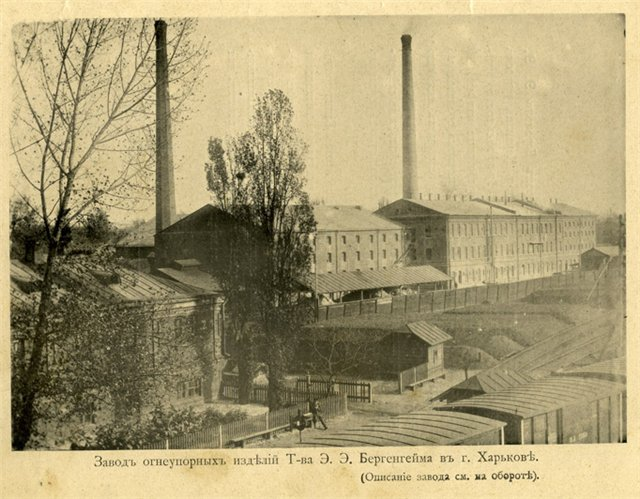
Postcard with a view of Baron Bergenheim's Factory in Kharkiv, Ukraine

Edward Ferdinand was born on 29 January 1844 in the city of Åbo (Grand Duchy of Finland) into the Finland Swedish family of Edvard Bergenheim (1798–1884), Archbishop of Åbo and head of the Evangelical Lutheran Church of Finland from 1850 to 1884, and Alexandrina Bergenheim (née Bruun). He was of Swedish descent through his paternal grandfather, who came from a Swedish family of clergymen. In June 1863, he graduated with distinction from the Finnish Cadet Corps in Fredrikshamn (now Hamina). In 1869, he completed a full course, including an additional division, at the Engineering Academy.

In 1870, he joined the Kursk–Kharkiv–Azov Railway Society. By 1876, he founded the Bergenheim Factory in Kharkiv, which produced ceramic tiles, stoves, and fire bricks.

On 18 March 1878, Edward Ferdinand Bergenheim married Emilia Elisabeth Ekestubbe. The couple had two children: Axel Edward Emanuel (1885–1920) and Dordi Elisabeth Adelaide (1893–1975; married surname: Sundblom). By imperial decree dated 1 (13) April 1879, the son of the Archbishop of Åbo—Engineer-Captain Edward Ferdinand Bergenheim—was elevated, together with his legitimate descendants, to the baronial dignity of the Grand Duchy of Finland. His family was entered into the Matricular of the House of Nobility of the Grand Duchy of Finland in 1888, listed among the baronial families as No. 54.

In 1882, he was transferred to the reserve of the Engineering Corps and assigned as works supervisor for the construction of the Kremenchuk–Romny Railway. From 1887 to 1891, Edward Ferdinand Bergenheim served as a member of the Kharkiv City Duma. On 11 February 1891, he was discharged from the army reserve with the rank of major general, retaining his uniform and pension.

Edward Ferdinand Bergenheim died in Kharkiv on 28 March 1893. His remains were transported to his native city of Turku and buried in the city cemetery.

== Personal life ==
Professor H. I. Lagermark of Kharkiv University, who knew Bergenheim closely, recalled:

In his private life, E. Bergenheim was an extraordinarily simple, polite, and gentle man. Yet this did not in the least prevent him from being firm, even adamant, in matters he considered duties or questions of honor. His gentleness and sense of justice made him genuinely beloved by all the workers at the factory, while his tireless attention to business and remarkable diligence inspired general admiration...

In 1887, Bergenheim's nephew, Carl Gustaf Emil Mannerheim—future Russian and Finnish general, marshal, president of Finland, and the "father of modern Finland"—arrived in Kharkiv. As he was preparing to enter the Nicholas Cavalry School, he required a strong command of the Russian language. Bergenheim arranged for him to be tutored by Imperial Rittmaster Sukhin, who taught the young Carl Gustaf Russian and also introduced him to the life of an army officer in the Russian military. This period is vividly described in Mannerheim’s memoirs and is also well-documented by his biographers.

For deeper language study, I traveled in the summer of 1887 to one of my relatives, Captain and engineer E. F. Bergenheim, who held a high position at a large industrial enterprise in Kharkiv, a vast economic center of Ukraine. One of the Cossack cavalrymen became a close friend and an excellent teacher to me—an educated man who had undergone military training in St. Petersburg. Thanks to his efforts, by autumn I was speaking Russian quite well, though at first, the language was very difficult for me."

== Ceramic products factory ==
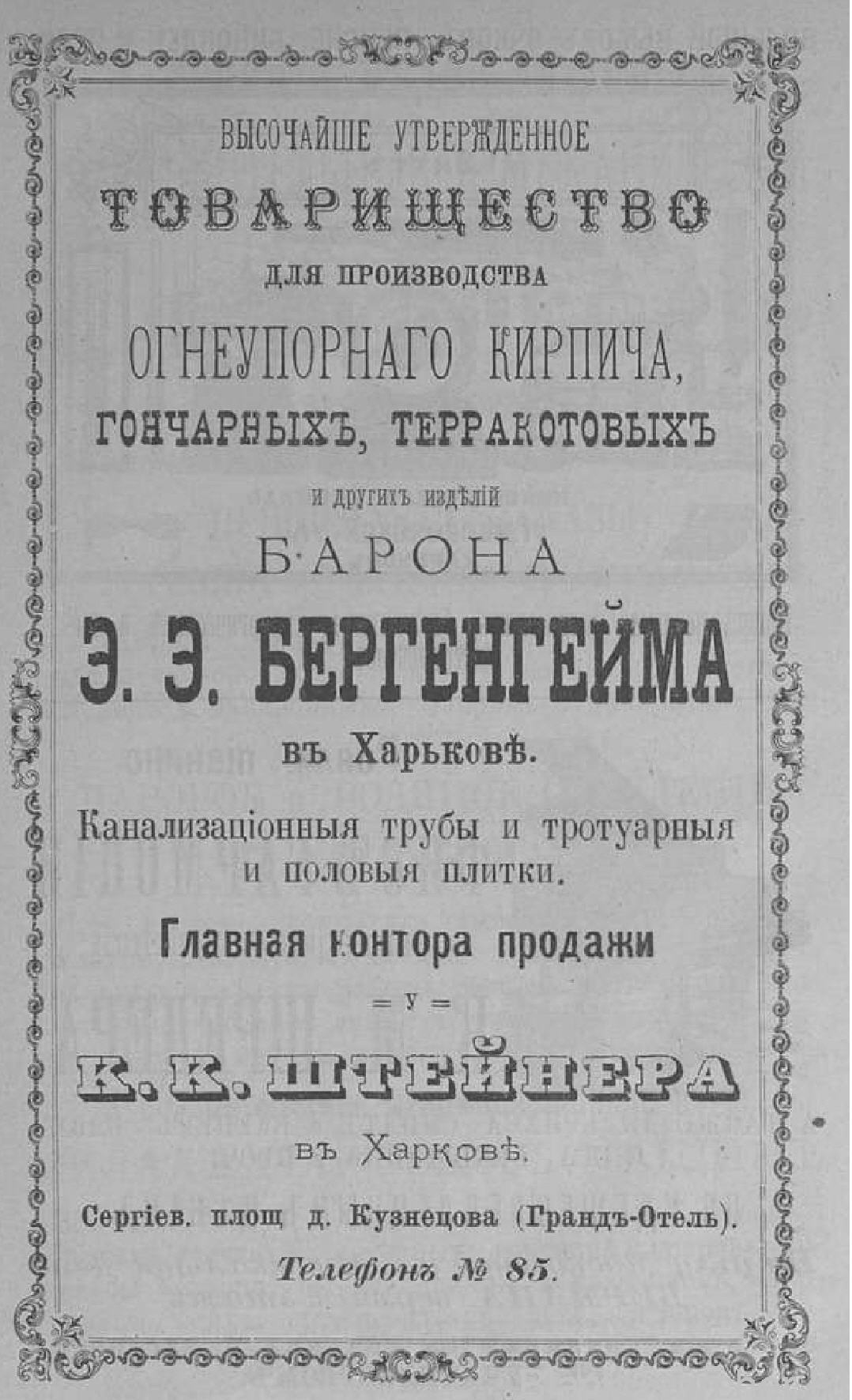
Advertisement for the Bergenheim Society. (1892 рік)

While working on railway construction in the Kharkiv Governorate, Bergenheim became acquainted with the rich clay deposits of the Donbas region. In 1876, he began building a factory in the Zalopan district of Kharkiv for the production of terracotta and other clay-based products. This enterprise was the first of its kind on the territory of Ukraine under Russian Imperial control, and one of the largest in the entire Empire. In 1887, the factory began production of ceramic sewer pipes, and by 1892, it had expanded to manufacture fire- and acid-resistant tiles for floors and pavements. On 16 January 1891, the Society for the Production of Refractory Bricks and Pottery of Baron E. E. Bergenheim was established, with a charter capital of 500,000 rubles. In 1893, the production of stove tiles and roofing tiles was discontinued. On 16 June 1903, a major fire broke out at the factory. By 1909, the "E. E. Bergenheim Society" held capital valued at 152,400 rubles. The Society's administrative office was located in its own income-generating building at 35 Malopanasivska Street (modern Mala Panasivska Street), likely designed in the 1910s by architect Viktor Velychko. Some of the original factory buildings survived, though many were reconstructed during the Soviet era; those that remain are currently being dismantled. The Society's original building and gate have survived, although they are not designated as architectural or historical monuments. Today, the structure houses the Road Clinical Hospital of the Southern Railway. In Kharkiv, the products of Bergenheim’s factory were used in the construction of most buildings; for instance, the floors of the Annunciation Cathedral, the Kazan Church (Lysa Hora), the Church of the Beheading of John the Baptist, and the Goldberg Church are still decorated with Bergenheim tiles. The factory’s products were also used extensively in the construction of many private residences throughout the city. Beyond Kharkiv, Bergenheim’s ceramics became renowned across the entire Ukraine, Russia, Belarus etc. His tiles were used in such prestigious projects as the Livadia Palace (Livadiya), the “House with Chimaeras” (Kyiv), and railway stations in Moscow. Numerous mansions, apartment buildings, and government structures across the Empire were clad with tiles stamped with “Baron Bergenheim.”

During the Soviet era, the factory was nationalized and renamed the Ceramic Factory of the 8th Anniversary of October. In 2003, the Museum of Ceramic Tiles and Sanitary Ware was established in Kharkiv, featuring an extensive collection of Bergenheim factory products, including patterned floor tiles, paving slabs, and fireproof bricks. On the facade of a building at 12 Maika Johansena Street, a tile bearing the factory’s trademark has been installed beneath a heritage plaque.

In the spring of 2024, the dismantling of factory buildings erected in 1890 to the design of Edward Ferdinand Bergenheim began. In June of the same year, preparations commenced to document for protected status for the structures. On 13 March 2025, the partially dismantled buildings were officially added to the list of newly identified immovable cultural heritage sites of Ukraine.

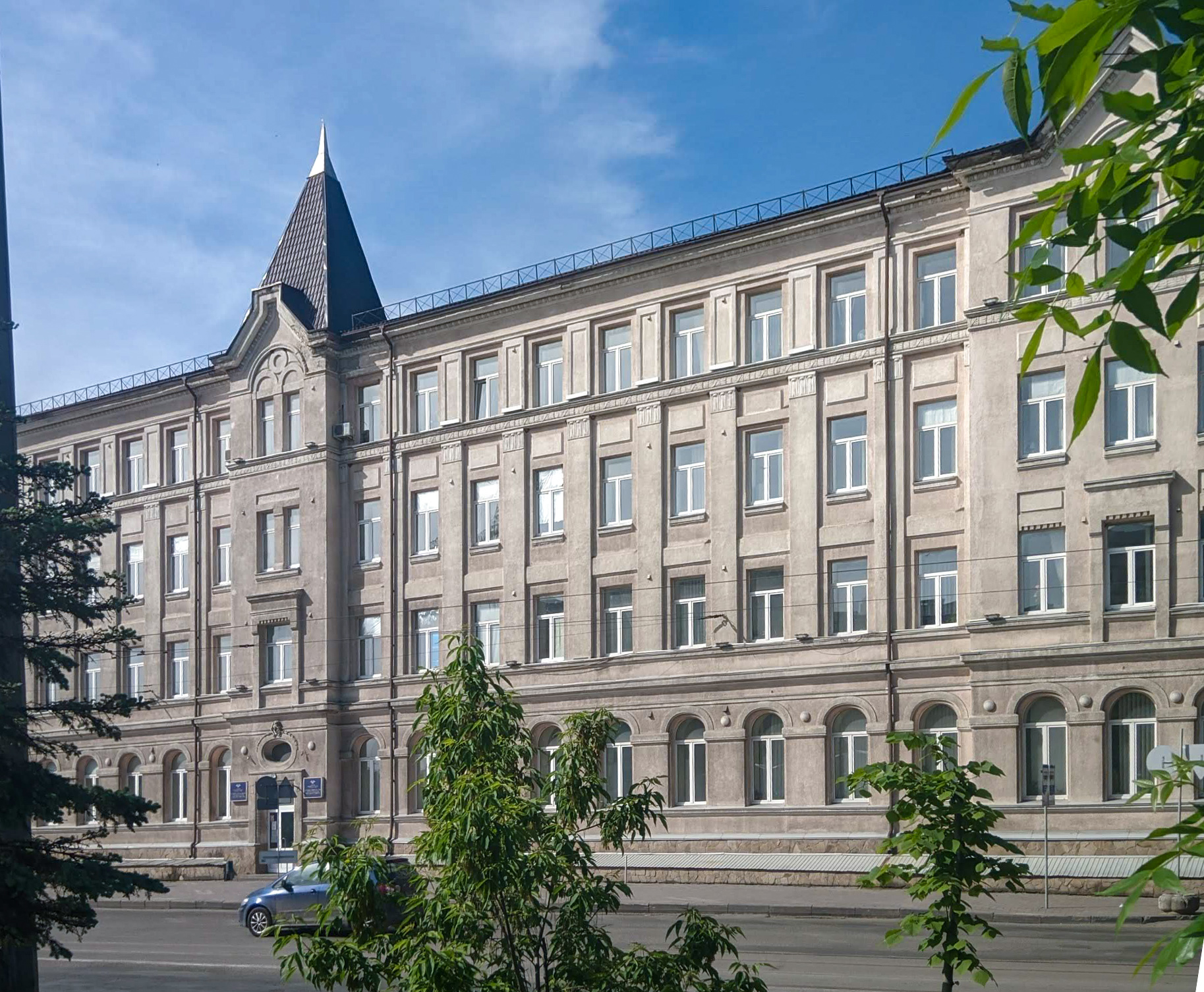
The Bergenheim factory's commercial building on Mala Panasivska Street in Kharkiv

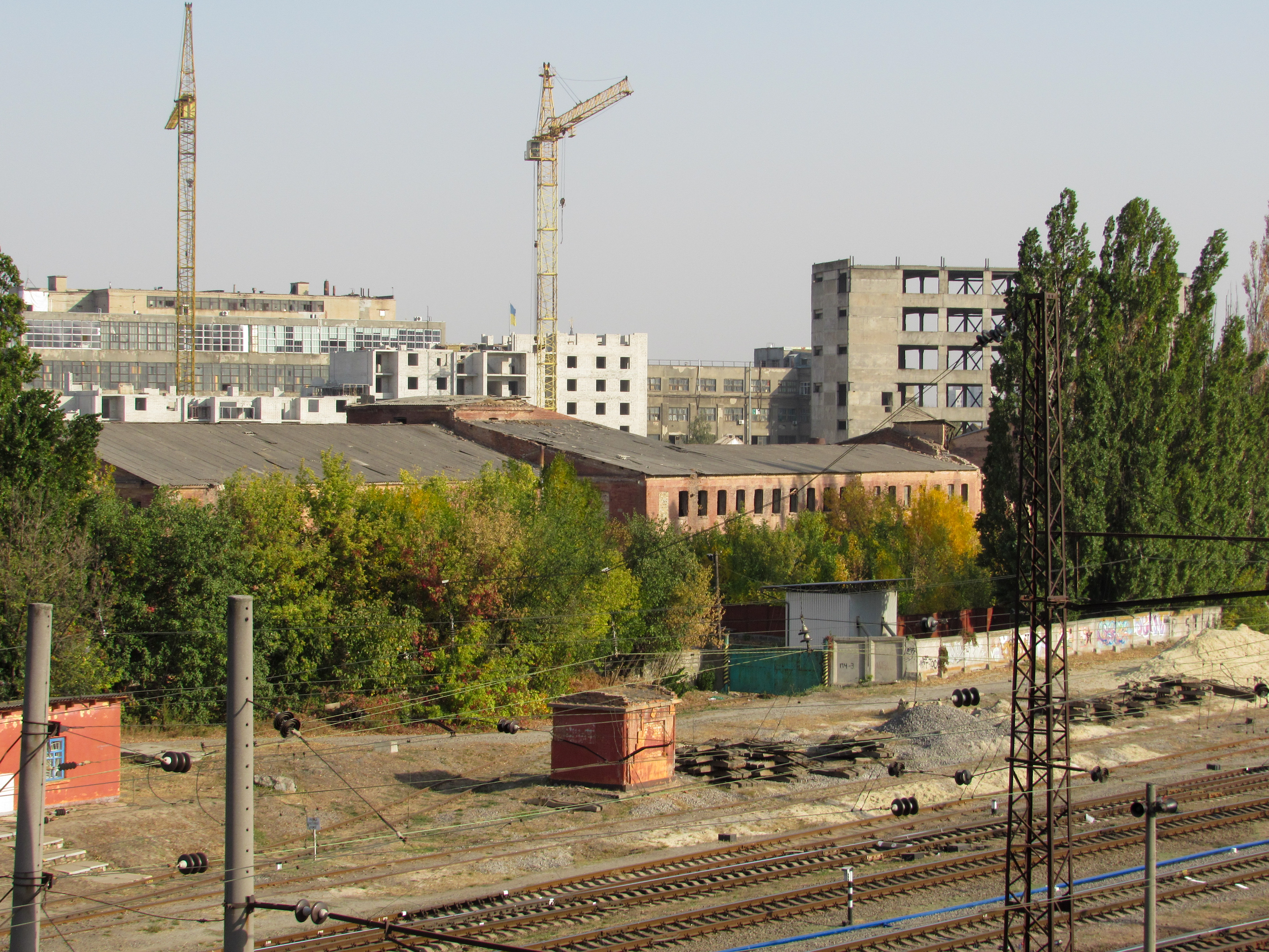
Baron Bergenheim's factory buildings

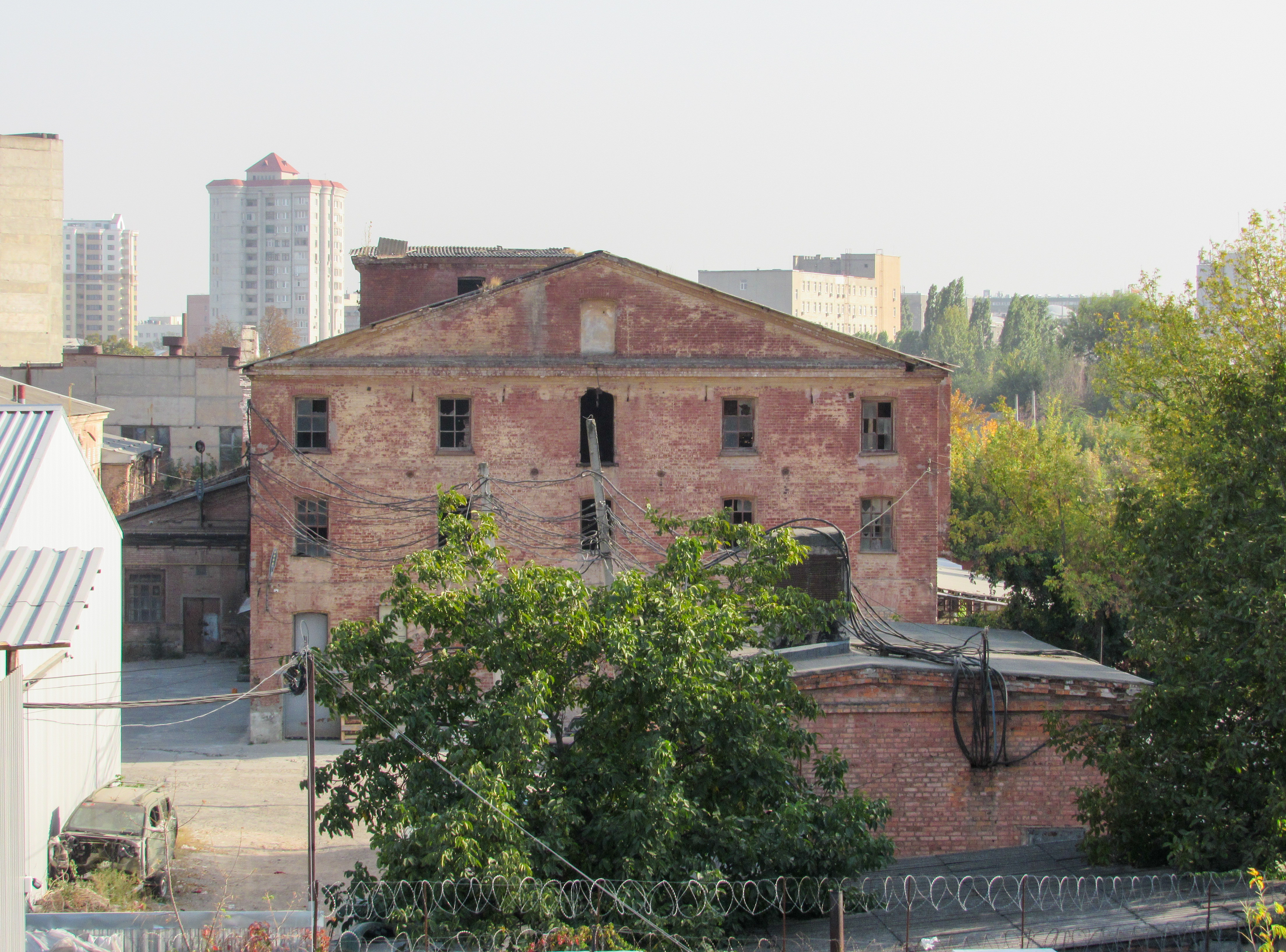
Baron Bergenheim's factory buildings

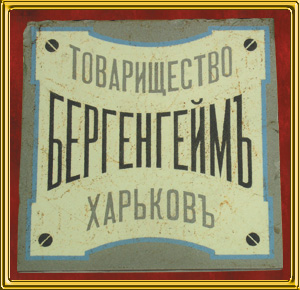
Tile with the emblem of the Bergenheim Society

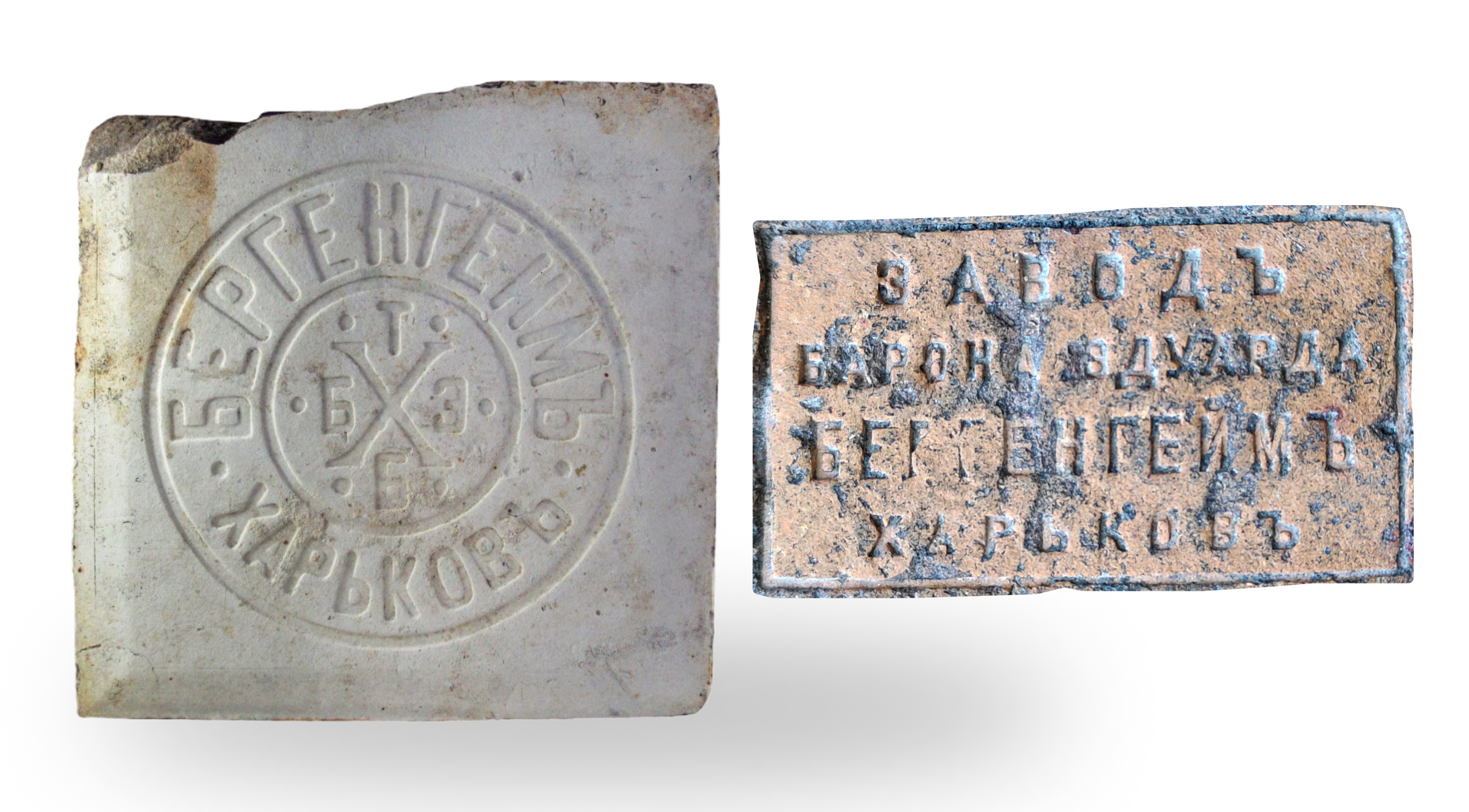
The mark of the Bergenheim Society (left, between 1891 and 1917) and the Bergenheim factory (right, before 1891)

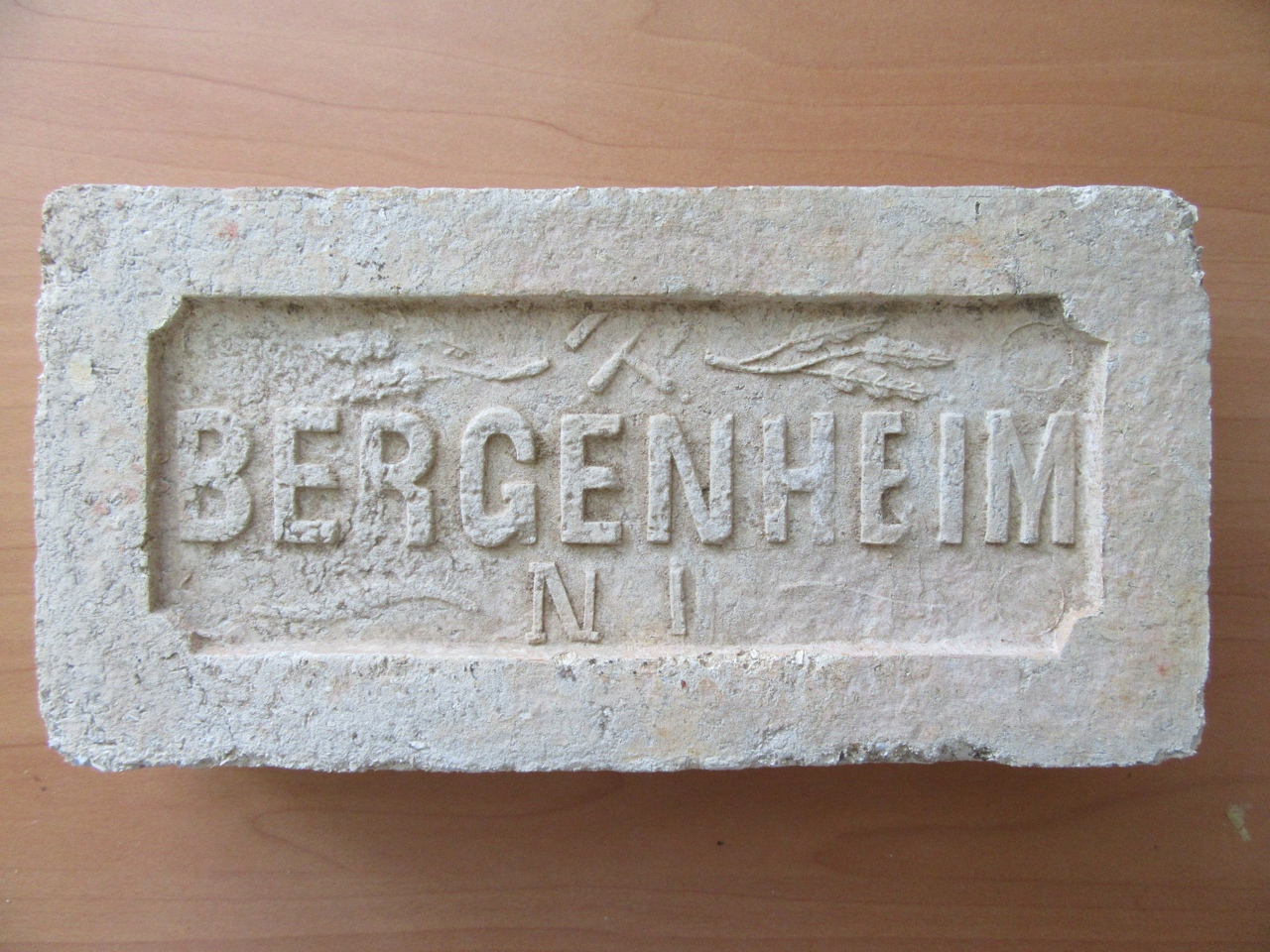
Fire brick from Baron Bergenheim's factory

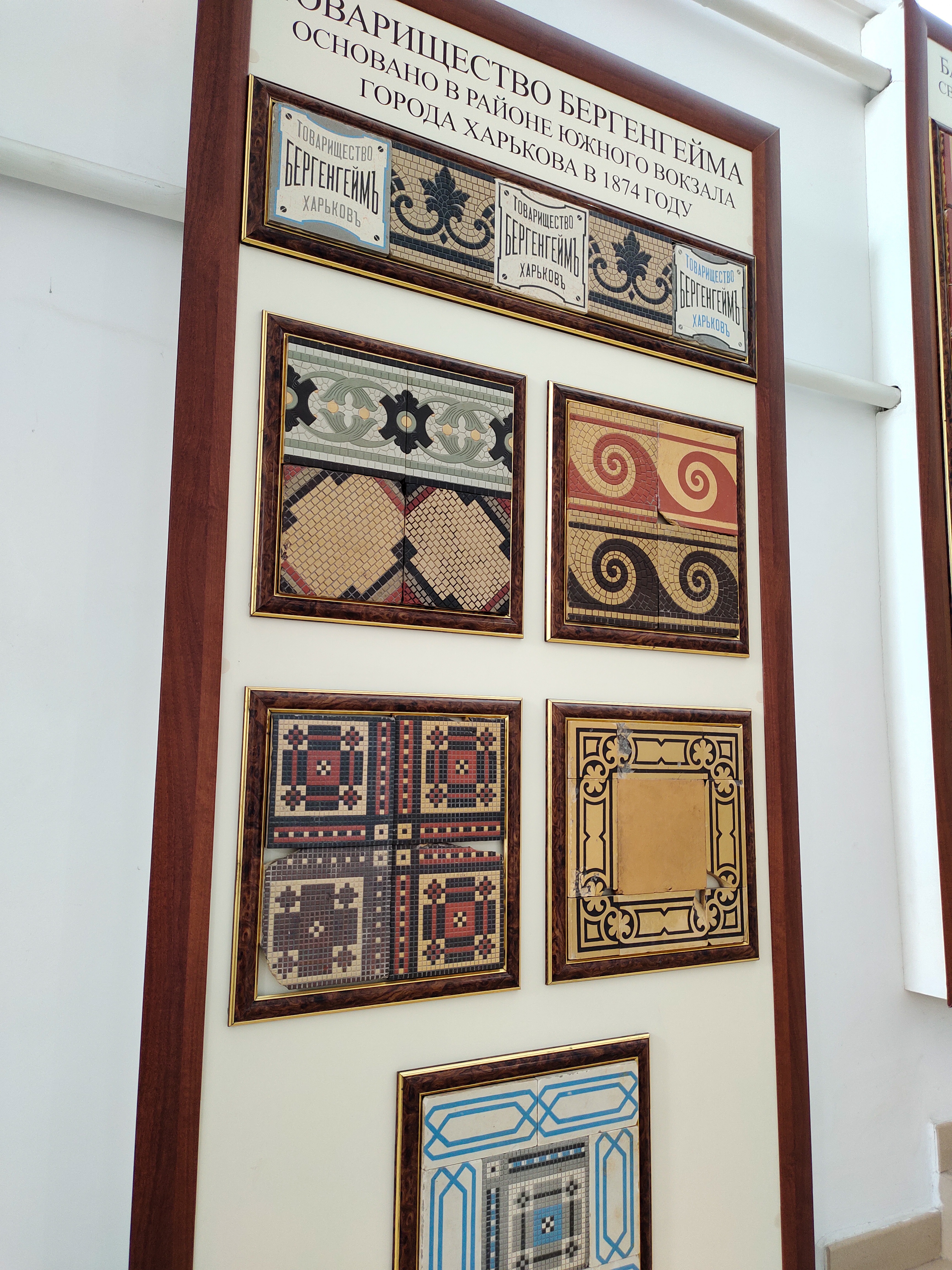
One of the stands with the factory's products in the museum

== See also ==
- Baron Bergenheim Ceramic and Terracotta Factory
- Museum of Ceramic Tiles and Sanitary Ware

== Sources ==
- "Завод барона Берґенгейма". Харківська мапа. October 27, 2024.
- Paramonov, Andriy (November 20, 2020). "Прогулки по Харькову с Андреем Парамоновым. Завод Эдуарда Бергенгейма". Kharkiv Today.
- Nikolsky, Georgy (April 29, 2016). "Прославившие Харьков: Э.Э.Бергенгейм". Livejournal.
- Маннергейм К. Г. Мемуары. — Minsk : Вагриус, 1999. — 508 p. — ISBN 5-264-00049-2.
- Маннергейм К. Г. Воспоминания. — Minsk : ООО «Попурри», 2004. — 512 p. — ISBN 985-483-063-2.
- Solovyov V.O., Raenko L.V. Харьков. Энциклопедический словарь. — Kharkiv., 2014. — 1021 с.
