= Jacob Salomonsz van Ruysdael =

Dutch Golden Age landscape painter

Jacob Salomonsz. van Ruysdael (1629, Haarlem – 1681, Haarlem) was a Dutch Golden Age landscape painter who was the son of Salomon van Ruysdael and the cousin of the more famous Jacob Isaakszoon van Ruisdael.

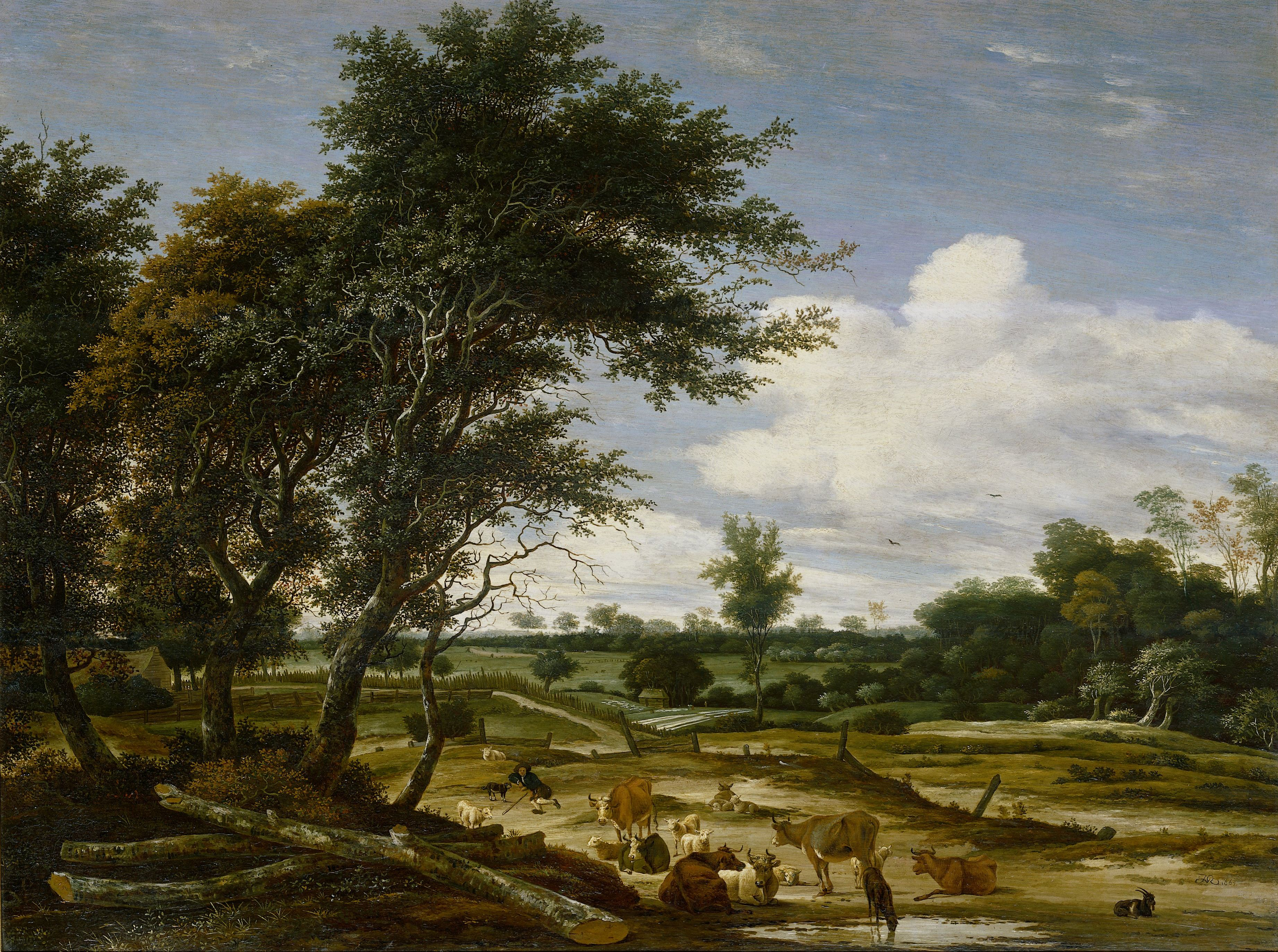
Landschap met herder en vee Rijksmuseum SK-A-1525

== Biography ==
The contemporary biographer Arnold Houbraken mixed up the various members of the Ruisdael family and assumed that all of their landscapes were the works of two brothers Jacob and Salomon, when in fact there were four painters; the brothers Isaack and Salomon, and their two sons who were confusingly both named Jacob and lived during the same period.

According to the Netherlands Institute for Art History (Dutch abbreviation, RKD), this Jacob was the son of Salomon van Ruysdael, who was a follower of his father and his more famous cousin, the other Jacob who was the son of Isaack van Ruisdael. Since his works are stylistically similar, his works are sometimes confused with those of his father and cousin. In the summer of 1666 he moved to Amsterdam where he became a member of the Anabaptist community there in the same year. A record shows him as the widower of Geertruy Pieters when he became engaged to Annetje Jans Colyn in 1673.

When he died he was buried in the Sint Anna cemetery in Haarlem. The St. Anna cemetery was all that remained of the old St. Anna cloister that had been seized by the Protestant Haarlem city governors after the Spanish occupation in 1581. By the time van Ruysdael died, the old St. Anna church had been replaced by the Nieuwe Kerk, which was completed in 1648 and still exists today. The cemetery presumably came into the hands of the Protestants at that time and was therefore not a Catholic burial ground, but a municipal burial ground. It was cleared of graves in 1706.
