= Baron Bergenheim Ceramic and Terracotta Factory =

Coordinates: 49.9962°N 36.2043°E

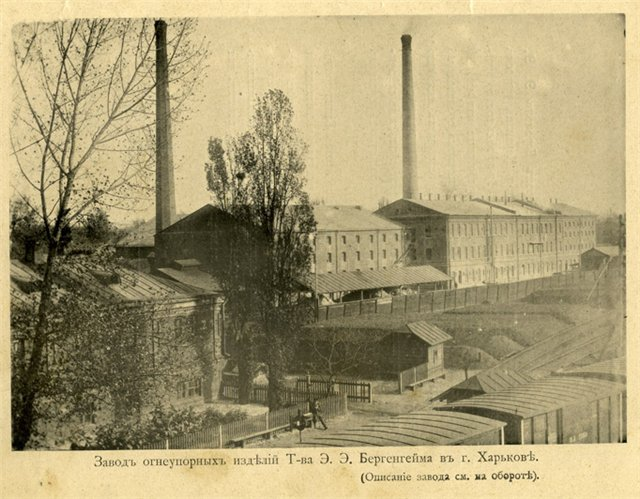
- Postcard with a view of Baron Bergenhayn's Factory from the early 20th century
- Interactive map of Baron Bergenheim Ceramic and Terracotta Factory
- Location: 67 Velyka Panasivska Street, Kharkiv, Ukraine
- Designer: Edward Ferdinand Bergenheim
- Builder: Edward Ferdinand Bergenheim
- Type: factory
- Material: brick, reinforced concrete
- Beginning date: 1876
- Completion date: 1890
- Dismantled date: second half of the 20th century (dismantling of pipes and minor extensions); 2024-2025 (partial destruction of buildings).

The Baron Bergenheim Ceramic and Terracotta Factory, known since 1891 as the Society for the Production of Fireproof Bricks and Pottery of Baron E. E. Bergenheim, was a former industrial enterprise and recently recognized cultural heritage site located in the Zalopan district of central Kharkiv, Ukraine. It was founded in 1876 by engineer and Baron of the Grand Duchy of Finland, Edward Ferdinand Bergenheim, son of Archbishop Edward Bergenheim, head of the Evangelical Lutheran Church of Finland. The present-day factory buildings, recently listed as immovable cultural heritage sites of Ukraine, were constructed in 1890 based on the designs of the factory's owner himself. On Mala Panasivska Street stands the factory's income-generating apartment building, likely constructed in 1912.

== History ==
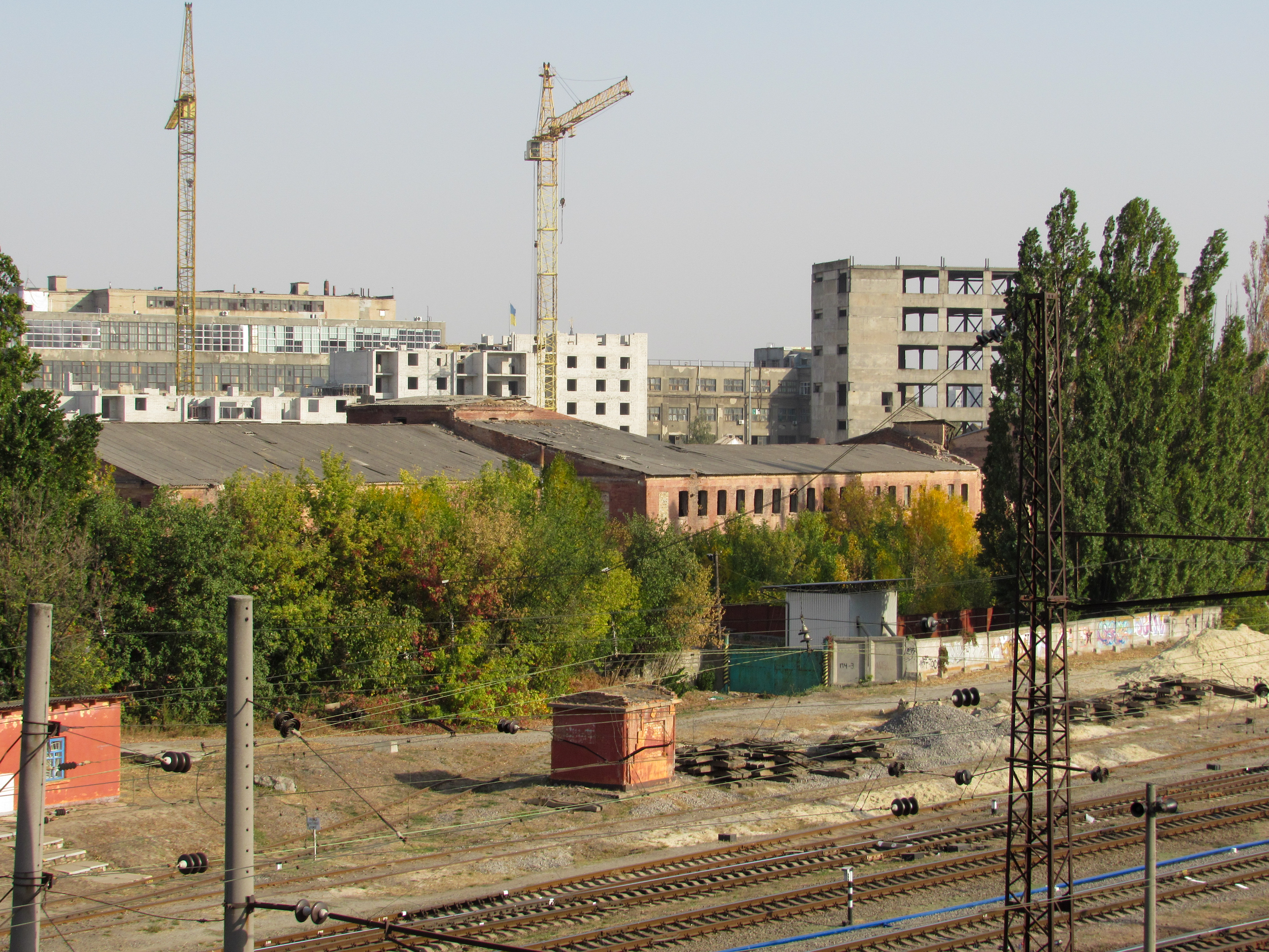
Factory buildings. Modern view from Kuzinsky Bridge

Edward Ferdinand Bergenheim was born on 29 January 1844 in the city of Åbo (Grand Duchy of Finland), the son of Archbishop Edward Bergenheim (1798–1884), who served as head of the Evangelical Lutheran Church of Finland from 1850 to 1884, and Alexandrina Bergenheim (née Bruun). He graduated from the Finnish Cadet Corps in Fredrikshamn and later from an engineering academy. In 1870, he joined the Kursk–Kharkiv–Azov Railway Society, where he was involved in its design and construction. He later worked on the Kremenchuk–Romny railway, and in 1888 his family was officially included in the register of baronial families of the House of Nobility of the Grand Duchy of Finland, listed under number 54.

While working on railway construction projects in the Kharkiv Governorate, Bergenheim became acquainted with the rich clay deposits of the Donbas region. He also observed budget estimates for construction works, noting significant costs associated with imported tiles. In 1876, he began building a factory in the Zalopan district of Kharkiv to produce terracotta and other ceramic goods. This enterprise became the first of its kind on the territory of Ukraine under Russian Imperial rule and one of the largest and earliest of its type in the empire. The factory's location was strategically chosen—close to a major railway line for convenient delivery of Donbas clay and the shipment of finished products across the country. At the time, the surrounding area had not yet been heavily developed, providing ample space for industrial expansion.

On 16 January 1891, the Society for the Production of Fireproof Bricks and Pottery of Baron E. E. Bergenheim was established with a charter capital of 500,000 rubles. From that period onward, the factory's products were typically stamped with the mark: "БЕРГЕНГЕЙМЪ • ХАРЬКОВЪ • ТБЭБ • Х" (Bergenheim • Kharkiv • BEBS • Kh). Before this, items were mainly marked with "ЗАВОДЪ БАРОНА ЭДУАРДА БЕРГЕНГЕЙМЪ ХАРЬКОВЪ" (Factory of Baron Eduard (Edward) Bergenheim Kharkiv). Other known post-1891 stamp variations include: "ТБЭБ • Х" (BEBS • Kh), "Т.Б." (BS), "BERGENHEIM" (he was among the few local producers who also used Latin script), "ТБЭБ • ХАРЬКОВЪ" (BEBS • Kharkiv), and "БЕРГЕН ТБЭБ ГЕЙМЪ" (BERGEN BEBS HEIM).

On 16 March 1893, Edward Ferdinand Bergenheim died suddenly of a stroke in Kharkiv at the age of 49. Until the very end of his life, he actively worked at his own factory, constantly seeking improvements to its operation. His remains were transported from Kharkiv to his hometown of Turku, where he was buried in the city cemetery next to his wife. His father and other family members are also buried there.

Professor H. I. Lagermark of Kharkiv University, who knew Bergenheim closely, recalled:

In his private life, E. Bergenheim was an extraordinarily simple, polite, and gentle man. Yet this did not in the least prevent him from being firm, even adamant, in matters he considered duties or questions of honor. His gentleness and sense of justice made him genuinely beloved by all the workers at the factory, while his tireless attention to business and remarkable diligence inspired general admiration...

In 1887, Carl Gustaf Emil Mannerheim, the future general, marshal, and president of Finland—often regarded as the founder of the modern Finnish state—arrived in Kharkiv. He stayed with his uncle, E. F. Bergenheim, while preparing for admission to the Nicholas Cavalry School. To that end, he needed to master the Russian language. Bergenheim arranged for a tutor, Imperial rittmaster Sukhin, who not only taught him Russian but also introduced him to the daily life of an officer in the Russian army. This chapter of Mannerheim's life is described in his memoirs. On 16 June 1903, a major fire broke out at the Bergenheim factory:

“A massive fire occurred at the Bergenheim company factory: the old factory where clay pipes were produced burned down. The new facility, which manufactured tiles, was not affected and production continues. Machinery and inventory were insured through the ‘Rossiya’ and ‘Yakor’ companies. Damages amount to 300,000 rubles.” — Русские Ведомости, Tuesday, 17 June 1903, No. 165

By 1909, the E. E. Bergenheim Company held assets estimated at 152,400 rubles. The factory was located at 3 Kuzynska Street (now 67 Velyka Panasivska Street). The company's management operated from its own income-generating building at 35 Mala Panasivska Street, likely constructed in 1912 and possibly designed by architect Viktor Valerianovych Velychko.

In the 1920s, the factory was nationalized by the Soviet authorities and renamed the "Ceramic Plant of the 8th Anniversary of October". Production of tiles, bricks, and architectural elements continued. Until the 1930s, original molds bearing Bergenheim's stamps were still used. As a result, for example, tiles with pre-revolutionary markings can be found in Soviet-era buildings such as Derzhprom and the Zaderzhpromya residential complex, although they were produced during the Soviet period.

In 1936, a new Kharkiv Tile Factory was established on the outskirts of the city at 297 Heroiv Kharkova Avenue. The former Bergenheim factory likely continued operating. In the second half of the 20th century, some parts of the facility were demolished, including its chimneys and several auxiliary buildings. New extensions were added to the remaining service buildings, and it is believed that the factory ceased operations during this time. The former revenue building of the Bergenheim Society was repurposed as a clinic for the Southern Railway's Clinical Hospital in Kharkiv.

== Present Day ==
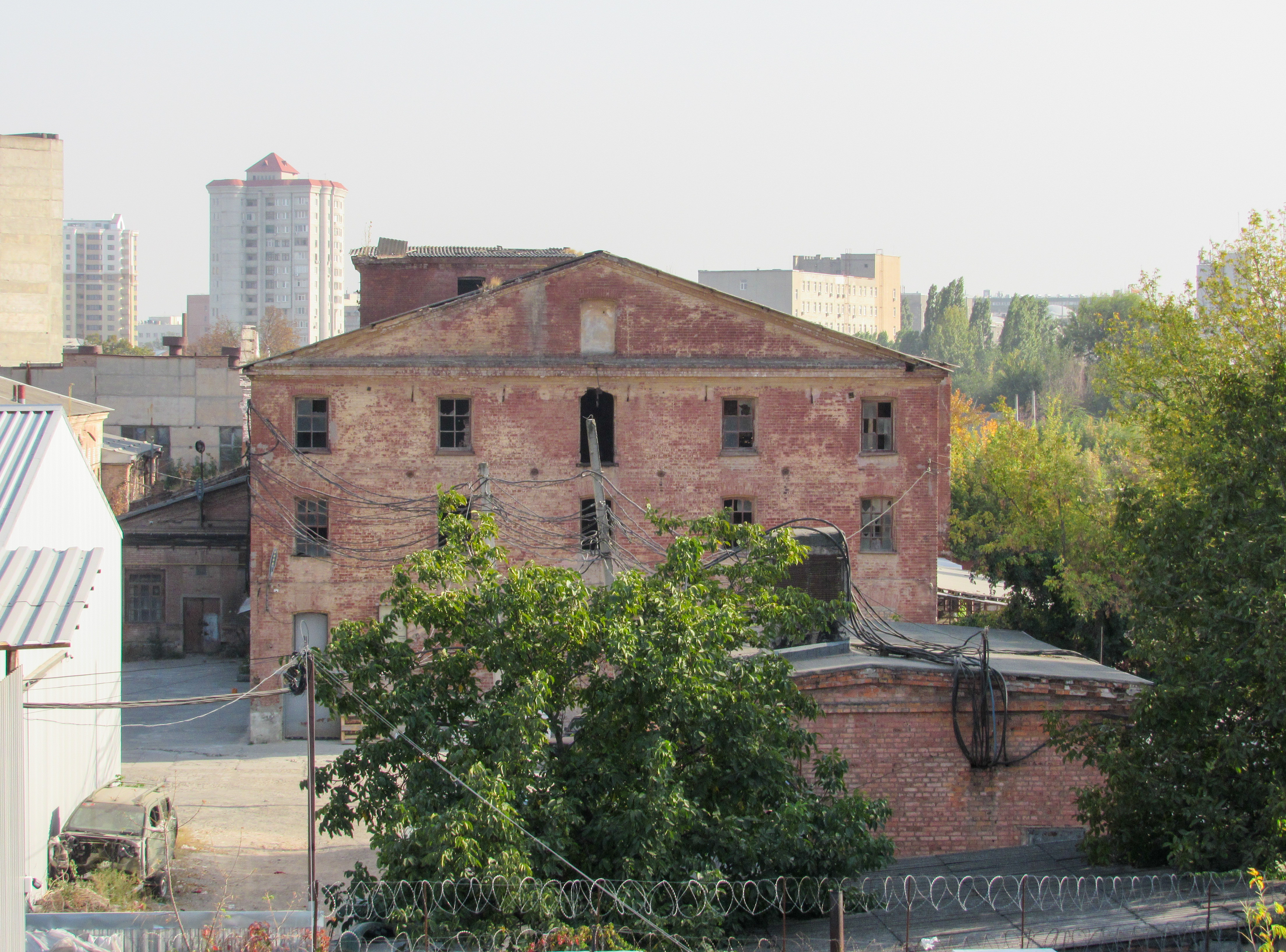
Side facade of one of the buildings. Built in 1890 to a design by E. F. Bergenheim

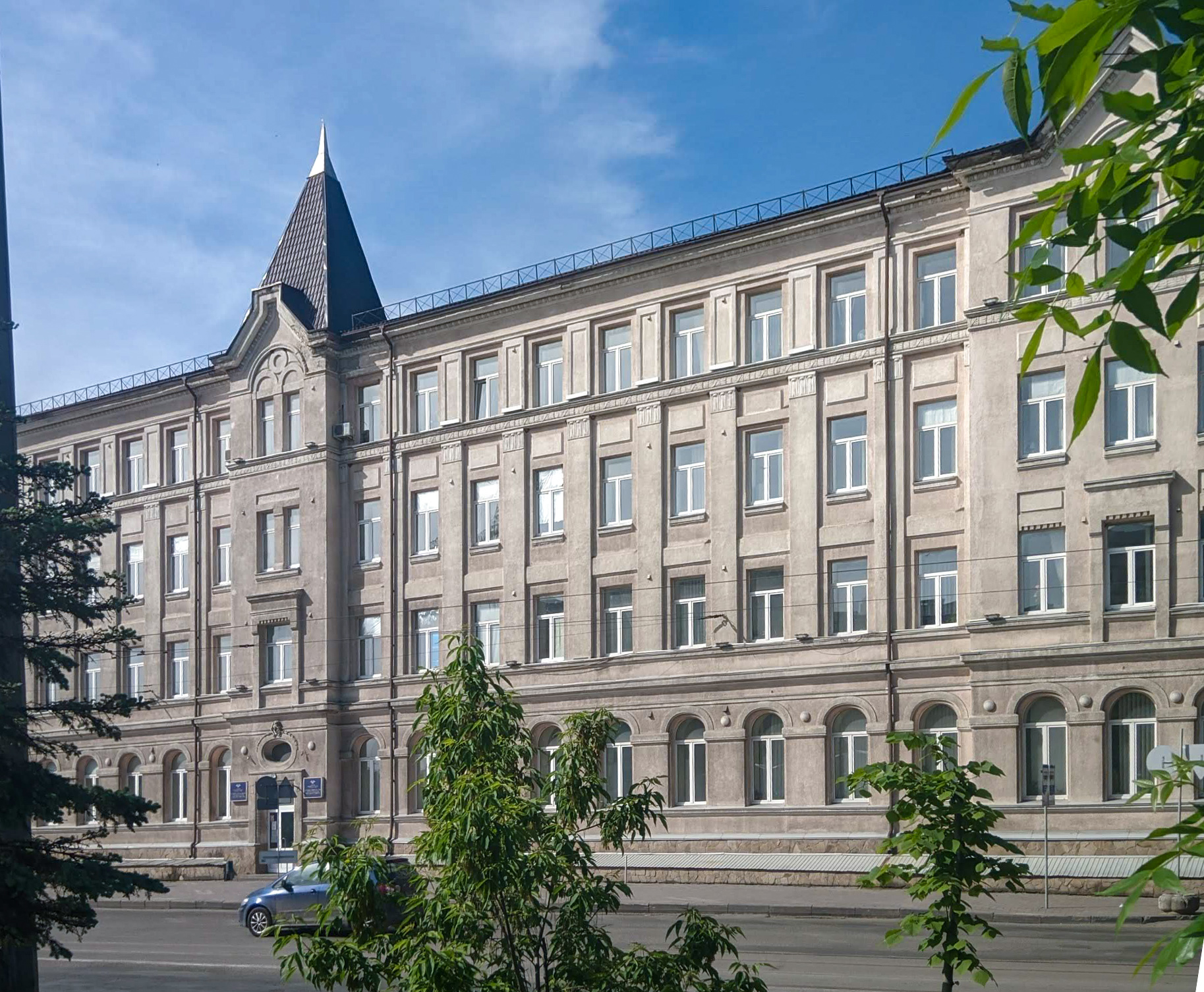
Revenue building of the Bergenheim Society

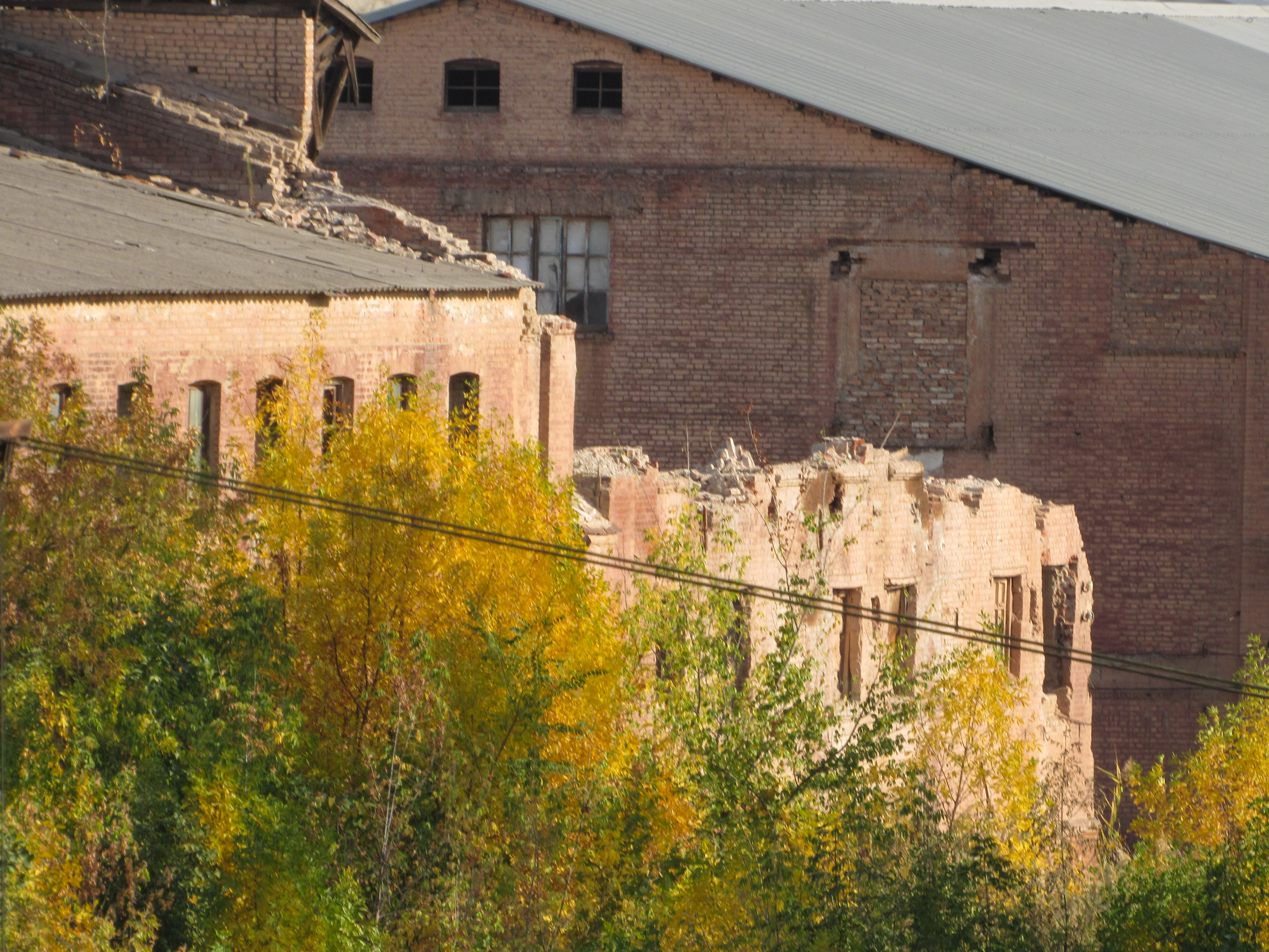
Dismantling of Baron Bergenheim's factory buildings

Portions of the factory complex have survived. Notably, the main production building constructed in 1890 to the designs of Edward Ferdinand Bergenheim remains intact. Prior to the full-scale invasion, the building was partially used as a construction materials store. It features brick-style architecture with elements of neoclassicism. The facade remains unplastered, with brick surrounds, cornices, and pediments—some of which were lost during the Soviet period. Several secondary buildings also survive and are currently used as warehouses and retail spaces.

The Society's original revenue building has also been preserved, including its ornamental wrought-iron gates. Today, it houses the Southern Railway Clinical Hospital, and is colloquially known as the "Bergenheim House," though it was built after his death. The four-story structure was built in the northern Art Nouveau style (National Romantic style), featuring detailed window frames, simple pilasters, cornices, and a female mascaron above the main entrance. Three risalits are topped with triangular pediments; the central one is crowned with a tented roof and weathercock.

In spring 2024, demolition of the main factory building—constructed in 1890 to Bergenheim's own design—began. In June 2024, following appeals from local activists, the Department of Culture and Tourism of the Kharkiv Regional Military (State) Administration initiated documentation to grant the buildings protective status. On 13 March 2025, during a meeting of the Advisory Council on Cultural Heritage Protection, the factory buildings were added to the list of newly identified immovable cultural heritage sites of Ukraine.

== Production ==
In 1887, the Bergenheim factory began producing ceramic sewer pipes. By 1892, it had expanded to manufacture acid- and fire-resistant floor and pavement tiles.

In 1893, the production of stove tiles and roofing tiles was discontinued.

In Kharkiv, Bergenheim's products were used in the construction of numerous buildings. The floors of the Annunciation Cathedral, Kazan Church (Lysa Hora), Church of the Beheading of John the Baptist, and the Holberg Church were paved with tiles from the Bergenheim factory. His products were also widely used in private residential construction across the city, as well as in the buildings of locomotive manufacturing, repair, and carriage-repair enterprises. Bergenheim's tiles and bricks gained renown throughout the Russian Empire. Notable examples of their use include: the Livadia Palace in Livadiya, the House with Chimaeras in Kyiv, the National Opera of Ukraine in Kyiv. Countless mansions, apartment buildings, governmental structures, and churches across the empire were clad in tiles marked with the stamp of "Baron Bergenheim".

One of the exhibits at the Kharkiv Historical Museum is the museum floor itself, entirely tiled with Bergenheim factory products. The museum also houses a brick from the factory and a worker's personal notebook with sketches of various tile designs. In 2003, the Museum of Ceramic Tiles and Sanitary Ware was established in Kharkiv, showcasing a substantial collection of Bergenheim factory products, including carpet-pattern floor tiles, pavement blocks, and fireproof bricks. On the facade of a building at 12 Maika Johansena Street, a tile bearing the factory's stamp is embedded beneath a heritage plaque. Bergenheim tiles and other products are also featured in regional museums in Ukraine and Russia, such as the Yakymivka Historical and Local History Museum and the Marganets City Museum of Local History.

== Gallery ==
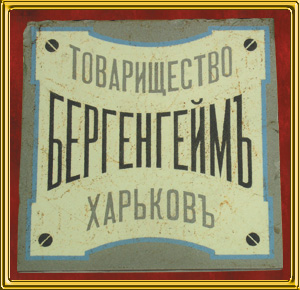
Tile bearing the emblem of the Bergenheim Society

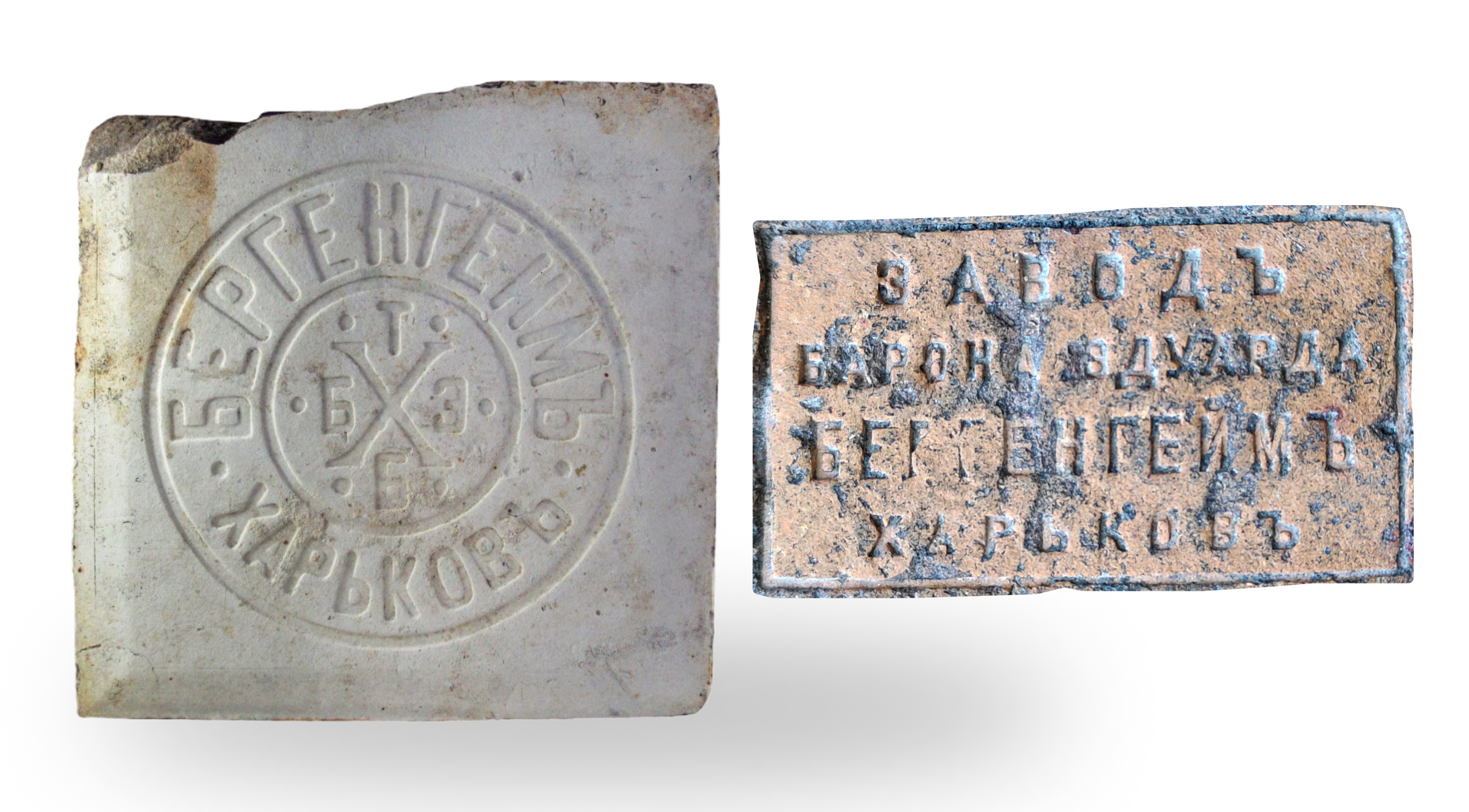
Stamps of the Bergenheim Society (left, from 1891 to 1917) and the Bergenheim factory (right, pre-1891)

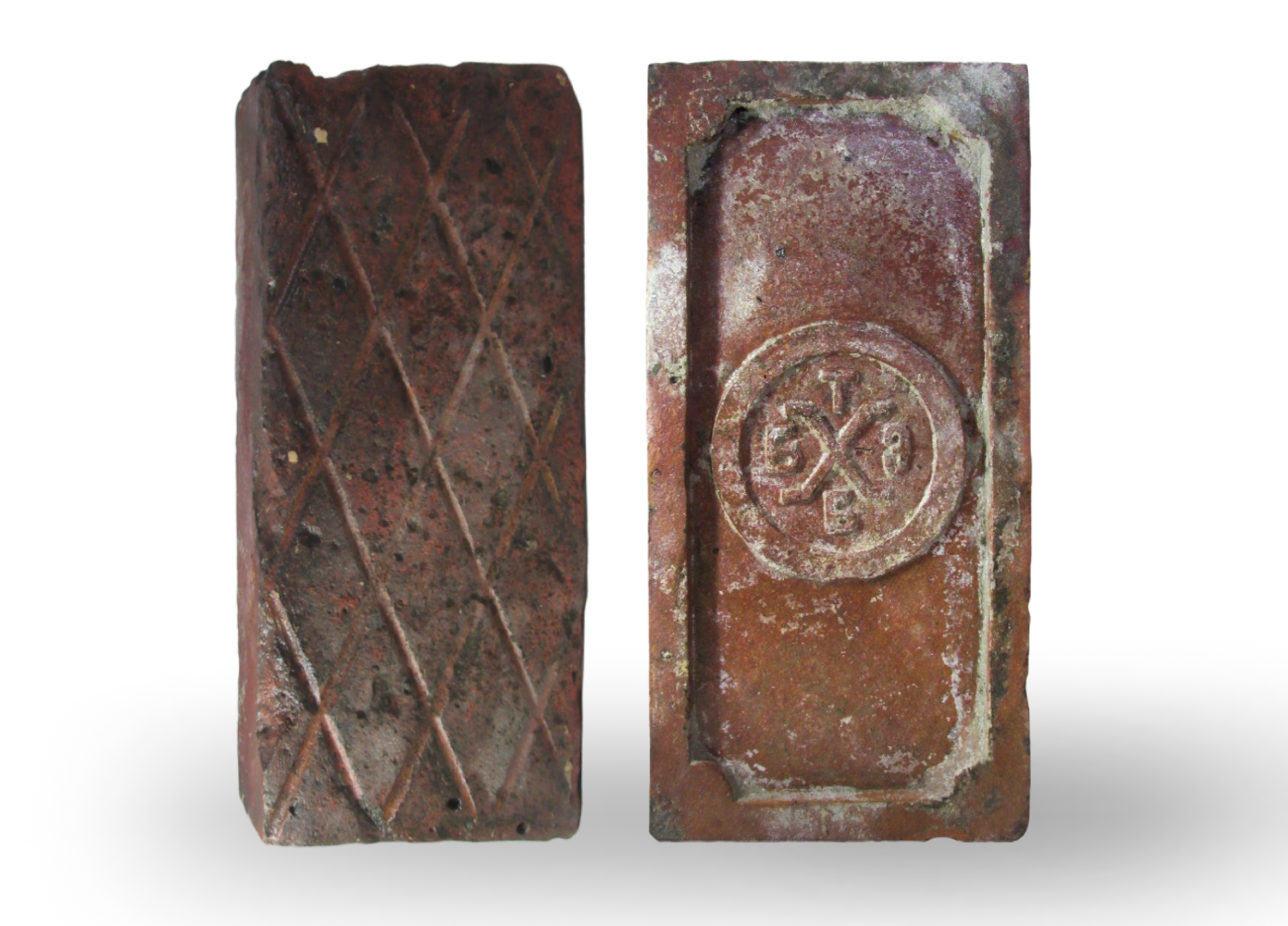
Paving brick from the factory of Baron Bergenheim (1891–1917)

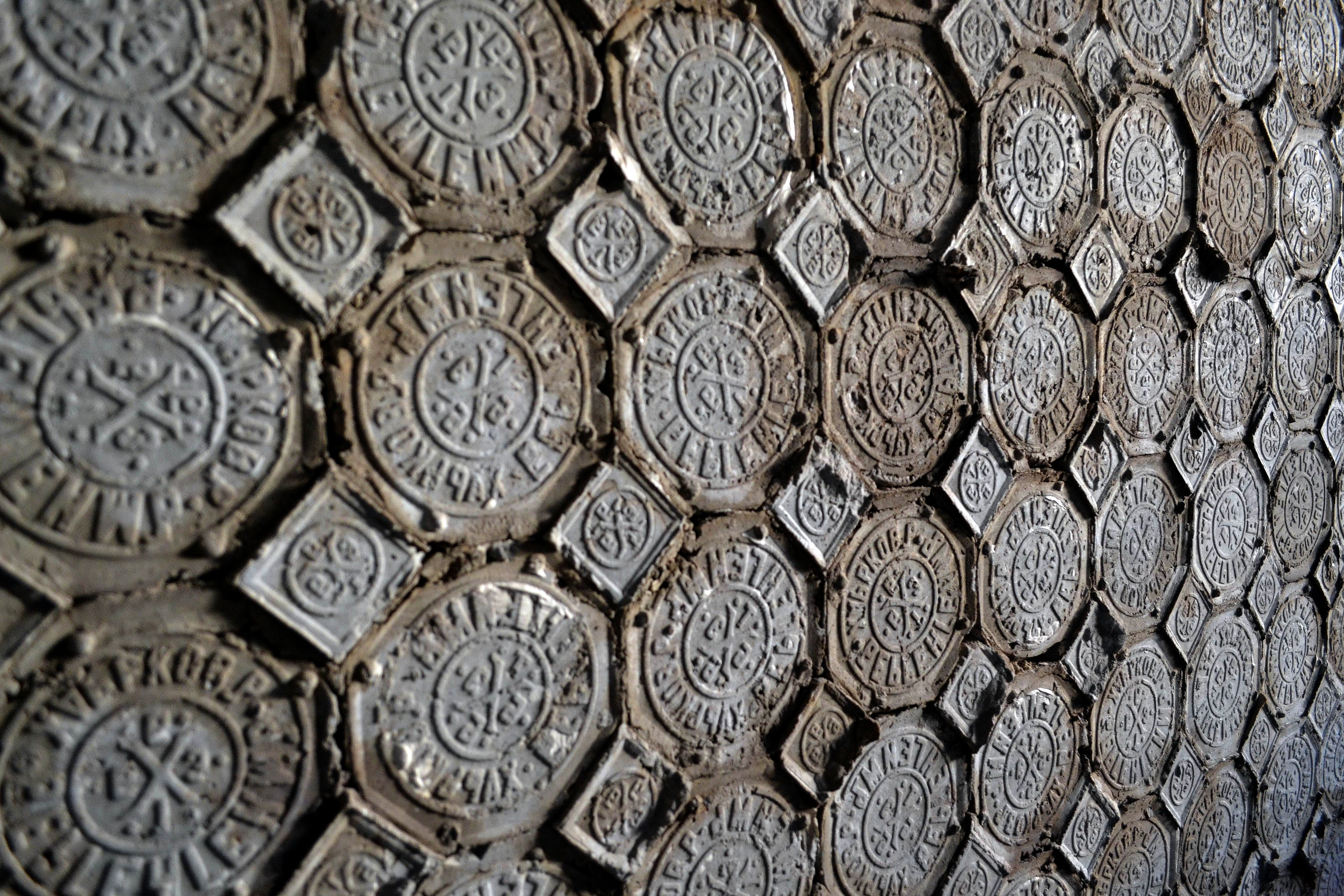
Tile impressions on the wall of the Donsoda Plant Hospital in Lysychansk

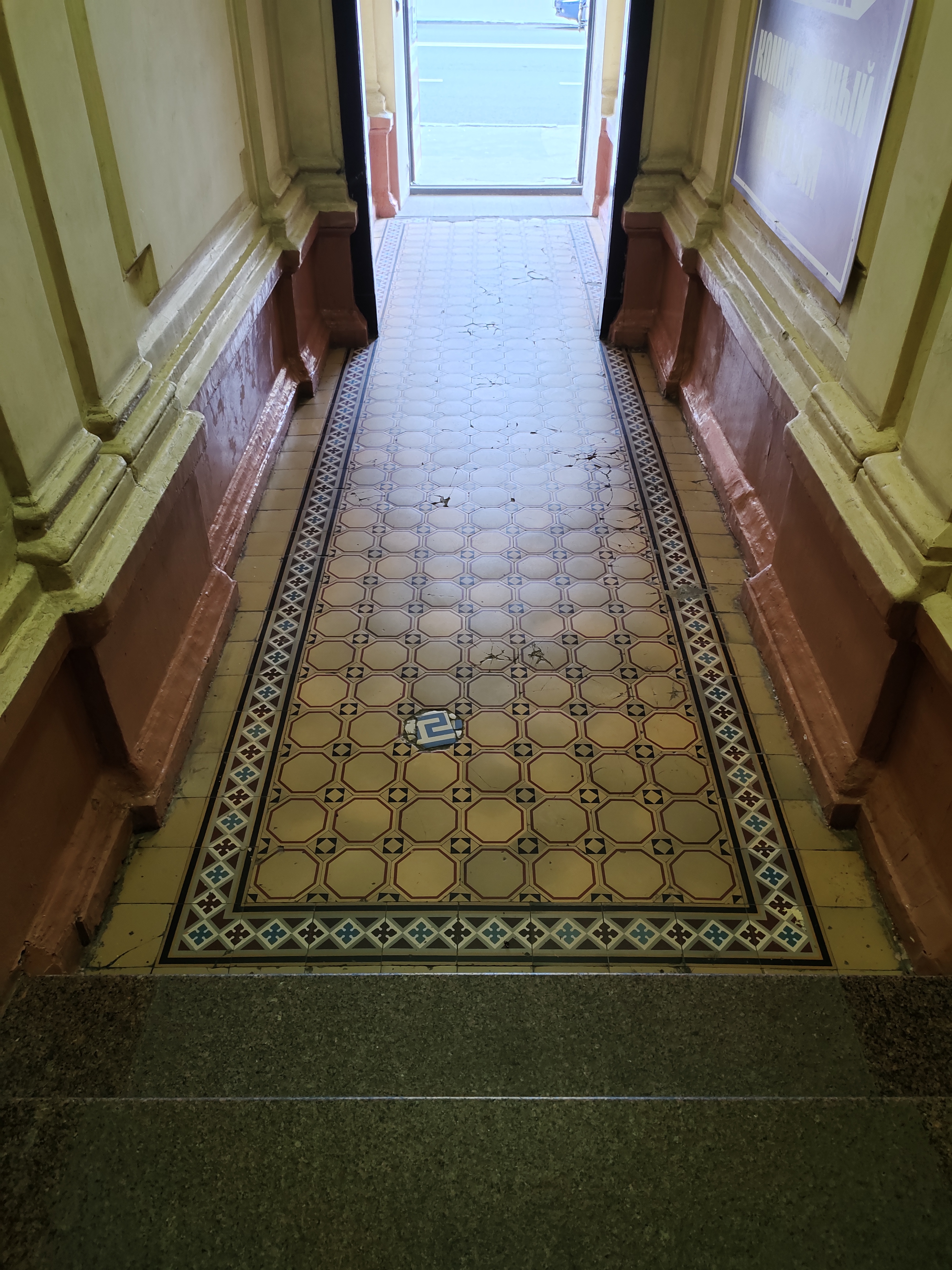
Floor of a historic building in Kharkiv laid with Bergenheim tiles

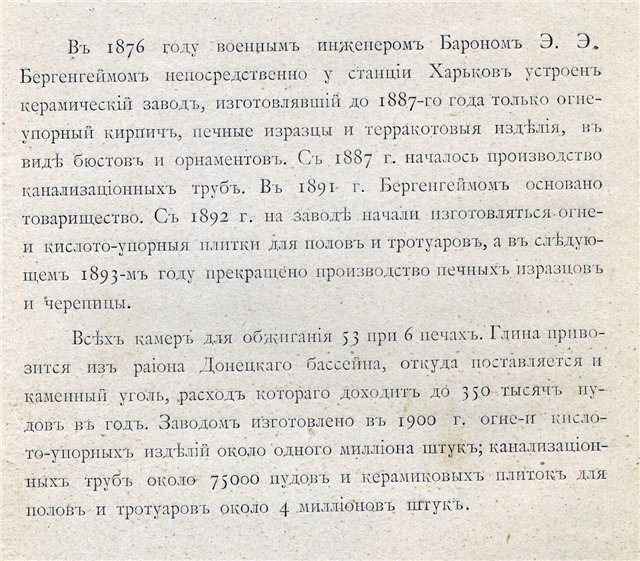
Postcard view of the Bergenheim Factory, with a description on the reverse side

== See also ==
- Edward Ferdinand Bergenheim
- Museum of Ceramic Tiles and Sanitary Ware

== Sources ==
- "Завод барона Берґенгейма". Харківська мапа. October 27, 2024.
- Paramonov, Andriy (November 20, 2020). "Прогулки по Харькову с Андреем Парамоновым. Завод Эдуарда Бергенгейма". Kharkiv Today.
- Nikolsky, Georgy (April 29, 2016). "Прославившие Харьков: Э.Э.Бергенгейм". Livejournal.
- Маннергейм К. Г. Мемуары. — Minsk : Вагриус, 1999. — 508 p. — ISBN 5-264-00049-2.
- Маннергейм К. Г. Воспоминания. — Minsk : ООО «Попурри», 2004. — 512 p. — ISBN 985-483-063-2.
- Solovyov V.O., Raenko L.V. Харьков. Энциклопедический словарь. — Kharkiv., 2014. — 1021 с.
