= Vermeiren =

Vermeiren is a Dutch toponymic surname mostly found in Belgium. It is a dialectical and contracted version of the surname Van der Meer ("from the lake"). Vermeiren is most common in the province of Antwerp, while the variant Vermeire is most abundant in East Flanders. Notable people with the surname include:

- Annie Vermeiren (born 1942), Belgian racing cyclist
- Francis Vermeiren (born 1936), Belgian PVV politician
- Goedele Vermeiren (born 1962), Belgian N-VA politician
- Jan Vermeiren (born 1949), Belgian-born South-African painter
- Didier Vermeiren (born 1951), Belgian sculptor
- Katleen Vermeiren (born 1978), Belgian racing cyclist
- Leopold Vermeiren (1914–2005), Belgian children's book author
- Paul Vermeiren (born 1963), Belgian archer
- Remi Vermeiren (born 1940), Belgian banker and businessman

Vermeir / Vermeire

- Bert Vermeir (born 1977), Belgium Paralympic equestrian
- Katrien Vermeire (born 1979), Belgian artist
- Manuel Vermeire (born 1987), Belgian printmaker
- Robert Vermeire (born 1944), Belgian cyclo-cross rider

== See also ==
- Vermeer (disambiguation)
