= Johan van der Meer =

Johan van der Meer may refer to:

- Johan van der Meer (painter, born 1628), lived and worked in Haarlem
- Johan van der Meer (painter, born 1630), lived and worked in Utrecht
- Johan van der Meer (painter, born 1632), lived and worked in Delft
- Johan van der Meer (painter, born 1656), lived and worked in Haarlem
- Johan van der Meer (conductor), Dutch choral conductor
