= Vermeer (surname) =

Vermeer is a Dutch surname. It is a common contraction of the surname Van der Meer, where van der is a tussenvoegsel (surname prefix).

"Vermeer" commonly refers to Johannes Vermeer (1632–1675) a Dutch painter. Most commonly these surnames are associated with a locality named de Meer, "by lake", but not necessarily so. In particular, in the family of Johannes Vermeer, the surname was introduced for unclear reasons.

Other notable persons with the surname include:

- Al Vermeer (1911–1980), American cartoonist
- Anne Vermeer (1916–2018), Dutch Labour Party politician and centenarian
- Arie Vermeer (1922–2013), Dutch football defender
- Hans Vermeer (1930–2010), German linguist and translation scholar
- Henk Vermeer (born 1966), Dutch politician
- Jan Vermeer van Haarlem the Elder (1628–1691), Dutch landscape painter
- Jan Vermeer van Haarlem (II) (1656–1705), Dutch landscape painter and son of the former
- Jan Vermeer van Utrecht (1628–1691), Dutch painter who travelled to Italy
- Kenneth Vermeer (born 1986), Dutch football goalkeeper
- Natasja Vermeer (born 1973), Dutch model and actress
- Sanne Vermeer (born 1998), Dutch judoka
- Vinnie Vermeer (born 1995), Dutch football midfielder

== Pen name ==
- Suzanne Vermeer was the pen name of Paul Goeken (1962–2011), Dutch writer who authored a number of best-selling thrillers (2006–2011) under this pen name. Some other authors after his death used this pen name.

== See also ==
- Vermeersch
