= Van der Meer =

Van der Meer (Dutch pronunciation: [vɑn dər ˈmeːr]) is a Dutch toponymic surname meaning "from the lake". A common contracted form is Vermeer. Abroad the name has often been concatenated to Vander Meer or Vandermeer, and VanderMeer.

It may refer to:

== Van der Meer ==
- Barend van der Meer (1659–1700), Dutch painter
- Douwe Mout van der Meer (1705–1775), Dutch VOC sailor and owner of a rhinoceros
- Erik van der Meer (born 1967), Dutch football player and coach
- Frits van der Meer (1904–1994), Dutch archeologist and theologist
- Gerrit van der Meer (born 1950), Dutch television and film producer
- Harry van der Meer (born 1973), Dutch water polo player
- Johan van der Meer (conductor) (1913–2011), Dutch choral conductor
- Johannes van der Meer, alternative name of Jan Vermeer (1632–1675), Dutch painter
- John Henry van der Meer (1920–2008), Dutch organologist and museum curator
- Jolande van der Meer (born 1964), Dutch swimmer
- Jos van der Meer (born 1947), Dutch medical scientist
- Karel van der Meer (1905–1978), Dutch football referee
- L. Bouke van der Meer (born 1945), Dutch archaeologist
- Maartje van der Meer-Offers (1891–1944), Dutch contralto singer
- Marleen de Pater-van der Meer (1950–2015), Dutch politician
- Maud van der Meer (born 1992), Dutch swimmer
- Moritz Hohenbaum van der Meer (1718–1795), Swiss historian
- Nicolaes Woutersz van der Meer (1575–1666), Dutch politician
- Patrick van der Meer (born 1971), Dutch dressage rider
- Rick van der Meer (born 1997), Dutch footballer
- Rob van der Meer (born ca. 1956), Dutch Surgeon General
- Robin van der Meer (born 1995), Dutch footballer
- Robine van der Meer (born 1971), Dutch actress
- Simon van der Meer (1925–2011), Dutch physicist
- Stientje van Veldhoven-van der Meer (born 1973), Dutch politician
- Stijn van der Meer (born 1993), Dutch baseball player
- Susie van der Meer (born 1973), German singer-songwriter
- Vonne van der Meer (born 1952), Dutch novelist and playwright

== VanderMeer, Vandermeer, Vander Meer ==
- Ann VanderMeer née Kennedy, American publisher and editor, wife of Jeff VanderMeer
- Annie VanderMeer, American video game designer
- Jeff VanderMeer (born 1968), American writer, husband of Ann VanderMeer
- Jim Vandermeer (born 1980), Canadian ice hockey player
- John Vandermeer (born 1940), American ecologist
- Johnny Vander Meer (1914–1997), American baseball player
- Nancy VanderMeer (born 1958), American politician
- Pete Vandermeer (born 1975), Canadian ice hockey player
- Tony Vandermeer (born 1962), American politician

== See also ==
- Van der Meersch
