= Roger van Hoof =

Belgian military physician (born 1947)

Roger van Hoof (born 9 January 1947, in Schriek) is a Belgian retired military physician and major general who served as Surgeon General between 1999 and 2006, as the 2nd chairman of the committee of Surgeons General of NATO nations between 1999 and 2005, and has been Secretary General of the International Committee of Military Medicine since 2011.

He was raised in Brussels and trained as a physician from 1964 until 1971 at the Royal School of Military Health Service and the Catholic University of Leuven before serving as medical officer to the 1st Belgian Infantry Brigade in Germany. After completing residency in internal medicine and cardiology at the University Clinic of Louvain, he served as a cardiologist at the Belgian Military Hospital in Cologne and the Queen Astrid Military Hospital in Brussels, where he was also head of the Department of Epidemiology and Medical Research. He then completed a research fellowship in hypertension and cardiac rehabilitation at the University of Louvain and served as a consultant there before being appointed Director of the Queen Astrid Military Hospital. He was appointed Belgian Surgeon General in 1999, Chief of Staff of the Belgian Military Health Service, senior medical adviser of the North Atlantic Alliance as chairman of the Committee of Chiefs of Military Medical Services in NATO, and served as Aide to the King of Belgium from 2001 until his retirement in 2006. He has been the Secretary General of the International Committee of Military Medicine since 2011.

He is an Honorary Member of the Academie Royale Belge de Medecine and received NATO's highest medical honour, the Dominique-Jean Larrey Award, in 2016.
