= Bubeník =

Bubeník (feminine: Bubeníková) is a Czech and Slovak surname, meaning 'drummer'. A similar surname with the same etymology is Bubeníček. Notable people with the surname include:

- Matúš Bubeník (born 1989), Slovak athlete
- Wolfgang Bubenik (born 1981), Austrian football player
- Zoltán Bubeník (born 1966), Czech surgeon general
