= View of Haarlem with Bleaching Fields =

Painting by Jacob van Ruisdael

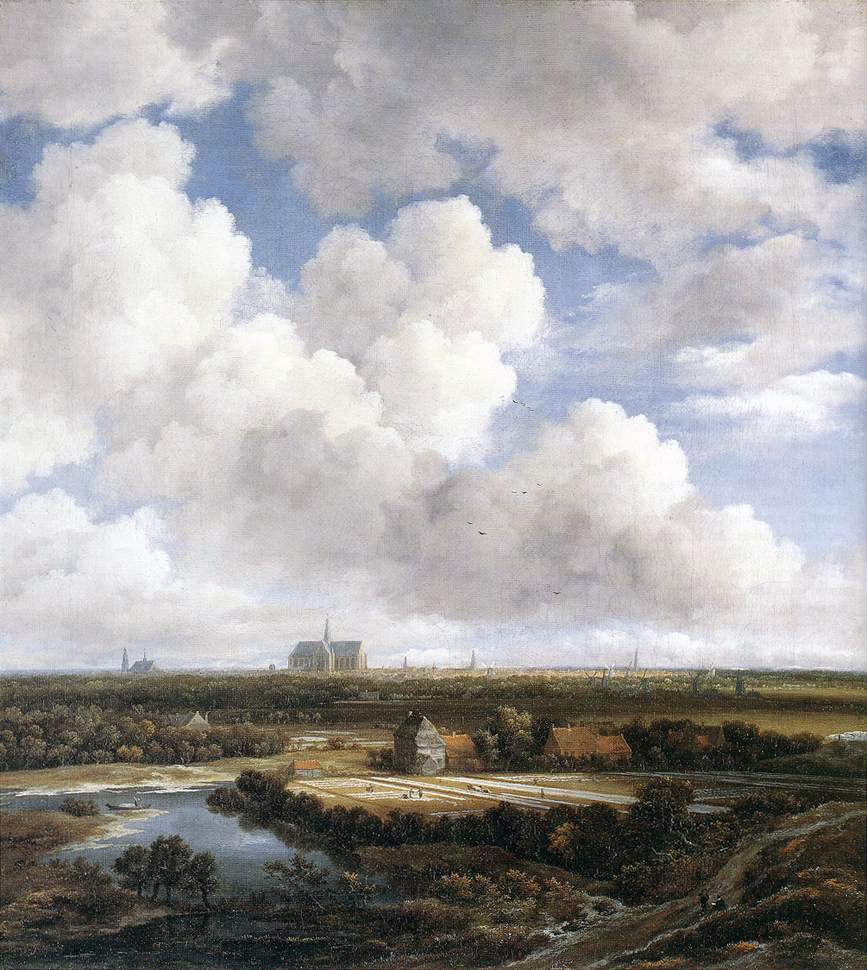
- Artist: Jacob van Ruisdael
- Year: c. 1670–1675
- Dimensions: 62.2 cm × 55.2 cm (24.5 in × 21.7 in)
- Location: Kunsthaus Zürich; Zürich

View of Haarlem with Bleaching Fields (c. 1670–1675) is an oil on canvas painting by Dutch landscape painter Jacob van Ruisdael. It is an example of Dutch Golden Age painting and Haarlempjes, a specific style of Dutch landscape painting that focuses on views of Haarlem.View of Haarlem with Bleaching Fields is now in the collection of the Kunsthaus Zürich. This painting demonstrates several critical characteristics of 17th-century Dutch landscape painting, including a low horizon line, expressions of Dutch pride of place, and disguised religious symbolism. Through this work, Ruisdael expresses his pride as not only a Dutch citizen but also a citizen of Haarlem. Painted shortly after the end of the Eighty Years' War and the independence of the Dutch Republic, View of Haarlem with Bleaching Fields, and many other Dutch Golden Age paintings, united the newly formed nation under depictions of pride in their land and the prosperity of their country. Ruisdael went on to paint many similar views of Haarlem and its bleaching fields. Even after his death, these views would continue to be painted by his followers and inspire future generations of landscape painters.

== Composition ==
On the left side of the foreground of the painting, there are two small row boats navigating across a small marsh. The right half of the foreground contains bleaching fields, cottages, and small figures hard at work in the linen bleaching process. The horizon line is relatively low, allowing the cloud-filled sky to dominate roughly two-thirds of the canvas; the base of the skyline is dotted with windmills surrounding the town of Haarlem and the Church of St. Bavo, also known as Grote Kerk. The low horizon line in View of Haarlem with Bleaching Fields is one of the key features of Dutch landscape paintings during the seventeenth century, emphasizing the heavens. The billowing clouds dominating the scene create patches of sunlight shining down on the land below; this was a carefully calculated move on Ruisdael's part. Through these patches of sunlight, Ruisdael places emphasis on the bleaching fields, a leading source of Haarlem's economic well-being at the time, and directs our eye across the canvas all the way back to the towering Church of St. Bavo. Although it has not been confirmed, some art historians believe that the owner of this linen-bleaching ground may have commissioned this painting.

== Historical context ==
Although landscape painting had been a longstanding practice prior to the seventeenth century, the sudden rise in the popularity of pleasant countryside views was likely a welcome subject after the iconoclasm of the sixteenth century, also known as Beeldenstorm, which prohibited idolatry and religious imagery from being depicted. In the seventeenth century, Haarlem was internationally well known for its linen-bleaching industry. By deliberately depicting the linen-bleaching fields on the outskirts of Haarlem within the foreground of this work, and his other Haarlempjes (meaning "little views of Haarlem"), Ruisdael immortalizes the linen-bleaching industry, the economic prosperity experienced by Haarlem at this time, and expresses his pride as a Dutch citizen and a native of Haarlem. As a result of the economic prosperity in the area at this time, citizens of Haarlem were able to purchase Haarlempjes for themselves, which created a market for more to be made and expressed their pride in being citizens of Haarlem. Although landscape paintings were popular in seventeenth-century Dutch art, the depiction of a specific industry and its connection with a particular place was relatively rare at the time. Ruisdael was the one to popularize the painting of such landscape views of Haarlem, including the industry that the town was known for. Followers of Ruisdael, including Jan Vermeer van Haarlem and Jan van Kessel, were influenced by Ruisdael's landscapes surrounding Haarlem and went on to emulate this style in their depictions of the Haarlem landscape.

=== Linen-bleaching in Haarlem ===
The success of the linen-bleaching industry in Haarlem had reached its climax at the time that Ruisdael painted this work. There were other linen-bleaching centers in the Netherlands; however, none of these locations were endowed with the perfect mixture of natural resources that Haarlem had. During the seventeenth century, linen bleached in Haarlem was highly sought after and quite expensive; this was the cause of the economic prosperity in Haarlem and the wealth of Haarlem linen merchants. All linen bleached in Haarlem received the name toiles de Hollande, or "Haarlemmer Bleek," which means Haarlem bleach. Regardless of where the linen was woven, if it was bleached in Haarlem it was called toiles de Hollande.

== Dutch pride ==
In the wake of the Eighty Years' War, a new nation was born: the Dutch Republic. Expressions of Dutch pride of place in prints and paintings were crucial in cultivating a sense of nationalism and cultural identity in this young nation. Its inhabitants were eager to depict the prosperity of their newly independent country. Art Historian H. Perry Chapman argues that landscape paintings with views of Haarlem with its bleaching fields were inspired by a series of landscape prints featuring Haarlem's bleaching fields, titled Pleasant Places Around Haarlem, done years earlier by printmaker Claes Jansz Visscher the Younger during the Twelve Years' Truce, a time during which the Northern Netherlands first tasted independence from Spain and struggled to begin to unite into what would eventually become the Dutch Republic. It is during the Truce that a sub-genre of Dutch landscape painting appears, one that exalts the rural lands of the Netherlands and the livelihoods of the people that inhabit it; Chapman asserts that these prints inspired Dutch Golden Age landscape paintings celebrating rural life. In addition to the expression of Dutch, and more specifically local Haarlem, pride through the prominent depiction of linen-bleaching fields just outside of the town, there is another much less prominently displayed expression of Dutch pride within this work: the windmills. Specifically the polder mill is responsible for much of the economic prosperity experienced in the Netherlands at this time. Much of the Netherlands is Lowlands, resulting in many marshes and pools of stagnant water, which can be seen in the lefthand corner of this work. The polder mill was used to pump water out of the Dutch landscape and create more land that could then be used for farming or even linen-bleaching. The windmills dotting the skyline of View of Haarlem with Bleaching Fields are symbols of the Dutch land reclamation effort occurring when this was painted, a popular theme in Dutch landscape paintings of the seventeenth century. Without the use of the windmill for both land reclamation and energy production, the Dutch economy would not have reached the heights it did. As a reminder of the land reclamation effort, this is also an expression of Dutch pride because the adaptation of the windmill in order to battle nature for the Lowlands was a tremendous technological feat of the Dutch, and ended up becoming their most significant contribution to the history of technology.

== Symbolism ==
There is a greater significance to Ruisdael's depiction of Haarlem beyond being merely an expression of pride in Haarlem's linen-bleaching industry. Art historian Wilfred Wiegand has proposed that there was already a precedent for using linen as a symbol to express purity. In his explanation of this theory, he uses an early 18th-century emblem of a watering can wetting linen that includes a brief biblical passage below. The passage describes the biblical story of Joseph of Arimathea wrapping the body of Jesus Christ within a linen sheet. Wiegand also uses other Biblical passages in to support this view: according to Revelation 19:8, "[...] for the marriage of the Lamb is come and his wife hath made herself ready. And to her was granted that she should be arranged in fine linen, clean and white: for the fine linen is the righteousness of saints [...]" Thusly, a popular symbolic interpretation of this work is that it expresses the purity of the soul and the purity of Haarlem as a town.

== Other versions ==
This scene is very similar to other panorama paintings Ruisdael made in this period, often referred to as "Haarlempjes" or "Haerlempjes," meaning little views of Haarlem. Ruisdael did not date any of his Haarlempjes.

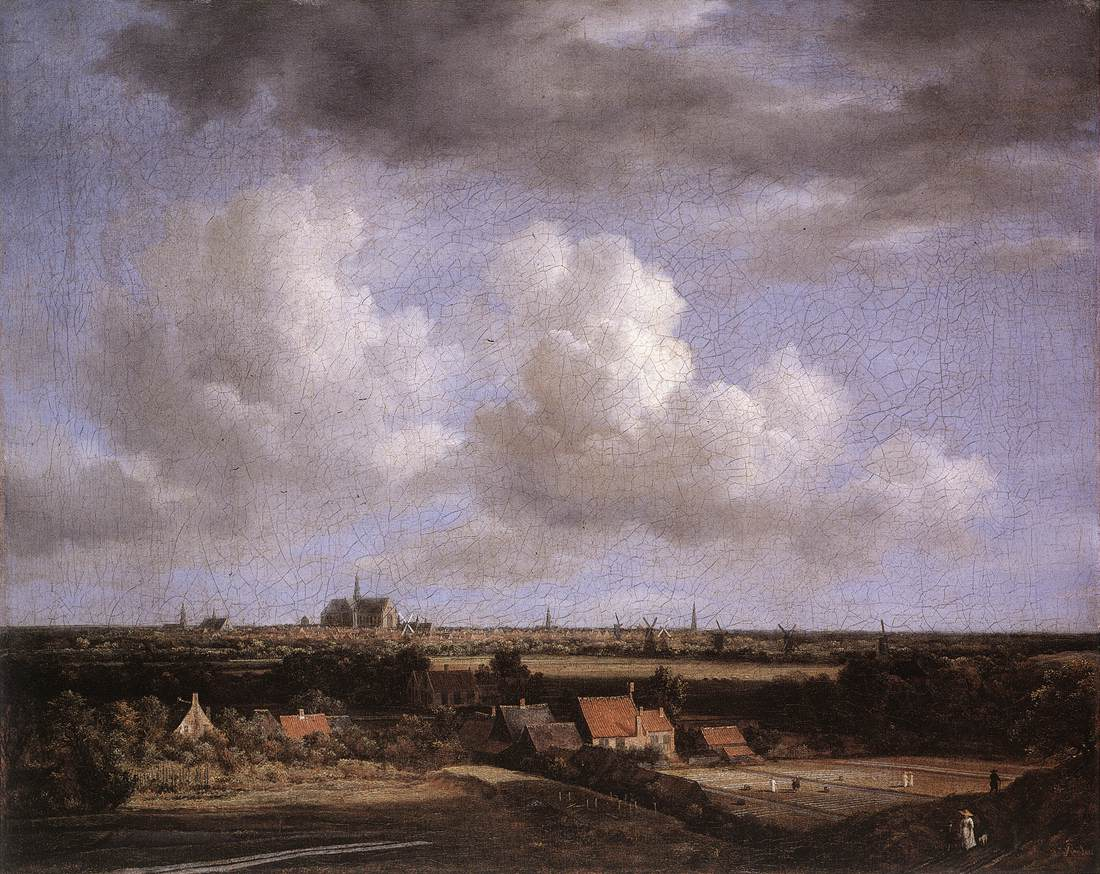
Version from the Gemäldegalerie, Berlin

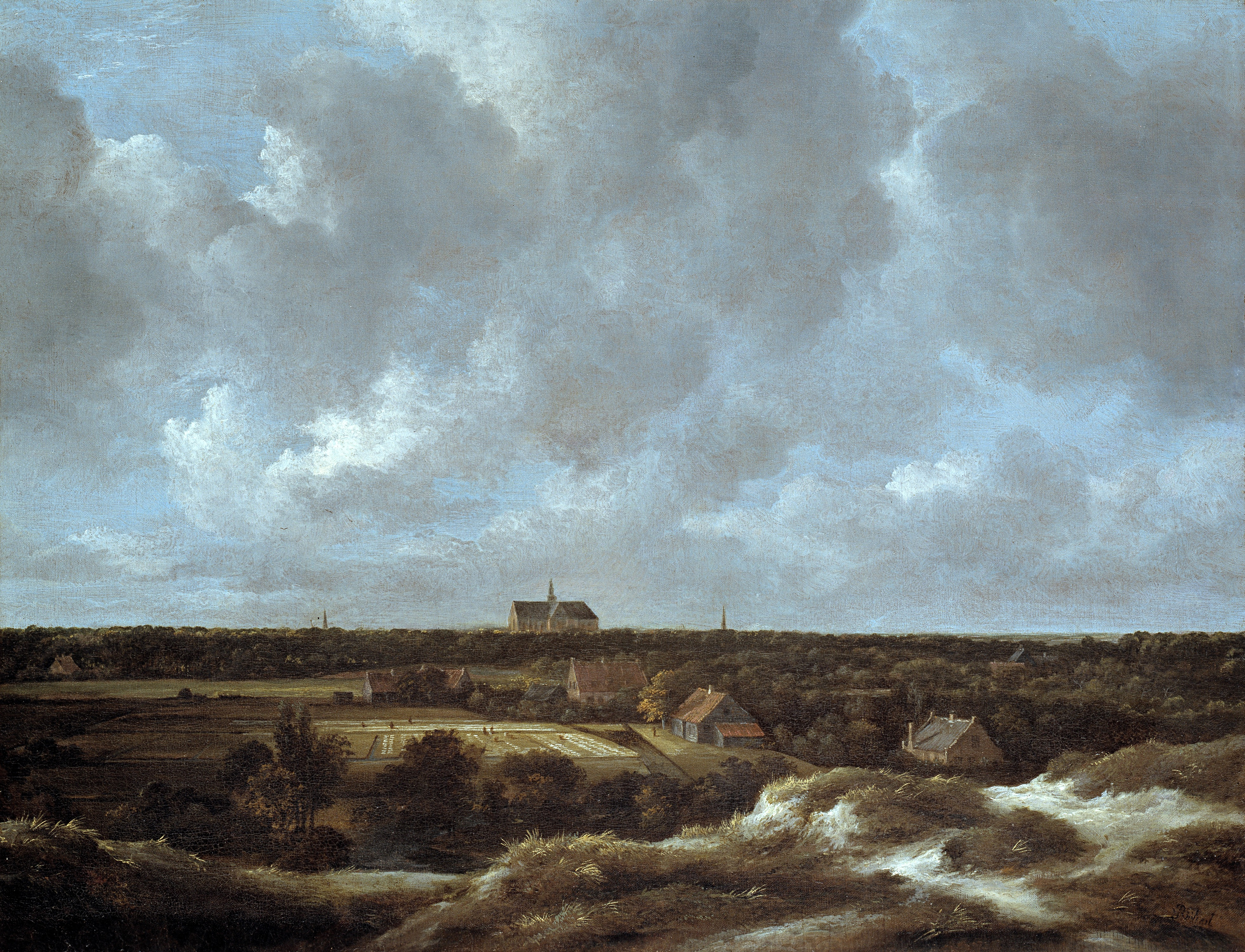
Version from the Timken Museum of Art

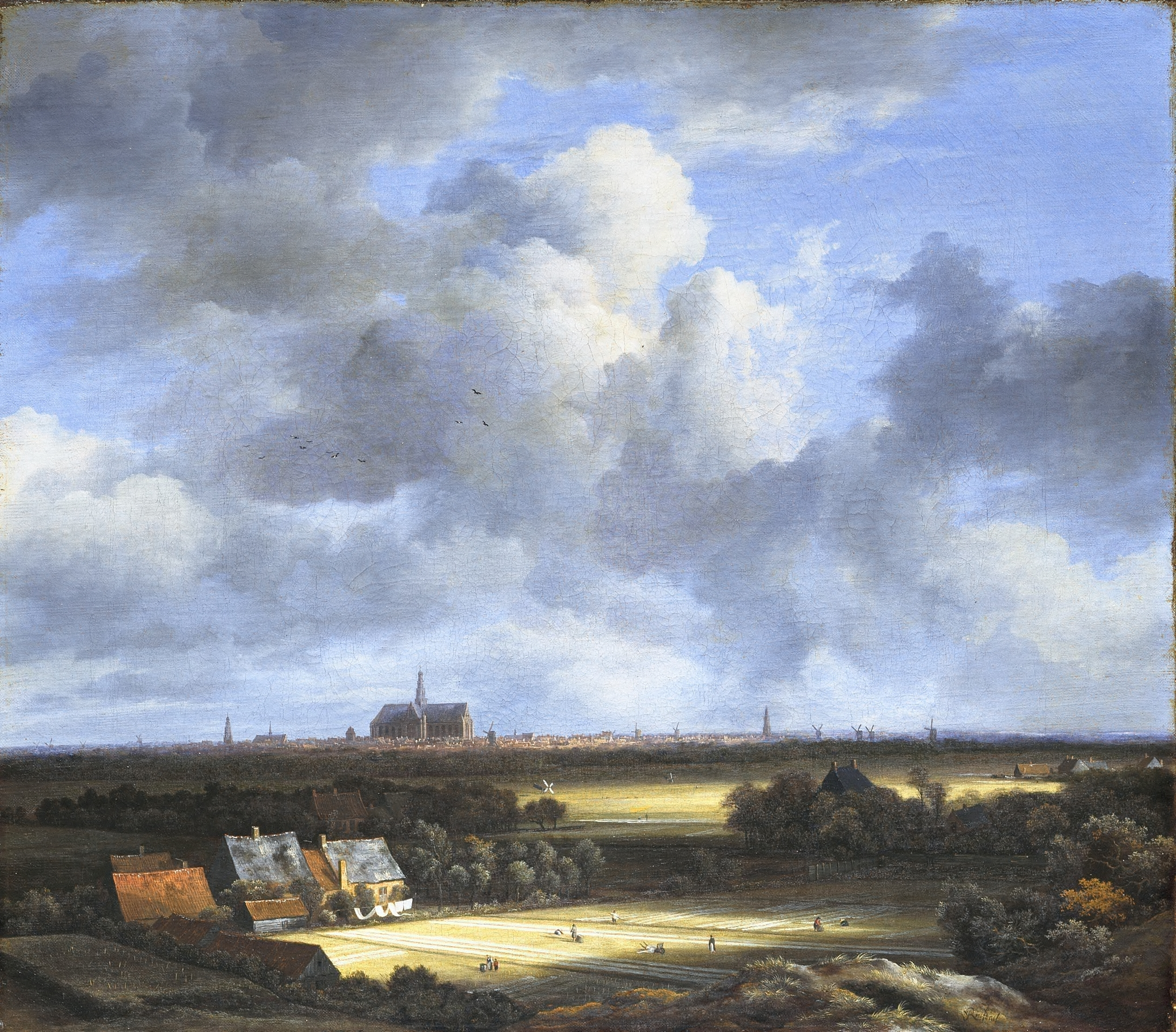
Version from the Mauritshuis

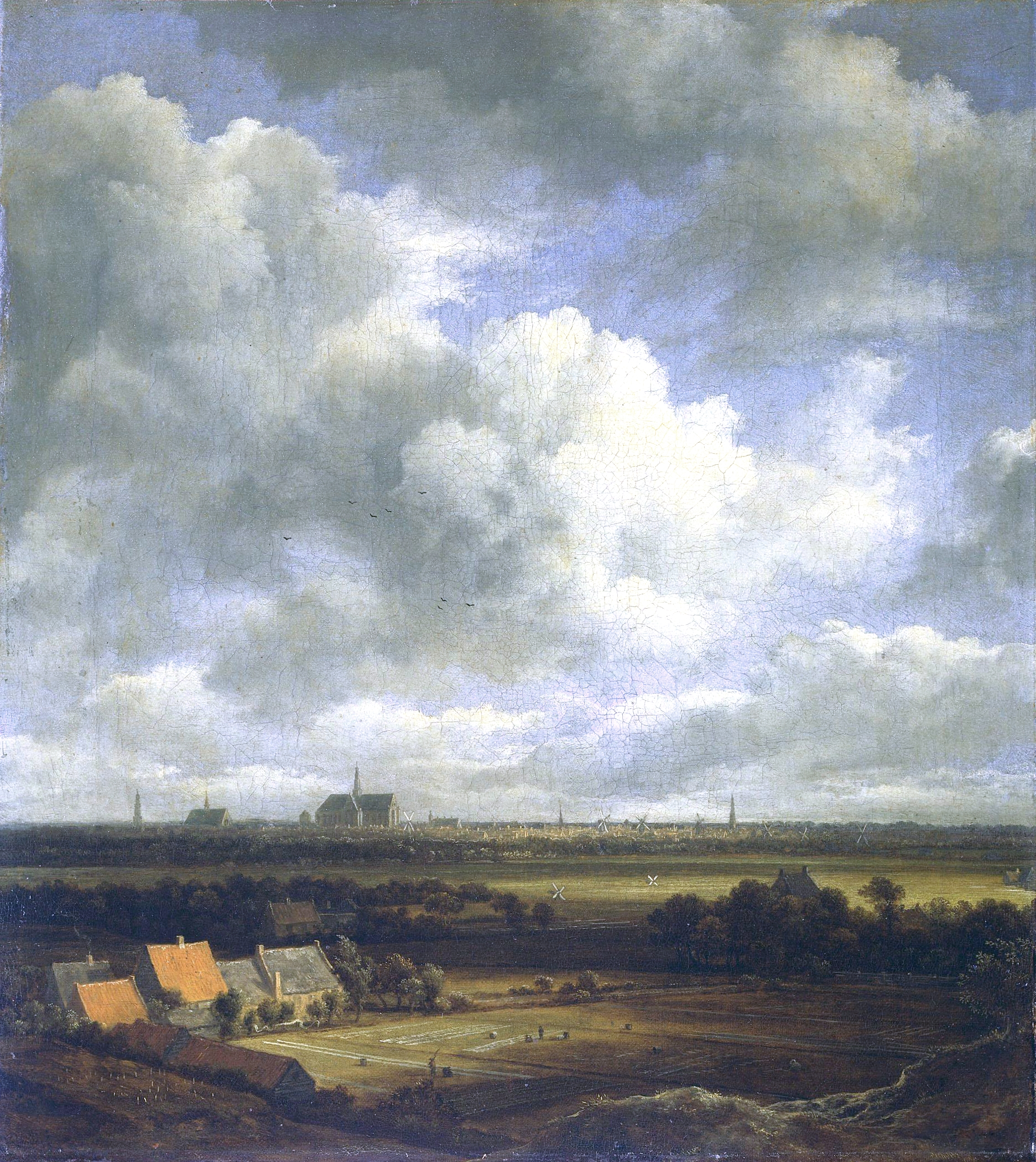
Version from the Rijksmuseum.

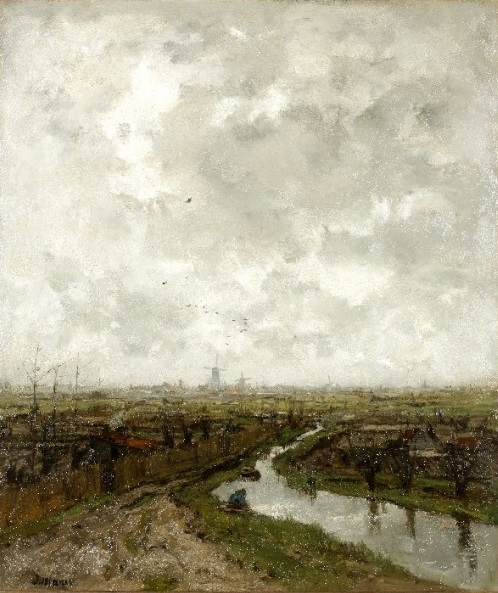
Jacob Maris: Gardens near The Hague

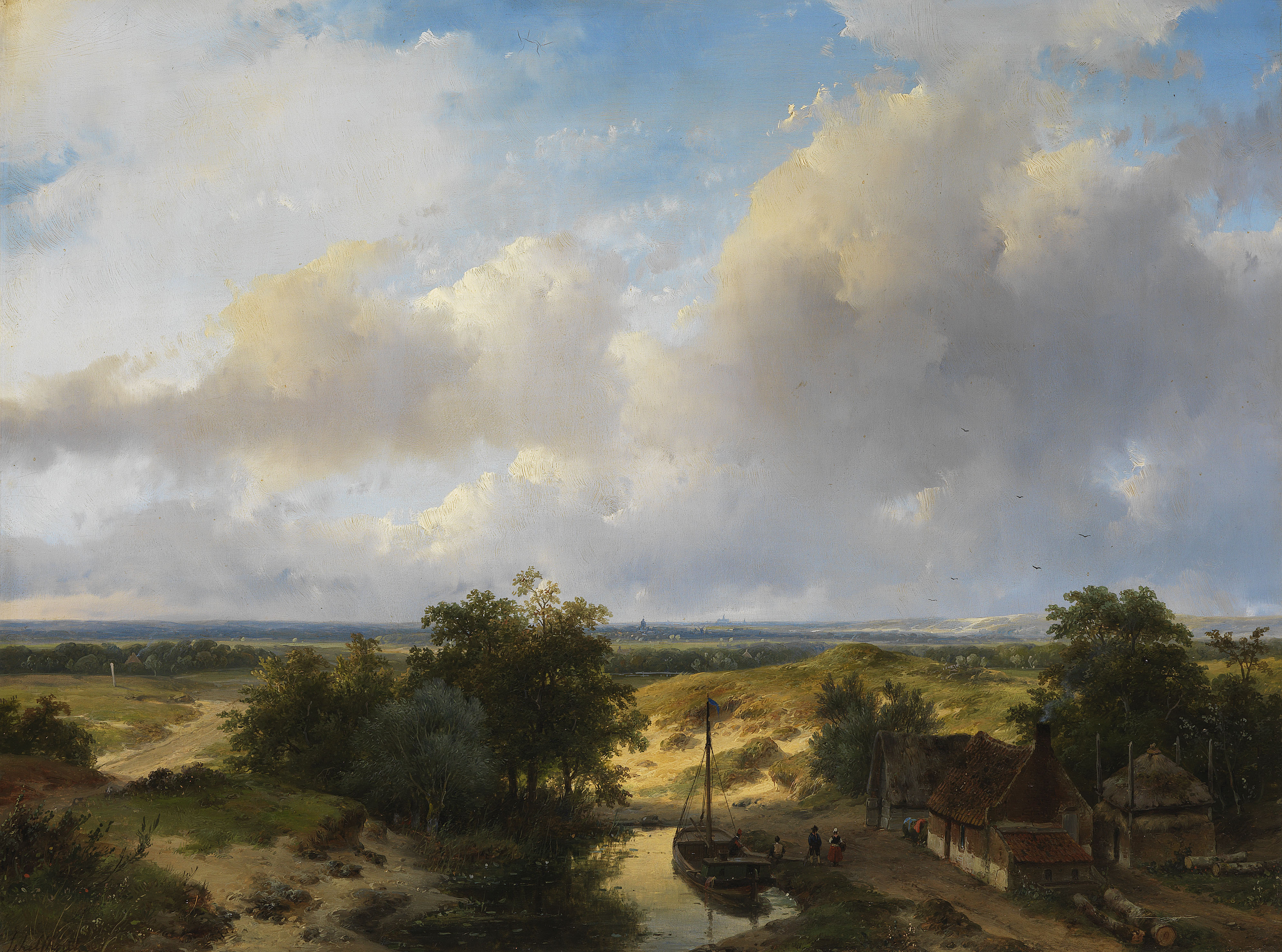
Andreas Schelfhout: "Landscape with view of Haarlem"

== Legacy ==
Followers of Ruisdael, such as Jan Vermeer van Haarlem, continued to depict panoramic views of Haarlem and even reproduced many of Ruisdael's own Haerlempjes. After moving to Amsterdam, Ruisdael continued to paint these "little views of Haarlem." These Ruisdael Haerlempjes often served as inspiration for later painters of landscape, such as Jacob Maris of the Hague School.

== In popular culture ==
In his 1995 book The Rings of Saturn, W.G. Sebald describes and discusses the painting in detail in an anecdote about his visit to the Mauritshuis.

== See also ==
- List of paintings by Jacob van Ruisdael

== Notes ==
- Dr. Beth Harris and Dr. Steven Zucker, "Jacob van Ruisdael, View of Haarlem with Bleaching Grounds," in Smarthistory, August 9, 2015, accessed March 29, 2023, https://smarthistory.org/ruisdael-view-of-haarlem/.
- Chapman, H. Perry (2000). "Propagandist Prints, Reaffirming Paintings: Art and Community during the Twelve Years' Truce". In Wheelock, Arthur K. (ed.). The Public and Private in Dutch Culture of the Golden Age. Newark: London: University of Delaware Press. pp. 43–63.
- "Jacob van Ruisdael View of Haarlem with Bleaching Grounds". www.mauritshuis.nl. Retrieved 2023-02-23.
- Kettering, Alison McNeil (2007). "Landscape with Sails: The Windmill in Netherlandish Prints". Simiolus. 33 (1/2): 67–80
- Kleiner, Fred S. "The Baroque in Northern Europe." In Gardner's Art Through The Ages Book D: Renaissance and Baroque. Cengage Learning, 746.
- Leeflang, Huigen. "Dutch Landscape: The Urban View: Haarlem and Its Environs in Literature and Art, 15th–17th Century." Nederlands Kunsthistorisch Jaarboek (NKJ) / Netherlands Yearbook for History of Art 48 (1997): 52–115.
- Stone-Ferrier, Linda. "Views of Haarlem: A Reconsideration of Ruisdael and Rembrandt." The Art Bulletin (New York, N.Y.) 67, no. 3 (1985): 417–36.
- Volume IV translated from the German original. A catalogue raisonné of the works of the most eminent Dutch painters of the seventeenth century based on the work of John Smith. Translation in English and edited by Edward G. Hawke and assisted by Kurt Freise by Hofstede de Groot, Cornelis, 1863–1930; Smith, John, dealer in pictures, London, 1912
- View of Haarlem with bleaching field in the foreground, ca. 1670–1675 in the RKD
