= Jacques-Pierre Orillard de Villemanzy =

Jacques-Pierre Orillard, comte de Villemanzy
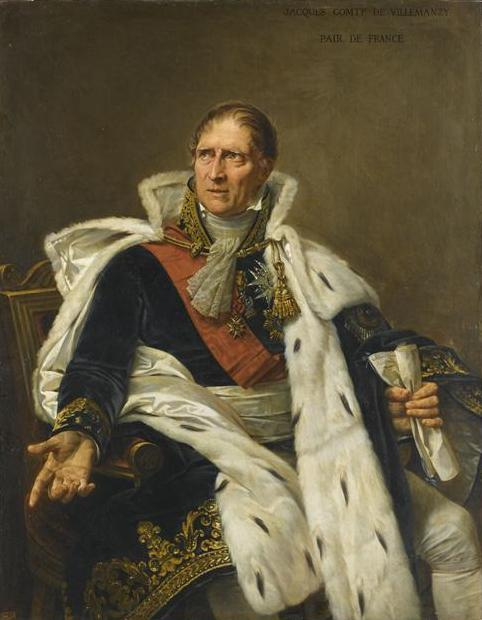
- Général Orillard de Villemanzy by Antoine-Jean Gros

Personal details
- Born: 5 January 1751 Amboise, Indre-et-Loire, France
- Died: 3 September 1830 (aged 79) Versailles, Yvelines, France
- Occupation: Soldier

Jacques-Pierre Orillard, comte de Villemanzy (French pronunciation: [ʒak pjɛʁ ɔʁijaʁ də vilmɑ̃zi]; 5 January 1751 – 3 September 1830) was a French military commissary, responsible for arranging army supplies. Before the French Revolution he served in the French expedition that supported the American Revolution. He continued to serve with the army after the revolution, although he arranged to be a prisoner of the enemy during the Reign of Terror. After being exchanged, he became chief commissary in the French Army of Italy led by Napoleon, who was impressed by his performance. He continued to serve as a senior commissary to Napoleon's armies until 1809, when he retired and was made a Senator and later a Count of the Empire. After the Bourbon Restoration of 1814 he was made a Peer of France.

== Ancien Régime (1751–89) ==
The Orillard family originated in the Amboise region. Thimothée Orillard bought the fief of Villemanzy, a hamlet east of the city of Blois, on 20 October 1728. A few years later his son, Pierre, took the name "Orillard de Villemanzy". Pierre Orillard de Villemanzy was lieutenant-general of the bailliage of Amboise.

Jacques-Pierre Orillard de Villemanzy was born on 5 January 1751 in Amboise, son of Pierre Orillard de Villemanzy. He began his military career at the age of 16 in 1768. He spent a 9-year internship as a student commissary from September 1768 to 5 September 1777, where he was taught the practice and problems of military administration. He was an able student and attracted the attention of the head of service. On graduating he was named Quartermaster - Chief Inspector (Commissaire Inspecteur en chef) to the Army of the Coast. He was posted at the Camp of Vassieux in 1778 and the Camp of Saint-Omer in 1779.

During the American Revolution Villemanzy served with the Expédition Particulière commanded by the Count of Rochambeau in America between 1780 and 1783. The French troops reached Pompton Township, New Jersey on 26 August 1781. Villemanzy was ordered to set up baker's ovens and obtain supplies for the ovens. Villemanzy was told that the bread would feed the army in its march to Philadelphia, but the enemy should be deceived into thinking the plan was to attack Staten Island. He succeeded: when he tried to collect bricks from the mouth of the Raritan he was fired upon by English guns on Staten Island. After returning to France he was stationed at the camps of Saint-Omer and Cherbourg in 1788.

== Revolution and Empire (1789–1814) ==
After being posted to Metz and Lunéville Villemanzy was sent to Paris to assist the War Committee of the Constituent Assembly until 1 October 1791. He was transferred to the Inspectorate General of Accounting, then made Ordonnateur and Grand Military Judge in Strasbourg where he sat through 1792. Villemanzy was then appointed commissaire, or quartermaster general, to the Army of the Rhine. At the Battle of Metz (1793) the army surgeon Dominique Jean Larrey successfully demonstrated the value of field ambulances. Villemanzy ordered prototypes to be built, after which ambulances would be supplied to all the Republic's armies. The politicians heard of this, and ordered a national contest to find the best design, thus delaying their delivery by over two years. At the end of 1793 Villemanzy was increasingly worried about the radical direction being taken by the French Revolution, and let the enemy take him prisoner. He thus avoided the chaos of the Reign of Terror and the Thermidorian Reaction.

Villemanzy was exchanged on 2 April 1796 and appointed Commissaire Ordonnateur en chef to the Army of Italy, where he served until September 1798. In this role he helped ensure supplies and pay for the troops of the young General Napoleon. He was then posted to the Committee of General Officers in Paris until 28 August 1799, when he was transferred to the Army of the Alps. After the coup of 18 Brumaire (9 November 1799) in which Napoleon seized power, Villemanzy was made Chief of the Accounting Office at the Ministry of War. He was appointed Inspecteur général aux revues with the rank of divisional general, and assigned to the Army of the Rhine until the end of 1801. He became a member of the Legion of Honour on 4 February 1804, an officer on 17 January 1805 and commander on 11 July 1807.

At the start of the War of the Fourth Coalition in 1806 Villemanzy was replaced as Intendant-General of the Grande Armée by Pierre-Antoine Daru. Villemanzy served as a commissary in the campaigns of 1806–09. After the Treaty of Schönbrunn (14 October 1809) ended the war with Austria, Napoleon made Villemanzy Intendant General of the Grande Armée in Germany. Villemanzy asked for leave due to his age. Napoleon named him a member of the Senate of Empire in 1810, Baron of the Empire and then Count of the Empire in 1813.

== Bourbon Restoration (1814–30) ==
After the first Bourbon Restoration of 6 April 1814, Louis XVIII named Villemanzy a Peer of France on 4 June 1814. Villemanzy supported the overthrow of Napoleon, so was unemployed during Napoleon's return of the Hundred Days (20 March – 8 July 1815). Villemanzy voted for death at the 4 December 1815 trial of Marshal Ney. On 10 January 1816 he was appointed to the Grand Administrative Council of Les Invalides, and then to the Sinking Commission on 8 May 1817. He was appointed president of the newly created Caisse des Dépôts et Consignations. In the Upper House he defended constitutional freedoms and opposed emergency laws. He was made a Grand Officer of the Legion of Honour on 22 May 1823. He died at Versailles on 3 September 1830. Orillard de Villemanzy's name is on the Arc de Triomphe among those of Napoleon's generals.

== Sources ==
- Cilleuls, Jean des (19 May 1979), L'Inspecteur Général Jacques de Villemanzy Sénateur et Pair de France (1751-1830) (PDF) (in French), Société française d'histoire de la médecine
- Gabriel, Richard A. (2013-01-31), Between Flesh and Steel: A History of Military Medicine from the Middle Ages to the War in Afghanistan, Potomac Books, Inc., ISBN 978-1-61234-420-1
- Girard, Isabelle (2006), Fonds Jacques-Pierre Orillard de Villemanzy (PDF) (in French), Tours: Archives Départementales d'Indre-et-loire, archived from the original (PDF) on 2007-10-23
- Jensen, Nathan D. (December 2014), "Intendant General Jacques-Pierre Orillard de Villemanzy", French Empire and Revolution 1789 - 1815
- Lefebvre, Georges (2011), Napoleon, Taylor & Francis, ISBN 978-1-136-80739-8
- Nagy, John A. (2016-09-20), George Washington's Secret Spy War: The Making of America's First Spymaster, St. Martin's Press, ISBN 978-1-250-09682-1
- Société archéologique de Touraine (1880), Mémoires de la Société archéologique de Touraine: Série in 80
