= Gérard Nédellec =

French medical doctor

- Born: Gérard Jean Nédellec
- Education: Collège naval, School of Army Medical Service of Bordeaux
- Military career
- Allegiance: France
- Service: French Defence Health Service
- Rank: Médecin général des armées (French Surgeon General)
- Commands: French Defence Health Service (2009-2012); Committee of Chiefs of Military Medical Services in NATO (2012-2015)
- Awards: Commander

Gérard Jean Nédellec is a French medical doctor, who served as the French Surgeon General from 2009 until 2012 and the 6th chairman of the Committee of Chiefs of Military Medical Services in NATO.

After attending the Collège naval between 1966 and 1969, he studied medicine at the School of Army Medical Service of Bordeaux (French: École du service de santé des armées de Bordeaux) until 1975 and qualified as a hematologist. His senior appointments in the French Defence Health Service (Service de santé des armées or SSA) included chief of the hematology service at the Val-de-Grâce and Percy military hospitals from 1988 until 2004, on the Hospital Staff at SSA headquarters (Direction centrale du SSA), and as Director of St. Anne's Military Training Hospital in Toulon from 2007 until 2009. He served as Surgeon General (Directeur central du SSA) from 2009 to 2012. Following his 2012 election by the allied Surgeons General as chairman of the Committee of Chiefs of Military Medical Services in NATO, he served as NATO's principal medical adviser until his retirement in 2015. He is a Commander in the French Legion of Honour.
