= Jacob Knijff =

Dutch painter

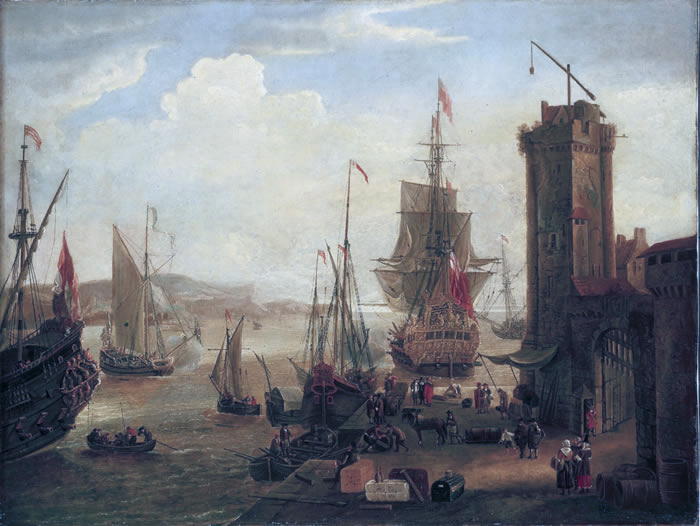
English and Dutch ships taking on stores at a port, 1673

Jacob Knijff (1 January 1639, Haarlem – 1681, London), also written Jacob Knyff, was a Dutch Golden Age painter.

== Biography ==
According to Houbraken he was the teacher of Johannes Gottlieb Glauber in Paris in 1671, where he attended the funeral of Nicolaes Berchem II on 4 January 1672. He was the son of the painter Wouter Knijff and the older brother of painter Leendert Knijff, and is known for painting landscapes and seascapes.

According to the Chiswick Pier Trust, his picture Corney House in Chisiwick from the River, painted some time between1675 and 1680, is the earliest known representation of a house with a garden in Greater London. It depicts a walled garden with a gazebo on the banks of the river Thames.
