= Wouter Knijff =

Dutch Golden Age landscape painter

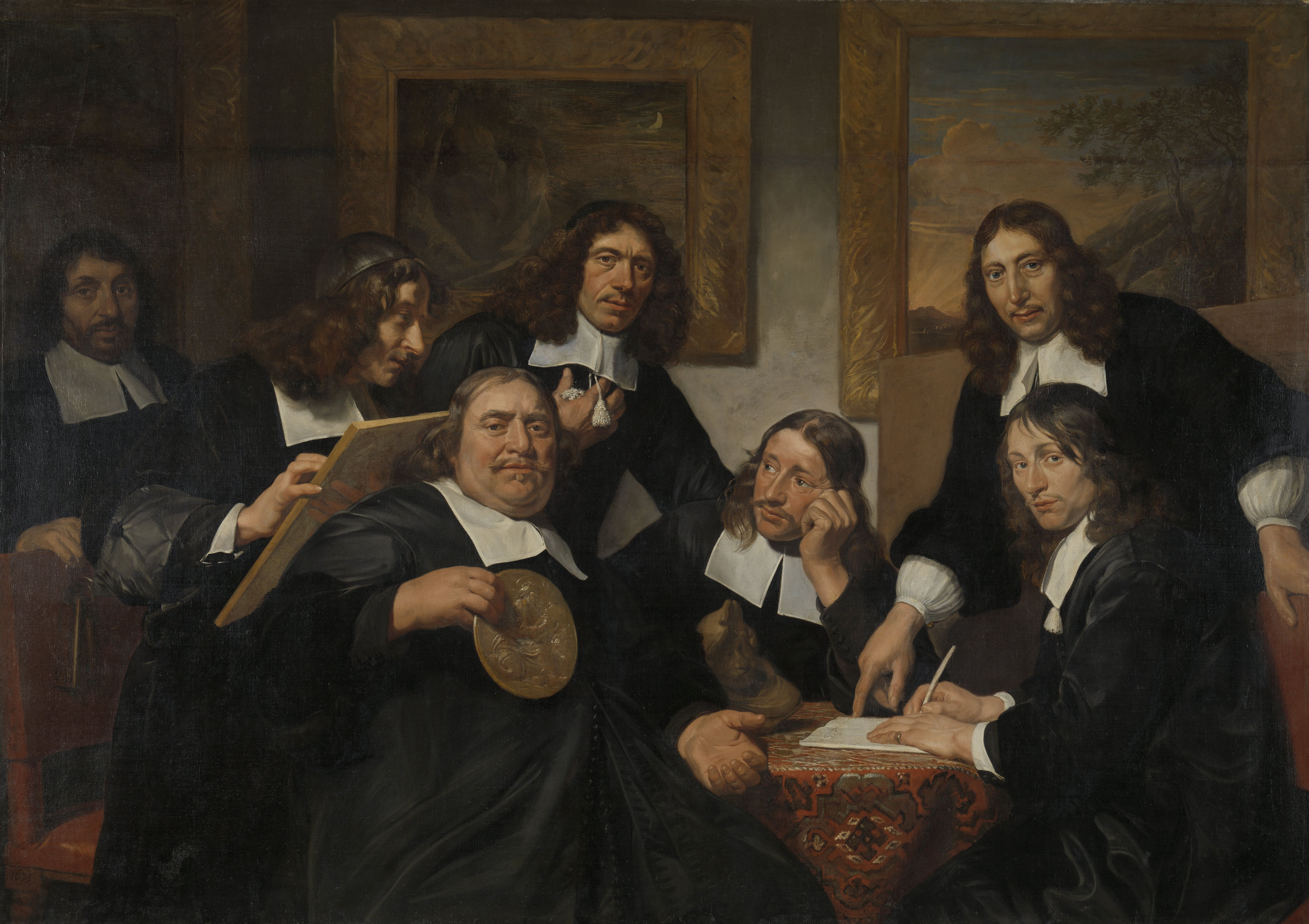
Wouter Knijff, far left, in painting of the regents of the Haarlem Guild of St. Luke, by Jan de Bray

Wouter Knijff (1605 in Wesel – 1694 in Bergen op Zoom), was a Dutch Golden Age landscape painter.

According to the RKD he was the nephew of Janneke Knijff who married Jan Vermeer van Ham, the grandparents of the Haarlem painter Jan Vermeer van Haarlem the Elder. Knijff became a member of the Haarlem Guild of St. Luke in 1640 and became the father and teacher of the painters Jacob, Willem and Leendert. He was a follower of Jan van Goyen who taught his sons and was followed by the monogrammists AVZ, PHB, TVB, and Balthasar van der Veen.
