= Jean-Robert Bernier =

Canadian military physician

- Military career
- Allegiance: Canada
- Rank: Major general
- Commands: Canadian Surgeon General; Commander of Canadian Forces Health Services Group; Chairman, Committee of Chiefs of Military Medical Services in NATO (COMEDS)
- Awards: Order of Military Merit; Order of Ontario; Canadian Forces' Decoration

Jean-Robert Bernier is a Canadian military physician who served as the 38th Canadian Surgeon General and chief medical adviser to the North Atlantic Alliance as the 7th chairman of NATO's Committee of Chiefs of Military Medical Services (COMEDS).

== Biography ==
A native of Sarnia, he was educated at Royal Roads Military College, the Royal Military College of Canada, McMaster University Medical School, the US Uniformed Services University of the Health Sciences, the Canadian Army Command and Staff College, the Canadian Forces College, and Queen's University's business school. Upon RMC graduation in 1982 with an honours BA in History, he was commissioned in Princess Patricia's Canadian Light Infantry, commanded rifle and anti-armour platoons and served as assistant and acting adjutant with the Third Battalion in Victoria, instructed at the PPCLI Battle School in Wainwright and the Infantry School in Gagetown, and served on the Operations Staff of 1 Canadian Brigade Group Headquarters in Calgary. Upon completion of his medical education in 1991, he served as Regimental Medical Officer to Third Battalion The Royal Canadian Regiment and as a hospital medical officer in Baden-Soellingen Germany, commanded MacPherson Hospital as Base Surgeon in Calgary, underwent training with US establishments in medical nuclear, biological, and chemical defence, and completed post-graduate public health and environmental health programs at the Uniformed Services University of the Health Sciences in Bethesda.

After serving with the US Defense Intelligence Agency's National Center for Medical Intelligence at Fort Detrick, he served as the Canadian Armed Forces Head of Operational Medicine, chaired the Canada-UK-US CBRN Medical Countermeasures Coordinating Committee and the Australia-Canada-UK-US Medical Intelligence Analysts Working Group, and was vice-chair of NATO's Biomedical Defence Advisory Committee. He was then sequentially appointed Head of Occupational and Environmental Health, Director Force Health Protection in charge of the military public health agency, and Director Health Services Operations responsible for support to all Canadian missions, including the multi-national combat hospital in Kandahar for which Canada received NATO's highest medical honour, and for chairing the multi-national steering group coordinating NATO health resources in southern Afghanistan. During his term as Deputy Surgeon General, he also chaired the Health, Medicine, and Protection research committee of NATO's Science and Technology Organization, the world's largest research network.

In 2012, he was appointed Surgeon General, Head of the Royal Canadian Medical Service, Commander of Canadian Forces Health Services Group, Director General Health Services and Honorary Physician to Queen Elizabeth II. In 2015, he was unanimously elected Chairman of the NATO Committee of the Chiefs of Military Medical Services, serving until 2018.

=== Civilian Appointments ===
- Governing council and executive committee of the Canadian Institutes of Health Research
- Board of directors, chair of Governance and Quality Committees for Ontario Health
- Council of the Royal College of Physicians and Surgeons of Canada
- Advisory council of the Canadian Institute for Military and Veterans Health Research
- Board of the Foundation for Civic Literacy
- Board of The Dorchester Review
- Board of Royal Ottawa Institute for Mental Health Research
- Adjunct professor of the Uniformed Services University of the Health Sciences

== Awards ==
- Royal Military College History Prize
- United States Army Medical Department Center and School Commanding General's Award
- Honorary Doctor of Science degree from Queen's University
- Order of Military Merit
- Order of Ontario
- Honorary Fellowship from the Royal College of Physicians and Surgeons
- Election to the U.S. national honour society in Public Health
- Honorary membership in the Royal Canadian Dental Corps
- NATO Science and Technology Organization Award of Excellence.
- Chief of Defence Staff Commendation
- Knight of the Sovereign Military Order of Malta
- Honorary Physician to Her Majesty the Queen
- Honorary Graduate of the U.S. Interagency Institute for Federal Healthcare Executives
- First graduate of the Uniformed Services University to be appointed a Surgeon General

- Recognized in the United States Congress
- Presented a Jefferson Cup by the U.S. Joint Chiefs of Staff

== Medals and Awards ==

Ribbon	Description	Notes
	Order of Military Merit (OMM)	
	Order of Ontario (OOnt)	
	Special Service Medal	
	Queen Elizabeth II Diamond Jubilee Medal	
	Canadian Forces' Decoration (CD)	32 years of service in the Canadian Forces
	Knight of the Order of Malta	
