= Leonard Knijff =

Dutch painter

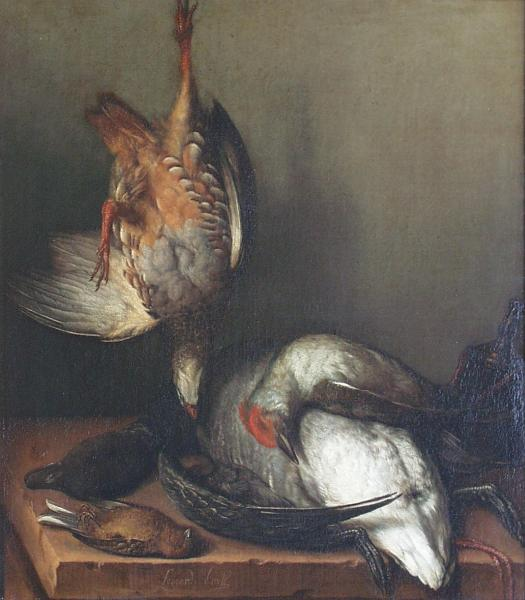
Poultry

Leonard Knyff or Leendert Knijff (10 August 1650, Haarlem - April 1722, London) was a Dutch draughtsman and painter. He was the son of landscape painter Wouter Knijff and the brother of Jacob Knijff and left around 1681 from Holland to England. Knyff collaborated with Kip to produce views of country houses and gardens for Britannia Illustrata and Le Nouveau Théâtre.

The topographical images of Kip and Knyff are significant for providing reliable illustrations of the development of the formal English garden in the Dutch-French style. Their documentary information for this period in British architecture and landscape design is particularly valued because, within a generation, the formal gardens seen in these views would be swept away in favor of the pastoral compositions, derived from idealized landscapes of painters such as Claude Lorrain, that characterize the "naturalistic" English landscape gardens.

In the later 20th century many of the Kip and Knyff views were hand-coloured, as monochrome landscapes proved increasingly harder to sell in the market.

== Biography ==
He was born in Haarlem as the son of the painter Wouter Knijff, where he received his training as an artist. He moved to London around 1681 and though he returned to the Netherlands on trips, he stayed in London until he died. He is known for paintings, drawings, and art auctions. He collaborated with Jan Kip on a series of engravings of English country houses.

His brother Jacob Knijff was a marine painter.

== Link to Jan Kip ==
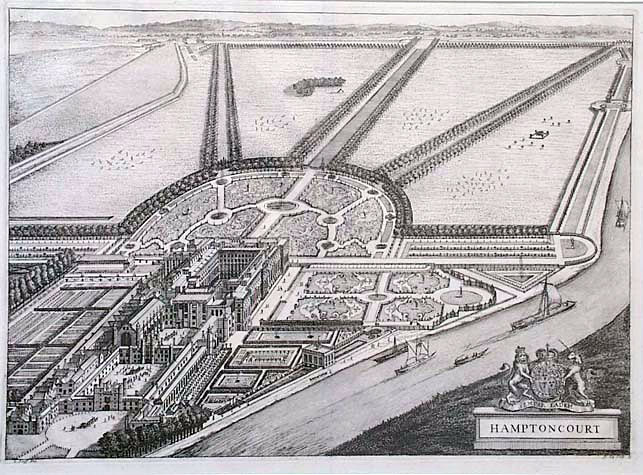
Hampton Court Palace, on the north bank of the River Thames in west London, from Kip and Knyff's Britannia illustrata, 1708

The inexorably linked careers of Leonard Knijff and Jan Kip trace a specialty of engraved views of English country houses, represented in minute detail from the bird's-eye view that was a long-established pictorial convention for topography. Their major work was Britannia Illustrata: Or Views of Several of the Queens Palaces, as Also of the Principal seats of the Nobility and Gentry of Great Britain, Curiously Engraven on 80 Copper Plates, London (1707, published in the winter of 1708 – 09). The volume is among the most important English topographical publications of the 18th century. Architecture is rendered with great care and detail, and the settings of parterres and radiating avenues driven through woods or planted across fields, garden paths gates and toolsheds are illustrated with meticulous detail, and amusingly staffed with figures and horses, coaches pulling into forecourts, water-craft on rivers, filled with the delight native to the Low Countries' traditions. Some of the plates are maps, in the Siennese "map perspective," a feat of imagination in a world that had not conceived even of a balloon ascension.
