= Bubeníček =

Bubeníček (feminine: Bubeníčková) is a Czech surname, meaning 'little drummer'. A similar surname with the same etymology is Bubeník. Notable people with the surname include:

- Michelle Bubenicek (born 1971), French historian
- Ota Bubeníček (1871–1962), Czech painter
- Simona Bubeníčková (born 2008), Czech Paralympic Nordic skier
