= Vermeer (disambiguation) =

Johannes Vermeer (1632–1675) was a Dutch painter.

Vermeer may also refer to:

- Vermeer (surname)
- 4928 Vermeer, a main belt asteroid
- AMD Vermeer, the codename for the desktop line of AMD's Zen 3 CPUs
- Restaurant Vermeer, a restaurant in the Netherlands
- Vermeer Centre, an information center dedicated to the painter Johannes Vermeer
- Vermeer Company, manufacturer of agricultural machines founded by Gary Vermeer
- Vermeer Dutch Chocolate Cream Liqueur
- Vermeer Quartet, a string quartet
- Vermeer Technologies, software company from 1994 to 1996
- Vermeer's Window, a 1978 science fiction story by Gordon Eklund
- Vermeer (video game series), a series of strategy and business simulation video games
