= De Meer =

De Meer may refer to:

- De Meer Stadion, Amsterdam, the Netherlands
- De Meer d'Osen, Dutch noble family
- Rocío de Meer (born 1989), Spanish lawyer and politician
- Torre de Meer fort in Cardona, Spain, a protected monument

== See also ==
- Van der Meer
- Meer
