= Marie-Élisabeth Laville-Leroux =

French artist (1770–1826)

- Born: 27 March 1770
- Died: 23 July 1842 (aged 72); Bièvres, France
- Known for: Painting
- Spouse: Dominique Larrey (m. 1794)

Marie-Élisabeth Laville-Leroux (27 March 1770 (Note: The date 1770 is given by Astrid Reuter, page 109.) – 23 July 1842) was a French painter. Like her sister, Marie-Guillemine Benoist, she studied (in 1787) under David.

Her mother, Marguerite-Marie Lombard, was from Toulouse and her father, René Laville-Leroux was from Brittany. She sometimes exhibited with her sister Marie-Guillemine, and with Henriette, born in 1772. as in the exhibition at la place Dauphine in 1786 where she displayed Dame en satin blanc, garnie de marte; and in 1788, Artémise serre sur son cœur l'urne contenant les cendres de Mausole; and in 1789, Une Vestale infidèle. In 1791, she exhibited Artémise in the Salon de l'Académie.

In 1794 she married Dominique Larrey.
