= Balthasar van der Veen =

Dutch painter

- Born: 1596; Amsterdam
- Died: 1660 (aged 63–64); Haarlem

Balthasar (Baltazar) van der Veen (1596 – 1660) was a Dutch Golden Age landscape painter He was a son of Balthasar van der Veen, a merchant from Antwerp Balthasar, the painter, is mentioned in Jan van der Veen's poem as his nephew. The poem was written for his wedding with Grietje Schaaps, page 319. In this book written by M. E. Houck about some of the well known families from Deventer, Houck writes about a brother of Jan van der Veen, Walewijn van der Veen, page 314 We therefor can assume, correctly that these people were indeed related.

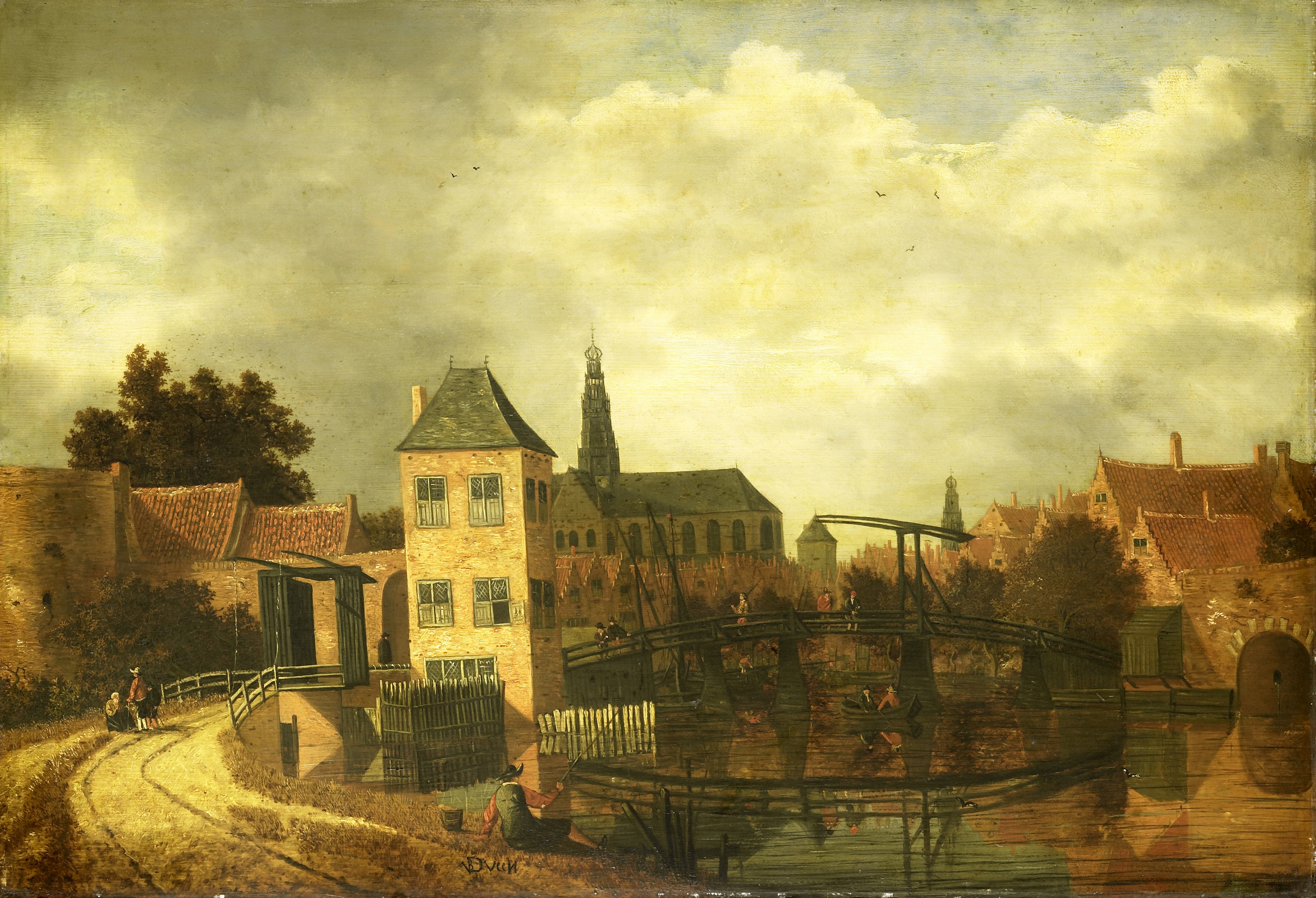
View of Haarlem near the Eendjespoort (southern gate over the Spaarne)

Van der Veen was born in Amsterdam where he was registered in 1620. He worked in Gorinchem during the years 1637 - 1639 and then travelled south to France and further to Italy, but was back in Amsterdam by 1657 when he became a member of the Guild of St. Luke there. He is known for landscapes after Cornelis Gerritsz Decker, Wouter Knijff, and Roelof Jansz van Vries. Van der Veen probably died in Haarlem.
