= Committee of Chiefs of Military Medical Services in NATO =

Senior medical body of NATO

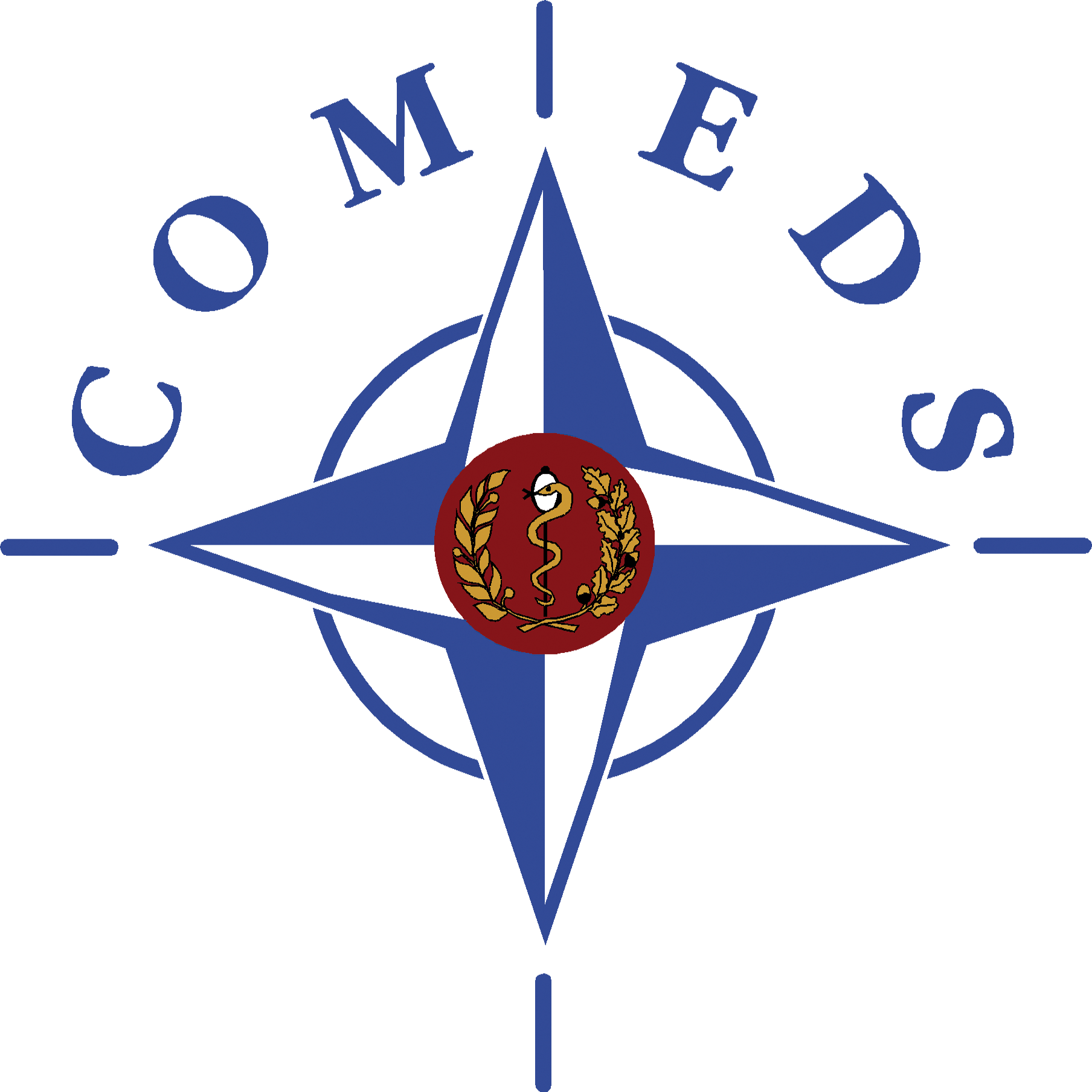
- COMEDS emblem
- Abbreviation: COMEDS
- Predecessor: EUROMED (1970)
- Formation: 1994
- Type: Medical
- Purpose: Collective security
- Headquarters: Brussels, Belgium
- Official language: English; French
- Parent organization: NATO

The Committee of Chiefs of Military Medical Services in NATO (COMEDS) is the North Atlantic Alliance's senior medical body, reporting to the NATO Military Committee. It is headed by a chairman, is composed of the Surgeons General of the allied nations and the senior medical advisers within NATO's command structure, and meets twice annually in plenary session. Supported by NATO's integral medical staff and numerous specialized multi-national working groups and panels, COMEDS acts as the central point for the development and coordination of common standards and for providing medical advice to the Military Committee.

== History ==
Since health matters within NATO were historically regarded strictly as a national responsibility, the alliance did not have a high-level collective medical authority for the first few decades of its existence. With NATO's increasing emphasis on joint operations came the need for coordinating medical support in peacekeeping, disaster-relief, and humanitarian operations.

In 1968, the defence ministers of NATO's European member states founded EUROGROUP to enhance informal co-ordination with the support of various expert advisory groups (Logistic, Training, Coordination of armaments procurement, etc.). Their chiefs of medical services founded EUROMED in 1970, which the United States, Canada, France, and the medical representatives of the major NATO commands soon joined as observers. In December 1992, all EUROGROUP activities were transferred to the Western European Union except EUROMED, which joined NATO. Military Committee document MC 335 established COMEDS on 22 October 1993, the North Atlantic Council noted its establishment on 6 December 1993, and its initial terms of reference were authorized on 4 March 1994.

== Organization ==
=== Composition ===
COMEDS comprises the Surgeons General / Chiefs of Military Medical Services of NATO nations. Other members and observers include: the senior medical advisers of the International Military Staff and of NATO's strategic commands (Allied Command Operations and Allied Command Transformation); the Surgeons General / Chiefs of Military Medical Services of participating Partnership for Peace, Mediterranean Dialogue, and Istanbul Cooperation Initiative nations; representatives of the Military Committee; NATO Standardization Office; NATO Joint Health Agriculture Food Group; Human Factors and Medicine Panel of the NATO Science & Technology Organization; NATO Centre of Excellence for Military Medicine; European Union Military Staff; and Confédération Interalliée des Officiers Médicaux de la Reserve (Interallied Confederation of Medical Reserve Officers). COMEDS may also invite partners from across the globe, non-NATO troop-contributing nations, and representatives from other organisations.

=== Chairman ===
Elected by the national Surgeons General of NATO nations for a three-year term, the Chairman represents their consensus-based views as NATO's top medical officer and principal medical adviser to the Military Committee, the North Atlantic Council, and other senior NATO organizations.

#	Chairmen	Term		Nationality	Ref
1	Major General M. J. De Coninck	1994	1999	(Belgium) Belgian	
2	Major General Roger van Hoof	1999	2005	(Belgium) Belgian	
3	Major General László Svéd	2005	2006	(Hungary) Hungarian	
4	Lieutenant General Kurt-Bernhard Nakath	2006	2009	(Germany) German	
5	Brigadier General Rob van der Meer	2009	2012	(Netherlands) Dutch	
6	Lieutenant General Gérard Jean Nédellec	2012	2015	(France) French	
7	Major General Jean-Robert Bernier	2015	2018	(Canada) Canadian	
8	Brigadier General Zoltán Bubeník	2018	2021	(Czech Republic) Czech	
9	Major General Timothy Hodgetts	2021	2024	(United Kingdom) British	
10	Brigadier General Petter Iversen	2024	Present	(Norway) Norwegian	

=== Liaison Officer ===
The Chairman's nation is responsible for providing a senior officer to serve as the COMEDS Liaison Officer to NATO Headquarters. The Liaison Officer is also the Secretary of COMEDS, its senior staff and executive officer, chair of the COMEDS Steering Group, co-chair of NATO's Medical Standardization Board, and the COMEDS' point of contact within the NATO structure and for individual nations. He/she cooperates closely with the medical branches of the International Military Staff, Allied Command Operations, and Allied Command Transformation in developments regarding defence planning, capability development, standardization needs, training and education, and certification.

=== Subgroups ===
To assist in carrying out its tasks, COMEDS has five subordinate working groups and many panels to enhance multi-national inter-operability and to progress the following areas: military medical structures, operations and procedures (including planning and capability development); force health protection; healthcare; standardization; CBRN medical issues; emergency medicine; mental health; blood; dental services; medical materiel and pharmacy; food, water safety and veterinary support; medical training; medical naval issues; special operations medical support, and health information systems and technology.

== Functions ==
COMEDS advises the Military Committee on health matters affecting NATO and serves as its coordinating body for all health-related policies, doctrines, concepts, procedures, techniques, programmes and initiatives. Its objectives include improving and expanding arrangements between member countries for coordination, standardization and interoperability in the medical field, and improving the exchange of information relating to organizational, operational, and procedural aspects of military medical services in NATO and partner nations. COMEDS also develops new concepts of medical support for operations, with emphasis on multinational health care, modularity of medical treatment facilities, and partnerships. It facilitates the development of medical capabilities in individual nations and helps improve their quality and interoperability.

== Award ==
Since 2011, COMEDS annually bestows the Dominique-Jean Larrey Award as NATO's highest medical honour. It is awarded in recognition of a significant and lasting contribution to NATO multi-nationality and/or interoperability, or to improvements in the provision of health care in NATO missions in the areas of medical support or healthcare development. The award is named after Napoleon's famous Surgeon General who introduced several medical and humanitarian innovations for battlefield health care, whose practice of treating all casualties with equal regard and without national distinction preceded the Geneva Conventions by many decades, and who was admired by Napoleon and by the leaders of the allied forces opposing him.

== See also ==
- Military Medicine
- Structure of NATO
- Surgeon General
- Dominique Jean Larrey
