= Dominique Jean Larrey =

French surgeon and soldier (1766–1842)

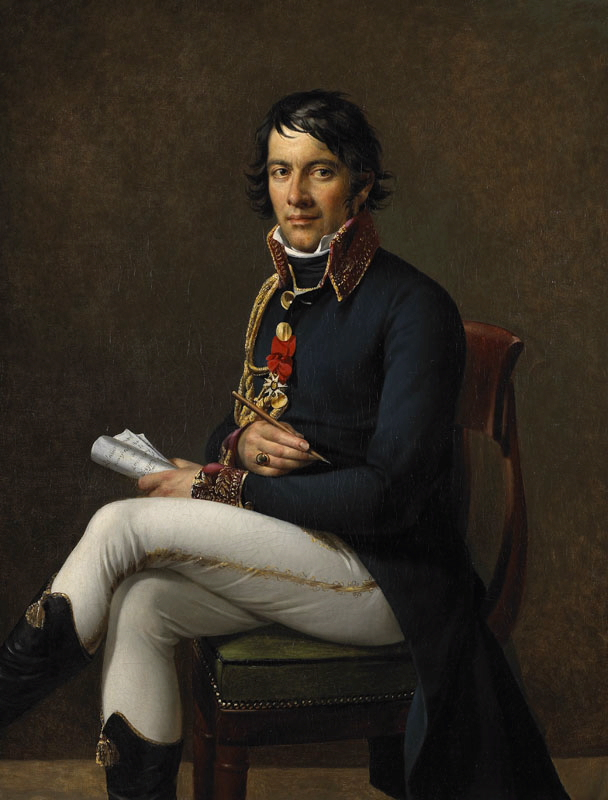
- Portrait by Marie-Guillemine Benoist, 1804
- Born: 8 July 1766; Beaudéan, France
- Died: 25 July 1842 (aged 76); Lyon, France
- Spouse: Marie-Élisabeth Laville-Leroux
- Children: Félix Hippolyte Larrey; Isaure Larrey
- Scientific career
- Fields: Surgeon

Dominique Jean, Baron Larrey (8 July 1766 – 25 July 1842) was a French surgeon and soldier best known for his service in the French Revolutionary and Napoleonic Wars. An important innovator in battlefield medicine and triage, he invented the flying ambulance and is sometimes considered the first modern military surgeon. He has been credited with 24 important surgical advances and is called the "father of modern military medicine" and "the father of emergency medical services".

== Early life and career ==
Larrey was born in Beaudéan, Bigorre, as the second of three children of Jean Larrey, a shoemaker, and Philippine Perès. His father died in 1780, When Larrey was only 13 years old. He was then sent to live with his uncle Alexis, a surgeon in Toulouse where he learned his first medical skills. Larrey excelled in this training, winning first prize in a medical competition from the Saint-Joseph de La Grave society and penning a well received thesis on Caries.

After an 8-year apprenticeship, he went to Paris to study under the renowned Pierre-Joseph Desault, who was chief surgeon at the Hôtel-Dieu de Paris. His uncle gave him a letter of introduction but money was scarce and Larrey walked all the way from Toulouse to Paris. He then went to Brest, where he was appointed surgeon in the navy and began lecturing. In 1787 he boarded a ship called the Vigilante deployed to the defense of Newfoundland, and was, at nearly 21 years-old at the time, the youngest medical officer in the French Royal Navy. The care he provided in cases of illness and his concern for ensuring a higher standard of hygiene during the voyage were so successful that, despite the hardships of a difficult journey and the hunger, thirst and Scurvy that had spread among the crew, upon its return to Brest, not a man had been lost. While in America, Larrey took an interest in the local environment, writing observations on the local flora, fauna, climate and manners, which were published years later in his Mémoires de chirurgie militaire et campagnes du baron D.J. Larrey.

In 1789, Larrey was back in Paris, where he worked with Jean-Nicolas Corvisart, Xavier Bichat and Raphaël Bienvenu Sabatier in Les Invalides. On 14 July, Larrey was present during the Storming of the Bastille and he improvised an ambulance to treat the wounded.

== Revolutionary Wars ==
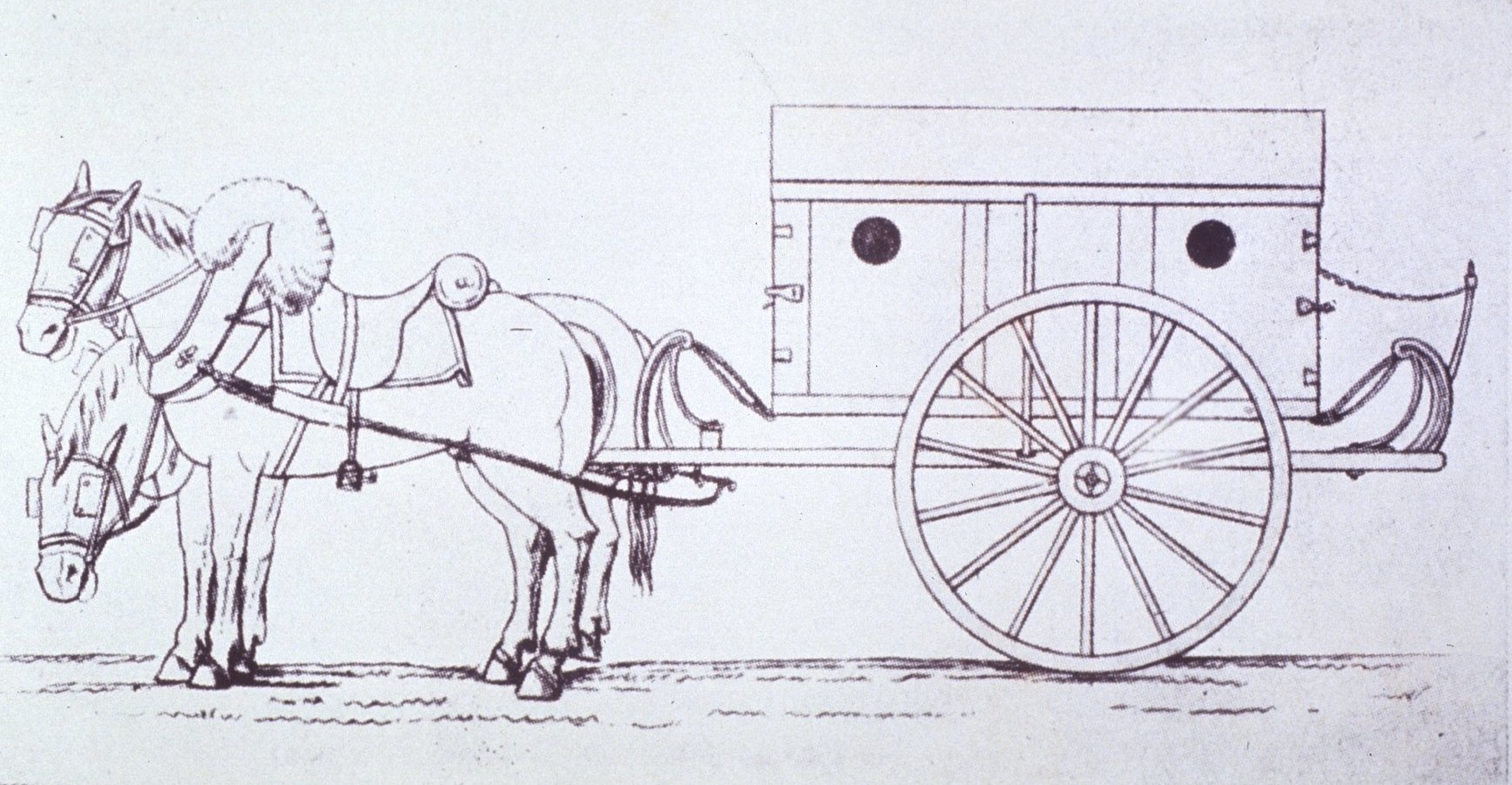
Larrey's ambulance volante, used to evacuate casualties from the battlefield

Larrey joined the French Army of the Rhine in 1792, during the War of the First Coalition. In Mainz he met with Samuel Thomas von Sömmerring. During this time, Larrey initiated the modern method of army surgery, field hospitals and the system of army ambulance corps. After seeing the speed with which the carriages of French horse artillery units maneuvered across the battlefields, Larrey adapted them as "flying ambulances" for rapid transport of the wounded and manned them with trained crews of drivers, corpsmen and litter-bearers. Larrey's innovations in military medicine and surgery advanced the standard of medical care in the French army well beyond that of its contemporaries.

At the Battle of Metz (1793) Larrey successfully demonstrated the value of field ambulances. The quartermaster-general Jacques-Pierre Orillard de Villemanzy ordered prototypes to be built, after which ambulances would be supplied to all the Republic's armies. The politicians heard of this, and ordered a national contest to find the best design, thus delaying their delivery by over two years. Larrey also increased the mobility and improved the organization of field hospitals, effectively creating a forerunner of modern field hospitals. He established a rule for the triage of war casualties, treating the wounded according to the seriousness of their injuries and urgency of need for medical care, regardless of their rank or nationality. Soldiers of enemy armies, as well as those of the French and their allies, were treated. Personally courageous, Larrey regularly worked under fire and tirelessly endeavored to rescue wounded soldiers. At one battle in 1793, he led a charge of his dragoon escort to save four injured soldiers who were being stripped of valuables by the Prussians. They were loaded into his ambulances and carried to the rear, where he operated on them and saved all their lives.

In 1794 he was sent to Toulon, where he organized the School of Surgery and Anatomy and met for the first time with Napoleon Bonaparte. He married his sweetheart, the painter Marie-Élisabeth Laville-Leroux, who had studied under Jacques-Louis David. Larrey was a devoted husband who often wrote his wife while away and the couple would go on to have two children. In Spain he fell ill and was sent back to Paris, where he worked as a professor of anatomy at the Val-de-Grâce Medical School for a short time, in 1796, before being appointed surgeon-in-chief of the Revolutionary armies in Italy at the request of Napoleon who had heard of his distinguished reputation and remembered him from Toulon.

Larrey was appointed Surgeon-in-Chief of the Army of the Orient and departed with the Egyptian campaign in 1798. When the French army was disembarking west of Alexandria, General Caffarelli got his wooden leg caught in the rigging and fell overboard. Larrey dove into the water and dragged him to the beach, saving his life. In the aftermath of the Battle of the Pyramids, wounded Mamluk soldiers were surprised that Larrey treated them with the same humanity and respect as the French wounded. Shortly before the start of Napoleon's invasion of Syria, Larrey noticed a group of British prisoners being held in deplorable conditions and asked Dupas to improve their treatment, but he refused. Larrey then went directly to Napoleon and told him of their conditions, and the general allowed them to be returned to the British on grounds that they had not directly fought against the French. At the Siege of Jaffa, an Egyptian entertainer who had been captured came to the French hospital for treatment. After helping the man, Larrey noticed the man's pet monkey, both his companion and his livelihood, was also wounded and he offered to bandage the animal. Overcome with emotion at this unexpected offer of generosity and gentleness, the man accepted and held up the monkey while Larrey bandaged it. The monkey was returned to have its bandages replaced several times and would always run up and hug Larrey. Following the victory at the Battle of Abukir, he established a medical school for army physicians in Cairo. Many of his patients at the time were affected by ophthalmy, a disease known in Europe since the Crusades, which Larrey studied and wrote about in his memoirs. He improved the transportation of wounded soldiers through the use of dromedaries, with two chests attached to each side of their hump to carry the wounded, instead of horses who had difficult movement in the desert. He was wounded during the Siege of Acre where he distinguished himself throughout the fighting and saved the life of General Arrighi who had been shot through the neck. When Jean-Baptiste Kléber was assassinated by a Syrian student in Cairo, Larrey embalmed the body which was later transported back to France for burial. The campaign ended with the Capitulation of Alexandria and Larrey returned to France in October 1801. He had been one of the privileged few offered the chance to return alongside Napoleon earlier but politely declined, saying that he would accompany him if ordered but would prefer to remain with the army who needed him more.

== Napoleonic Wars ==
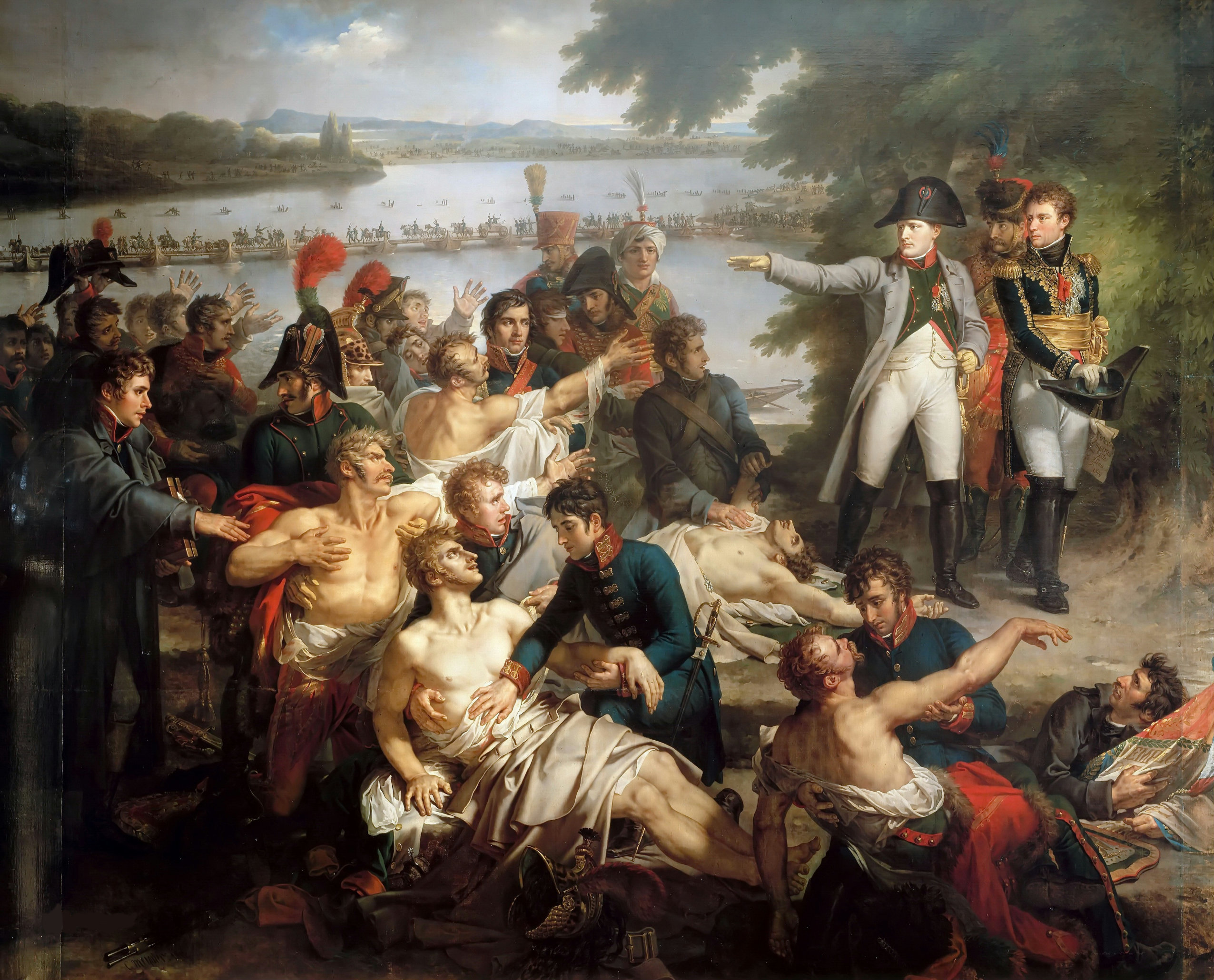
Napoleon's Return to the Island of Lobau After the Battle of Essling by Charles Meynier, 1812

Larrey was well received by Napoleon upon his return and was made Surgeon-in-Chief to his Consular and later Imperial Guard and a Commander of the Légion d'honneur on 12 May 1807. Already a revered figure throughout the army, Larrey added to his laurels during the campaigns across Europe from 1805 through 1807. He was wounded at Austerlitz and at Eylau a Russian attack on the French left flank almost overran Larrey's hospital, but he calmly finished the operation he was engaged in and declared his intention to die with his patients if need be. Fortunately, a French cavalry charge threw the enemy back and kept the hospital safe. After the battle was over, Napoleon noticed that Larrey was not wearing a sword and Larrey explained to the Emperor that he had lost it in his baggage wagon which the Russians have overrun during the fighting. Napoleon removed his own sword and handed it to Larrey, telling him "Here is mine. Accept it as a reminder of the services you rendered me at the Battle of Eylau". In 1809, he joined in the Battle of Aspern-Essling, where he operated on his close friend Marshal Jean Lannes and amputated his left leg in two minutes. He had long been the favorite of the Emperor, who commented, "If the army ever erects a monument to express its gratitude, it should do so in honor of Larrey", he was ennobled as a Baron on the field of Wagram in 1809. In 1811, Baron Larrey co-led the surgical team that performed a successful pre-anesthetic mastectomy on Frances Burney in Paris. His detailed account of this operation gives insight into early 19th century doctor-patient relationships, and early surgical methods in the home of the patient. Larrey was made head of all medical operations of the Grande Armée in the French invasion of Russia and performed wonders at Borodino where he worked himself to near exhaustion due to the scale of the casualties. Larrey survived the winter retreat although he might have died during the crossing of the Berezina river had it not been for the efforts of the common soldiers. The bridge was starting to break, threatening to leave thousands stranded on the east bank and a panicked stampede erupted. Someone recognized Larrey caught up in the chaos and called out "Monsieur Larrey! Save him who saved us" Others joined in the call until it became a chorus and the men lifted Larrey up and passed him over their heads until he was safe on the other bank. Larrey was surprised by the reactions of the men but his selfless devotion to the well being of the sick and wounded soldiers had long become the stuff of legend by 1812 and they were going to return the favor by saving him.

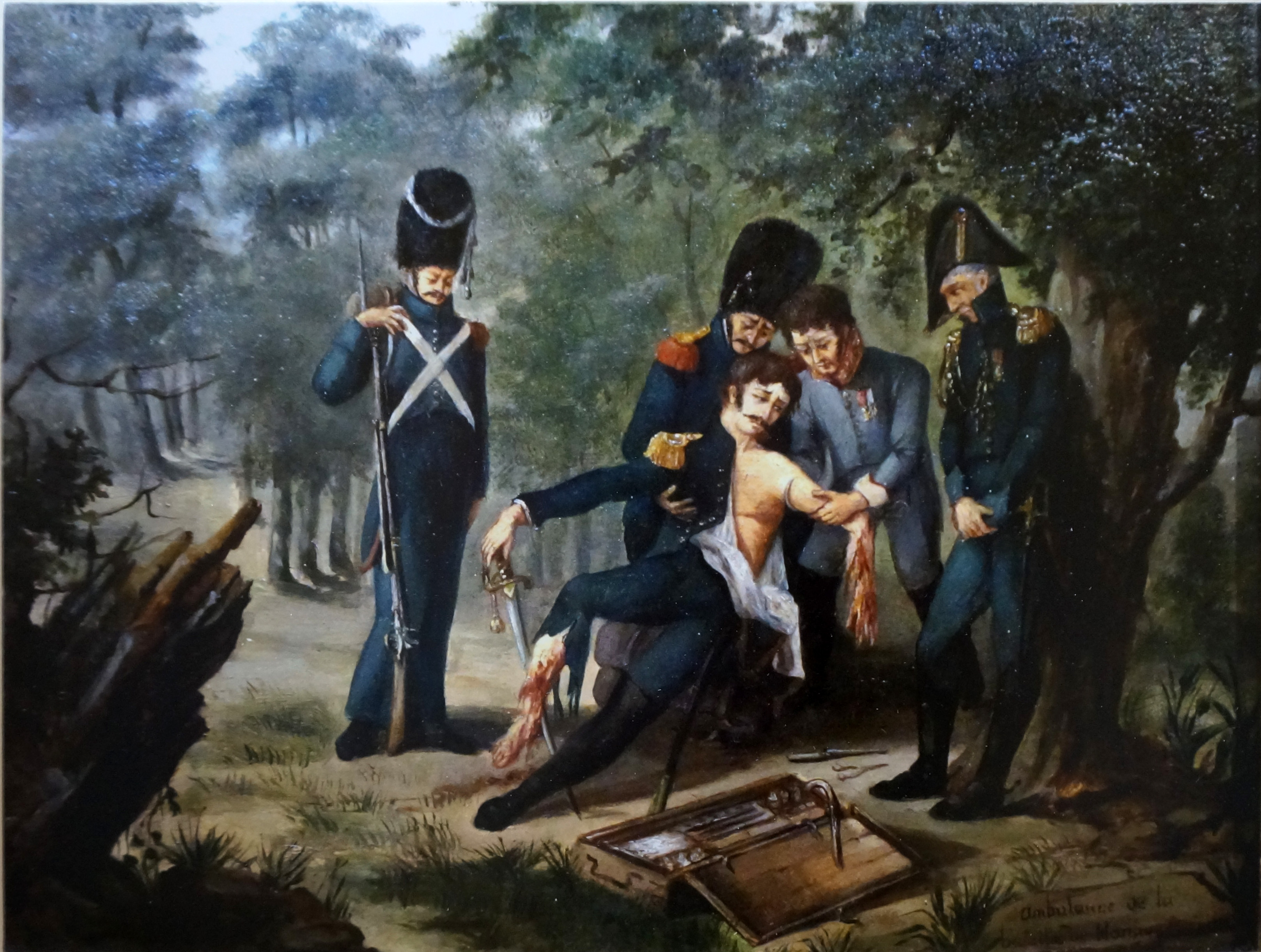
Larrey amputating the arm and leg of colonel Rebsomen at the Battle of Hanau, in 1813

Larrey continued to serve faithfully throughout the campaigns of 1813 and 1814 and when Napoleon was sent to Elba, Larrey proposed to join him, but the former Emperor refused, not wishing to make Larrey share his own fate. He rallied to Napoleon in 1815 and at Waterloo his courage under fire was noticed by the Duke of Wellington who ordered his soldiers not to fire in his direction so as to "give the brave man time to gather up the wounded" and saluted "the courage and devotion of an age that is no longer ours". Larrey was wounded and knocked unconscious at the end of the battle. He attempted to escape to the French border once he had regained consciousness but was taken prisoner by the Prussians who bandaged his wound but wanted to execute him on the spot. Larrey was recognized by one of the German surgeons who had attended a lecture he gave years earlier in Berlin and pleaded for his life. Larrey was first sent to General Bülow who improved his condition by giving him new clothes and untying his hands, and then sent him on to Field Marshal Blücher. Larrey had previously saved the life of Blücher's son when he was wounded near Dresden and taken prisoner by the French. Blücher treated him with respect and sent word to his wife that Larrey was alive, as the French had initially thought he had been killed on the field of Waterloo. Larrey was pardoned, invited to Blücher's dinner table as an honored guest and sent back to France with money and proper clothes. Napoleon died in exile on May 5, 1821 and in his will, the Emperor left Larrey the sum of 100,000 francs and described him as "the most virtuous man I ever knew".

== Later career ==
After the empire, Larrey's illustrious reputation ensured he was given multiple opportunities abroad, including those from the United States, Russia, and Brazil. However, he chose to remain in France. He devoted the remainder of his life to writing, but after the death of Napoleon he started a new medical career in the army as chief-surgeon in the Royal Guard of Louis XVIII. In 1826 he visited England, received well by British surgeons. In 1829 he was appointed in the Institut de France. A year later, he was elected as a member of the American Philosophical Society. When the July Revolution broke out in Paris in 1830, Larrey was on hand in the city and diligently tended to the wounded. The new French king, Louis Philippe I, made him a consultant surgeon and medical director at Les Invalides, a retirement home for aged and disabled soldiers. When Napoleon's remains were returned to France in 1840, Larrey insisted on braving the cold to pay his respects as the emperor's funeral procession passed through the streets of Paris. In 1842 Larrey went to Algiers for a health inspection, together with his son, but contracted pneumonia on his way back, dying in Lyon on 25 July. His body was taken to Paris and buried at the Père-Lachaise Cemetery. His remains were transferred to Les Invalides and re-interred near Napoleon's tomb in December 1992.

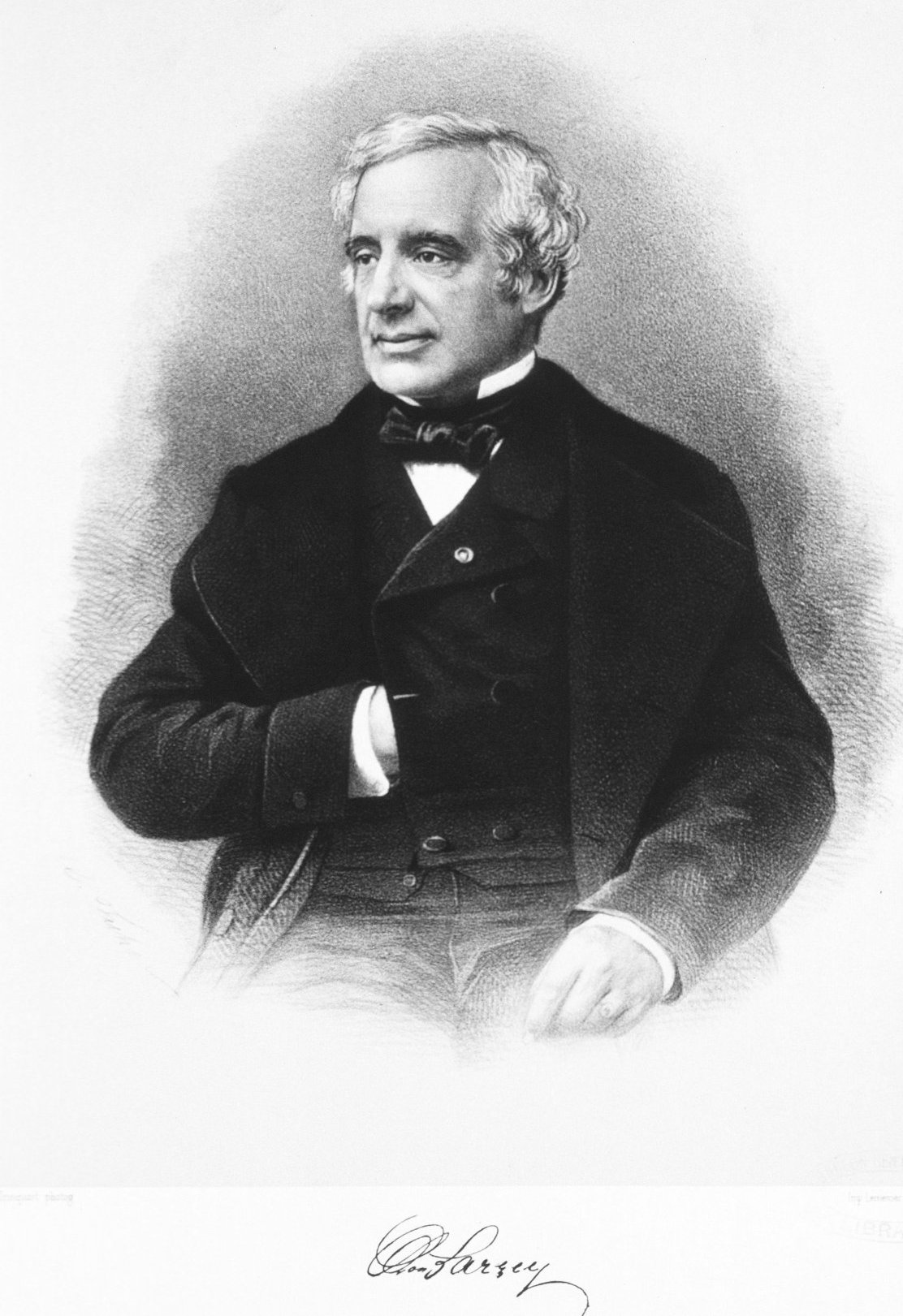
Larrey's son, Félix Hippolyte Larrey (1808–1895), also became a military doctor

Larrey's writings are still regarded as valuable sources of surgical and medical knowledge and have been translated into all modern languages. Between 1800 and 1840 at least 28 books or articles were published. His son Hippolyte (born 1808) was surgeon-in-ordinary to the emperor Napoleon III.

Larrey is credited with 24 significant surgical advances and has been referred to as both the "father of modern military medicine" and "the father of emergency medical services".

== Works ==
- Relation historique et chirurgicale de l'expédition de l'armée d'orient, en Egypte et en Syrie. Demonville, Paris 1803.
- Mémoires de chirurgie militaire, et campagnes. J. Smith, Paris 1812. (digitalized books: Volume1, Volume 2, Volume 3)
  - Richard H. Willmott: Memoirs of military surgery. Cushing, Baltimore 1814. (volumes 1–3, digitalized book)
  - John C. Mercer: Surgical memoirs of the campaigns of Russia, Germany, and France. Carey & Lea, Philadelphia 1832. (volume 4, digitalized Book)

== NATO award ==
The Dominique-Jean Larrey Award is the North Atlantic Alliance's highest medical honour. It is bestowed annually by NATO's senior medical body, the Committee of Chiefs of Military Medical Services in NATO (COMEDS), which is composed of the Surgeons General of NATO and partner nations. It is awarded in recognition of a significant and lasting contribution to NATO multi-nationality and/or interoperability, or to improvements in the provision of health care in NATO missions in the areas of medical support or healthcare development.

== Bibliography ==
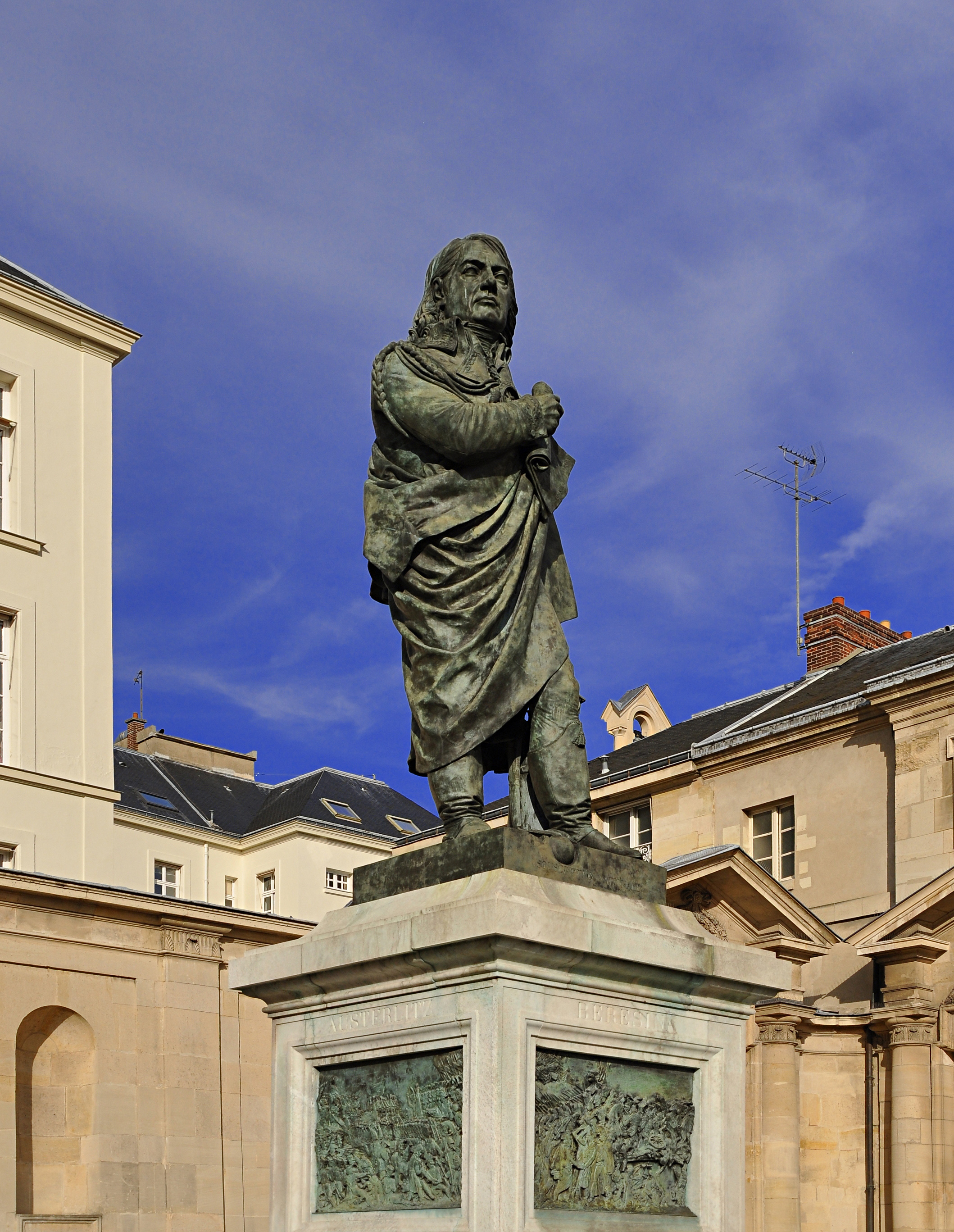
His statue in bronze, as sculpted by David d'Angers in 1843, is standing in the courtyard outside the Val-de-Grâce military hospital, where Larrey was a professor in 1796

- Baker D, Cazalaà JB, Carli P (September 2005), "Resuscitation great. Larrey and Percy—a tale of two barons", Resuscitation, 66 (3): 259–62, doi:10.1016/j.resuscitation.2005.03.009, PMID 15990216
- Beasley AW (December 2000), "To study the healing art", The Australian and New Zealand Journal of Surgery, 70 (12): 892–7, doi:10.1046/j.1440-1622.2000.01989.x, PMID 11167578
- Bissi A (October 1989), "[Not Available]", Kos (in Italian) (49): 38–47, PMID 11629939
- Bodemer CW (July 1982), "Baron Dominique Jean Larrey, Napoleon's surgeon", Bulletin of the American College of Surgeons, 67 (7): 18–21, PMID 10315971
- Brewer LA (December 1986), "Baron Dominique Jean Larrey (1766–1842). Father of modern military surgery, innovater, humanist", The Journal of Thoracic and Cardiovascular Surgery, 92 (6): 1096–8, doi:10.1016/S0022-5223(19)35826-X, PMID 3537533
- Haddad FS (September 2004), "Baron Larrey: a role model to be emulated", Journal of the American College of Surgeons, 199 (3): 519, doi:10.1016/j.jamcollsurg.2004.05.266, PMID 15325631
- Burton, June K. (2001), Two "Better Halves" in the Worst of Times – Adrienne Noailles Lafayette (1759–1807) and Fanny Burney d'Arblay (1752–1840) as Medical and Surgical Patients under the First Empire (PDF) (published January 26, 2001), pp. 18–21, archived from the original (PDF) on March 13, 2016
- Csillag I (February 1984), "Ferenc Eckstein and military surgery during the Napoleonic wars (Dominique-Jean Larrey)" [Ferenc Eckstein and military surgery during the Napoleonic wars (Dominique-Jean Larrey)], Orvosi Hetilap (in Hungarian), 125 (8): 467–70, PMID 6366693
- DIBLE JH (April 1959), "D. J. Larrey, A Surgeon of the Revolution, Consulate, and Empire", Medical History, 3 (2): 100–7, doi:10.1017/s0025727300024388, PMC 1034461, PMID 13643144
- DiGioia JM, Rocko JM, Swan KG (May 1983), "Baron Larrey. Modern military surgeon", The American Surgeon, 49 (5): 226–30, PMID 6342487
- Egeblad K (1979), "[Not Available]", Dansk Medicinhistorisk Årbog (in Danish): 1979, 132–59, PMID 11628370
- Egeblad K (1978), "[Not Available]", Dansk Medicinhistorisk Årbog (in Danish): 77–123, PMID 11627862
- Fackler ML (March 1989), "Misinterpretations concerning Larrey's methods of wound treatment", Surgery, Gynecology & Obstetrics, 168 (3): 280–2, PMID 2645668
- Faria MA (September 1990), "Dominique-Jean Larrey: Napoleon's surgeon from Egypt to Waterloo", Journal of the Medical Association of Georgia, 79 (9): 693–5, PMID 2212907
- Feinsod, Moshe (2002), "The amputated leg—a tale of scientific curiosity—1792", Harefuah, vol. 141, no. 2 (published Feb 2002), pp. 210–2, 220, PMID 11905097
- Feinsod, M (1998), "The surgeon and the Emperor—a humanitarian on the battlefield", Harefuah, vol. 135, no. 9 (published Nov 1, 1998), pp. 340–3, 408, PMID 10911440
- Feinsod, M; Aharon-Peretz, J (1994), "Baron Larrey's description of traumatic aphasia", Journal of the History of the Neurosciences, vol. 3, no. 1 (published Jan 1994), pp. 45–52, doi:10.1080/09647049409525587, PMID 11618806
- Ferrarelli, L (1954), "The physicians of the Emperor", Minerva Chirurgica, vol. 9, no. 1 (published Jan 15, 1954), pp. 32–5, PMID 13153977
- Haas, L F (Feb 1994), "Dominique Jean Larrey (1766–1842)", J. Neurol. Neurosurg. Psychiatry, vol. 57, no. 2, p. 133, doi:10.1136/jnnp.57.2.133, ISSN 0022-3050, PMC 1072437, PMID 8126493
- Burris, DG; Welling, DR; Rich, NM (2004), "Dominique Jean Larrey and the principles of humanity in warfare", Journal of the American College of Surgeons, 198 (5): 831–5, doi:10.1016/j.jamcollsurg.2003.12.025, PMID 15110817
- Hakulinen, E (1989), "The French revolution—a revolution even for health care", Läkartidningen, vol. 86, no. 28–29 (published Jul 12, 1989), pp. 2535–7, PMID 2674570
- HALL, D P (1959), "Our surgical heritage; Europe", Am. J. Surg., vol. 98, no. 1 (published Jul 1959), pp. 130–1, PMID 13661525
- Hau, T (1982), "The surgical practice of Dominique Jean Larrey", Surgery, Gynecology & Obstetrics, vol. 154, no. 1 (published Jan 1982), pp. 89–94, PMID 7031942
- Hillemand, P; Gilbrin, E (1978), "Not Available", Histoire des Sciences Médicales, vol. 12, no. 3, pp. 255–7, PMID 11627946
- Jellinek, E H (2002), "An unlikely aphasiologist: D J Larrey (1766–1842)", Journal of the Royal Society of Medicine, vol. 95, no. 7 (published Jul 2002), pp. 368–70, doi:10.1177/014107680209500714, PMC 1279946, PMID 12091516
- Jensen, J E (Jul 1981), "Napoleonic medicine", Maryland State Medical Journal, 30 (7): 66–8, ISSN 0025-4363, PMID 7024659
- Lefebvre, P; Cornet, A; Sicard, A (1990), "Not Available", Histoire des Sciences Médicales, vol. 24, no. 3–4, pp. 259–63, PMID 11638332
- Lefebvre, P; Cornet, A; Sicard, A (1995), "The transfer of Baron Larrey's ashes from the Père Lachaise cemetery to the Invalides (December 14–15, 1992)", Histoire des Sciences Médicales, vol. 29, no. 1, pp. 23–7, PMID 11640449
- Leonov, I T (1992), "D. J. Larrey and N. I. Pirogov (on the 225th anniversary of the birth of D. J. Larrey)", Vestn. Khir. Im. I. I. Grek., vol. 149, no. 7–8, pp. 117–9, PMID 1341349
- Marchioni, Jean (2004), "Larrey, a legendary surgeon, a current work", La Revue du Praticien, vol. 54, no. 3 (published Feb 15, 2004), pp. 342–5, PMID 15134246
- McIntyre, Neil (2002), "The Barons Larrey: Dominique Jean (1766–1842); Hippolyte (1808–1895)", Journal of Medical Biography, vol. 10, no. 3 (published Aug 2002), p. 185, doi:10.1177/096777200201000316, PMID 12114954, S2CID 5558961
- Mirskiĭ, M B (2007), "An outstanding field surgeon (devoted to the 240th anniversary of D. Larrey's birth", Voenno-meditsinskiĭ Zhurnal, vol. 328, no. 1 (published Jan 2007), pp. 75–9, PMID 17436718
- Moore, A R (1978), "Preanesthetic mastectomy: a patient's experience", Surgery, vol. 83, no. 2 (published Feb 1978), pp. 200–5, PMID 341385
- Nau, Jean-Yves (2005), "I, Dominique Jean Larrey, baron and surgeon in chief of the Grand Army", Revue Médicale Suisse, vol. 1, no. 2 (published Jan 12, 2005), p. 186, PMID 15773223
- O'Sullivan, S T; O'Shaughnessy, M; O'Connor, T P (1995), "Baron Larrey and cold injury during the campaigns of Napoleon", Annals of Plastic Surgery, vol. 34, no. 4 (published Apr 1995), pp. 446–9, doi:10.1097/00000637-199504000-00020, PMID 7793796, S2CID 42758258
- Pai-Dhungat, J V; Parikh, Falguni (2006), "Medical philaely (Medical theme on stamps). Dominique J. Larrey (1766–1842). Northern France Ambulance, 1918 stamp, Grenada-1970", The Journal of the Association of Physicians of India, vol. 54 (published Oct 2006), p. 811, PMID 17214278
- Quijano-Pitman, F (1997), "Surgical drainage with rubber tubes and Baron Larrey's mobile ambulances introduced by Dr. Ignacio Gama", Gaceta Médica de México, vol. 133, no. 3, p. 249, PMID 9303873
- Richardson, R G (1977), "Larrey – what manner of man?", Proc. R. Soc. Med., vol. 70, no. 7 (published Jul 1977), pp. 490–4, doi:10.1177/003591577707000713, PMC 1543132, PMID 331340
- Richardson, R G (1974), Larrey: Surgeon to Napoleon's Imperial Guard, John Murray
- Rich, Norman M; Burris, David G; Welling, David R; Rignault, Daniel P (2006), "The Larrey legacy: two hundred years on", Current Surgery, 63 (2): 119–21, doi:10.1016/j.cursur.2005.12.008, PMID 16520113
- Rüttimann, B (1979), "Larrey's amputation technic", Gesnerus, vol. 36, no. 1–2, pp. 140–55, PMID 381112
- Skandalakis, Panagiotis N; Lainas, Panagiotis; Zoras, Odyseas; Skandalakis, John E; Mirilas, P (2006), ""To afford the wounded speedy assistance": Dominique Jean Larrey and Napoleon", World Journal of Surgery, 30 (8) (published Aug 2006): 1392–9, doi:10.1007/s00268-005-0436-8, PMID 16850154, S2CID 42597837
- Soubiran, A (1966), "Larrey. The providence of soldiers (1766–1842)", La Presse Médicale, vol. 74, no. 34, pp. 1785–6, PMID 5328565
- Stembrowicz, W (1995), "Dominique Jean Larrey (1766–1842) the author of the work: On wounds of the pericardial sac and heart", Archiwum Historii I Filozofii Medycyny / Polskii Towarzystwo Historii Medycyny I Farmacji, vol. 58, no. 3, pp. 311–28, PMID 11624807
- James J. Walsh, "Dominique-Jean Larrey", Catholic Encyclopedia
- Wangensteen, S D; Wangensteen, O H (1971), "Successful pre-Listerian antiseptic management of compound fracture: Crowther (1802), Larrey (1824), and Bennion (ca. 1840)", Surgery, vol. 69, no. 6 (published Jun 1971), pp. 811–24, PMID 4931133
- Welling, David R; Burris, David G; Rich, Norman M (2006), "Delayed recognition – Larrey and Les Invalides", J. Am. Coll. Surg., vol. 202, no. 2 (published Feb 2006), pp. 373–6, doi:10.1016/j.jamcollsurg.2005.08.024, PMID 16427565
- Wilson, T (1997), "The ambulance – Larrey's legacy", Scalpel & Tongs : American Journal of Medical Philately, vol. 41, pp. 82–3, PMID 11619525
- Wybieralski, A (1966), "Dominique Jean Larrey (1766–1842) On the 200 anniversary of his birth", Archiwum Historii Medycyny, vol. 29, no. 3, pp. 313–20, PMID 5335562
- Zimmerman, L M (1968), "Humanity and compassion in medicine (Ambroise Paré, Baron Dominique-Jean Larrey)", The Chicago Medical School Quarterly, vol. 27, no. 4, pp. 233–4, PMID 4913343
- "The immediate care of the eyes in Napoleonic France", Anaesthesia, vol. 31, no. 3 (published Apr 1976), p. 439, 1976, doi:10.1111/j.1365-2044.1976.tb12341.x, PMID 776029, S2CID 32079369
