= Rob van der Meer =

Netherlands Army Brigadier General

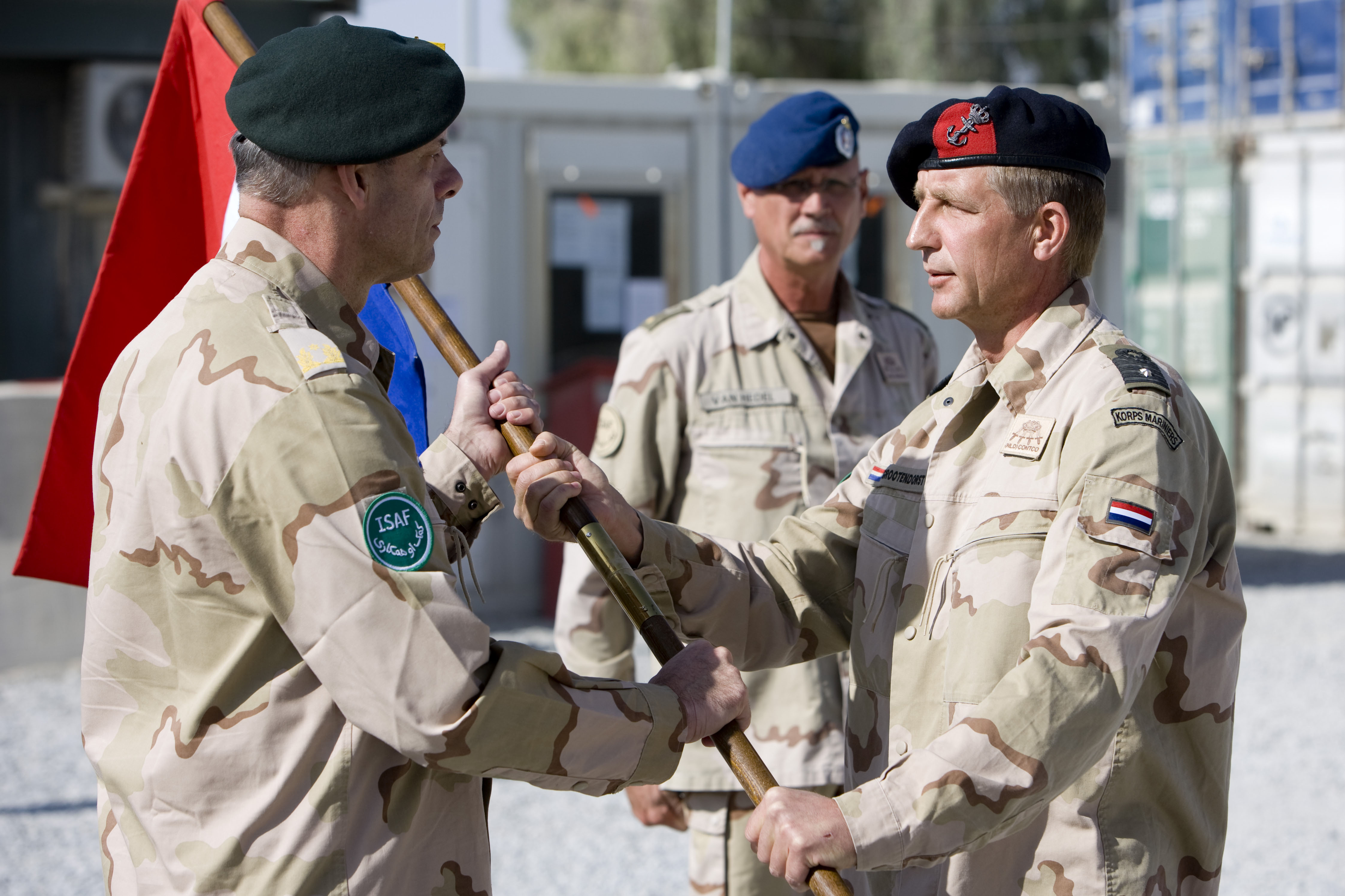
Van der Meer (left) takes over command of the armed forces of the Netherlands in Afghanistan

Rob van der Meer is a Dutch retired military physician and brigadier general who served as the Surgeon General of the Netherlands from 2007 until 2013 and the 5th chairman of the committee of Surgeons General of NATO nations from 2009 until 2012.

After enrolling in the Royal Netherlands Army, he graduated from the Free University Amsterdam as a physician in 1981. He served as a medical officer with the 12th Armoured Brigade, the 1st Army Corps Logistic Command, and as commander of the 131st Heavy Surgical Field Hospital Company before training as a staff officer at the General Staff College and as a public health physician at the Institute for Social Health Care in Utrecht. He then contributed to or led several strategic health system reform initiatives as a staff officer or as chief of the Army Surgeon General's Medical Policy Branch. He was appointed the first commander of the Institute for Co-operation of Defence and Partnership-Hospitals in 2003, Commander of the Health Care Agency Group in 2004, and Surgeon General in 2007. He was elected Chairman of the Committee of Chiefs of Military Medical Services in NATO in 2009, the North Atlantic Alliance's senior medical adviser. During his term, he spent several months as commander of all Dutch forces deployed in Afghanistan. Since his retirement in 2013, he has served in various civil advisory positions.

He was made a Knight in the Order of Orange-Nassau by Queen Beatrix of the Netherlands and awarded the Honorary Medal of the Interallied Confederation of Medical Reserve Officers (CIOMR).
