= Spörl =

Spörl or Spoerl is a German surname. Notable people with the surname include:

- Harald Spörl (born 1966), German footballer and scout
- Heinrich Spoerl (1887–1955), German writer
