= Manuel Vermeire =

Belgian printmaker (born 1987)

Manuel Vermeire (born 12 July 1987) is a Belgian printmaker whose work mainly consists in reproducing paintings in the form of wood-engravings.

== Biography ==
Manuel Vermeire was born in Chiusdino (Siena) on July 12, 1987, the son of Belgian parents who had moved to Italy a few years earlier.

Today, his wood-engravings follow, in the footsteps of past masters such as Timothy Cole, the tradition of reproducing famous paintings in a print version.

== Awards ==
- Milan, Italy: First prize in the 2018 graphic works competition “Opere su Carta” at the Circuiti Dinamici Gallery. Solo exhibition in autumn 2018.
- Torredembarra, Wood Engraving Competition: La Torre de l'Encenall, Joint First Prize winner, 2016.
- Paris, Wood Engraving Competition Jean Chièze, First Prize winner, 2015.
- Paris, Musée des Avelines: Wood Engraving Competition Jean Chièze, Honor Prize winner, 2009.
- Colle Val d’Elsa, Italy, Associazione Culturale Mino Maccari: First prize in the Concorso Mino Maccari per la Satira Grafica, July 2007.

== Public and private collections ==
His works are in the collection of the 'Museo dell'Incisione', Palazzo dei Paleologi, Acqui Terme, Italy; the collection of the 'Internationaal Ex-Libris Centrum Sint Niklaas' in Belgium; the collection of the 'Association Graver Maintenant', Paris; the collection of the 'Association Jean Chièze pour l'encouragement à la gravure sur bois', Paris; the collection of the Museum Florean (Engraving Salon Carbunari) in Baia Mare, Romania; the collection of the 'American Society of Bookplate Collectors and Designers' in San Antonio, Texas; the collection of the 'Asociaciòn Mexicana de Exlibris'; the collection of the Miejska Galeria Sztuki in Lódz (Poland).

His works are in private collections in Belgium, France, Italy, Ireland, Australia, Russia, the Czech Republic and the United States
