= Barend van der Meer =

Dutch Golden Age still life painter

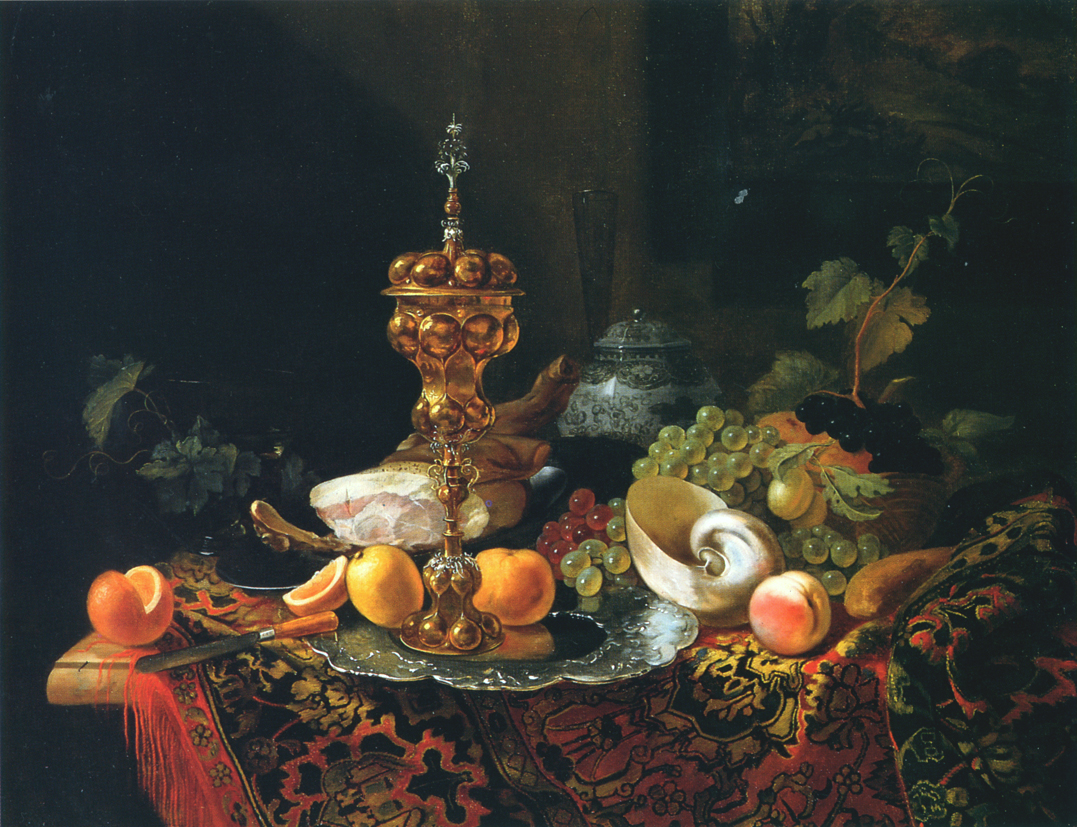
Still life with bacon, fruit, and metallic objects on a table covered with an oriental carpet

Barend van der Meer (1659–1700) was a Dutch Golden Age still life painter.

Van der Meer was born and died in Haarlem. According to the RKD he was taught by his father Jan van der Meer I and became a member of the Haarlem Guild of St. Luke in 1681. In 1683 he married and moved to Amsterdam. He was a follower of Willem Kalf and is known for still-life paintings and vanitas pieces. He was the brother of the landscape painter Jan Vermeer van Haarlem.
