= Moritz Hohenbaum van der Meer =

Moritz Hohenbaum van der Meer, also known as Mauritius Hohenbaum van der Meer, (25 June 1718 – 18 December 1795) was a Swiss Benedictine historian.

He was born at Spörl, near Belgrade. He entered Rheinau as a student in 1730, made vows there in 1734, was ordained priest in 1741, became professor in 1744, was prior of the monastery from 1758 to 1774, keeper of the monastic archives from 1759 till his death, and secretary of the Swiss Benedictine Congregation during the last nineteen years of his life. The episcopal See of Lausanne which was offered him by the pope he refused to accept. His numerous writings (seventy-six separate treatises) are for the most part historical studies on his own and other monasteries. He also wrote a history of the Swiss Benedictine Congregation (1602–1785), a life of St. Fintan, and some ascetical treatises. His historical works are nearly all written in Latin and fill fifty-nine folio and twenty-three quarto volumes. Most of these works, together with fifty-two volumes of epistolary correspondence are at present in the cantonal library of Zurich. He died, aged 77, at Rheinau Abbey, near Schaffhausen in Switzerland.
