= Vermeersch =

Vermeersch is a Dutch toponymic surname most common in the Belgian province of West Flanders. It is a contraction of van der Meersch, where meersch (with the same root as "marsh") is a Flemish term for a floodplain. Notable people with the surname include:

== Vermeersch ==
- Etienne Vermeersch (1934–2019), Belgian philosopher
- Florian Vermeersch (born 1997), Belgian cyclist
- Gianni Vermeersch (born 1992), Belgian cyclist
- Hannah Vermeersch (born 1992), Australian rower
- Hans Vermeersch (born 1957), Belgian composer and conductor
- Jeannette Vermeersch (1910–2001), French politician
- Lowie Vermeersch (born 1974), Belgian designer
- Niels Vermeersch (born 1988), founder of micronation Grand Duchy of Flandrensis
- Paul Vermeersch (born 1973), Canadian poet
- Peter Vermeersch (born 1959), Belgian musician and composer
- Sem Vermeersch (born 1968), Belgian academic
- Stephan Vermeersch, Belgian clarinettist and saxophonist

== Van der Meersch ==
- Anke Van dermeersch (born 1972), Belgian politician and former beauty queen
- Charlotte Vandermeersch (born 1983), Belgian actress
- Jacob van der Meersch, Governor of Mauritius for the Dutch East India company from 1644 to 1648
- Jean-André van der Meersch (1734–1792), Flemish general, leading figure in the Brabant Revolution
- Léon Vandermeersch (1928–2021), French sinologist
- Maxence Van Der Meersch (1910–2001), French Flemish writer

== See also ==
- Vermeer
