= Zoltán Bubeník =

Leading surgeon to the North Atlantic Alliance

Zoltán Bubeník (born 19 July 1966 in Šaľa) is the Czech surgeon general and the chief medical adviser to the North Atlantic Alliance as the 8th Chairman of COMEDS, the committee of Surgeons General of NATO and partner nations.

After graduating in 1990 from the Jan Evangelista Purkyně Military Medical Academy in Hradec Králové, Bubeník underwent postgraduate training at the Central Military Hospital in Prague, served as a regimental and garrison medical officer, deputy and chief of several departments and branches at the military medical headquarters, and deputy director of the Military Medical Agency. He was appointed surgeon general and Director of the Military Medical Agency in 2015 and chaired the World CBRN and Medical Congress in 2016 and 2018. He was elected Chairman of COMEDS and NATO's chief medical adviser for a three-year term beginning at the end of November 2018.

Bubeník completed the General Staff post-graduate study at the University of Defence in Brno in 2010. He has been awarded the Medal of the Armed Forces of the Czech Republic, the Cross of Merit of the Minister of Defence of the Czech Republic, the Commemorative Cross of the Chief of Staff of Slovak Armed Forces, the Honorary Badge of ACR "In Merits", and medals for operational service in the Balkans and in Afghanistan.
