= Jan Vermeer van Haarlem the Elder =

Dutch painter

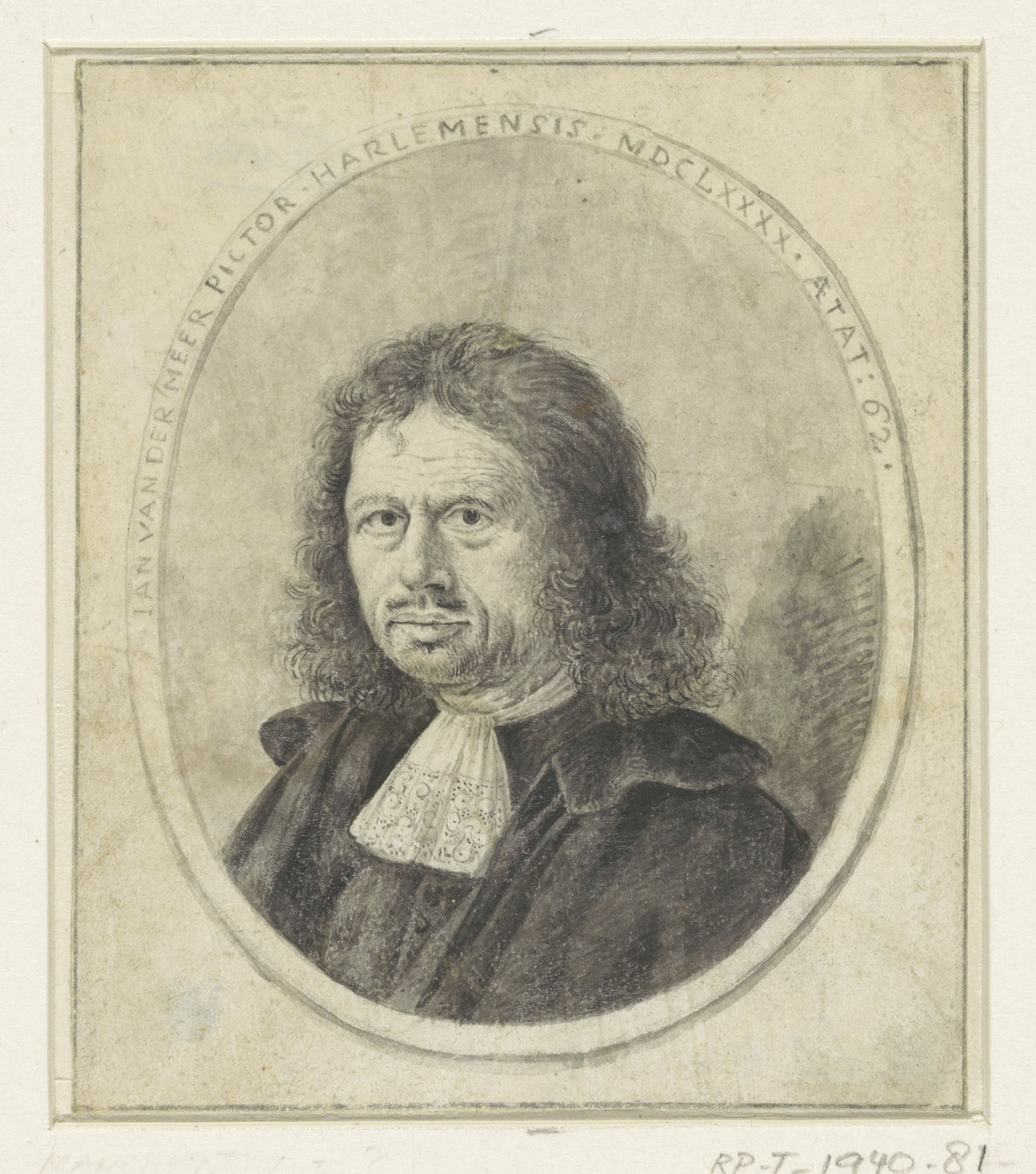
Portrait of Jan Vermeer van Haarlem the Elder

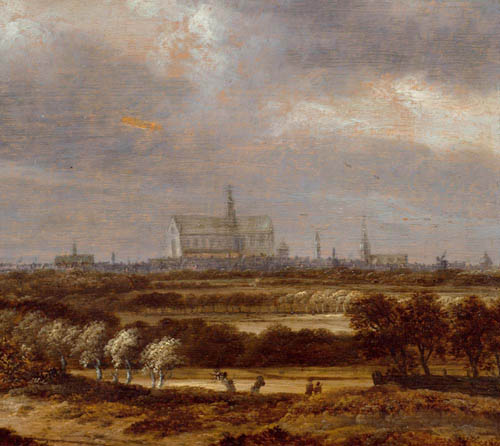
View of St. Bavochurch on the Haarlem skyline.

Jan Vermeer van Haarlem the Elder (1628 in Haarlem – 1691 in Haarlem), was a Dutch Golden Age landscape painter and the father of Jan Vermeer van Haarlem the Younger.

According to the RKD he was the grandson of Janneke Knijff (aunt of Wouter Knijff) and was taught by Jacob Willemszoon de Wet. He was the brother of Isaac and the father of Barend and Jan II. He is known for landscapes in the manner of Jacob van Ruisdael.
