= Jan Vermeer van Haarlem =

Dutch Golden Age painter (1656–1705)

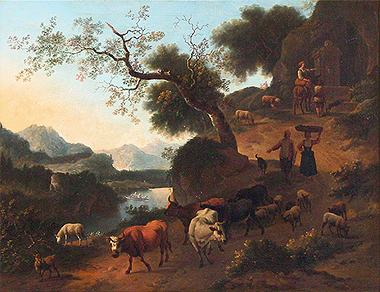
Landscape with farm animals and peasants

Jan Vermeer van Haarlem, or Jan van der Meer II (1656 – May 28, 1705) was a Dutch Golden Age painter from Haarlem. A landscape painter primarily, he was baptized there on November 29, 1656.

== Biography ==
According to the RKD he was taught by his father, the landscape painter Jan Vermeer van Haarlem the Elder and became a follower of Nicolaes Berchem. He was the brother of the painters Isaac and Barend, and married the sister of Cornelis Dusart. He seems to have spent some time in Amsterdam but was back in Haarlem in 1681-1683 where he married and joined the Haarlem Guild of St. Luke. He is known for italianate landscapes in the manner of his father and Berchem, and signed his works "J v der meer de jonge" (Jan van der Meer the Younger).
