= Haerlempjes =

Genre of landscape painting

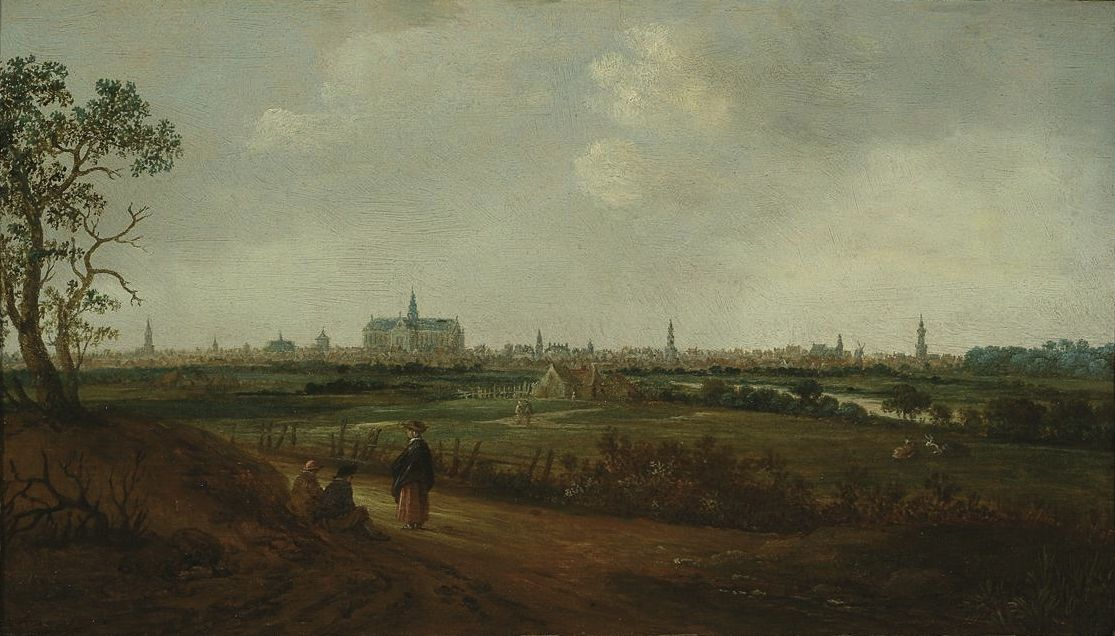
Early Haerlempje from the 1630s by Reyer Claesz Suycker

Haerlempjes refer to a specific genre of landscape painting that includes a view of Haarlem (formerly spelled Haerlem). It is used most often to refer to Jacob van Ruisdael's panoramic views of the city, but the term is derived from mentions in Haarlem archives as a type of painting included in household inventories. The diminutive suffix "pje" would denote a small, cabinet-sized painting, but even the largest landscapes may be referred to as Haerlempjes today.

== Background ==
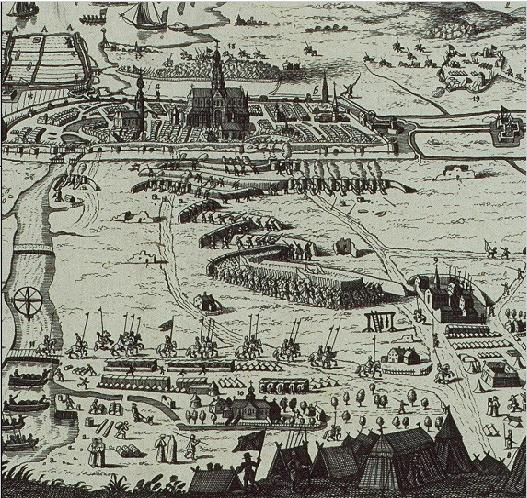
View of Haarlem from the North during the siege of Haarlem, historical print from 1628

In his biography of Albert van Ouwater, Karel van Mander claimed that It is said from the mouths of the oldest painters, that landscape painting originated in Haarlem. Van Mander was writing in 1604 for his Haarlem-sponsored Schilder-boeck, and his was one of many initiatives to rebuild the city and glorify its history. After his book was published, the city attracted several landscape painters in the 1620s, including Esaias van de Velde, Jan van Goyen and the Ruisdael brothers Salomon and Isaack.

Haarlem is a bustling city today that makes up part of the Randstad area of the Netherlands, so it helps when looking at these old paintings to orient oneself according to old maps.

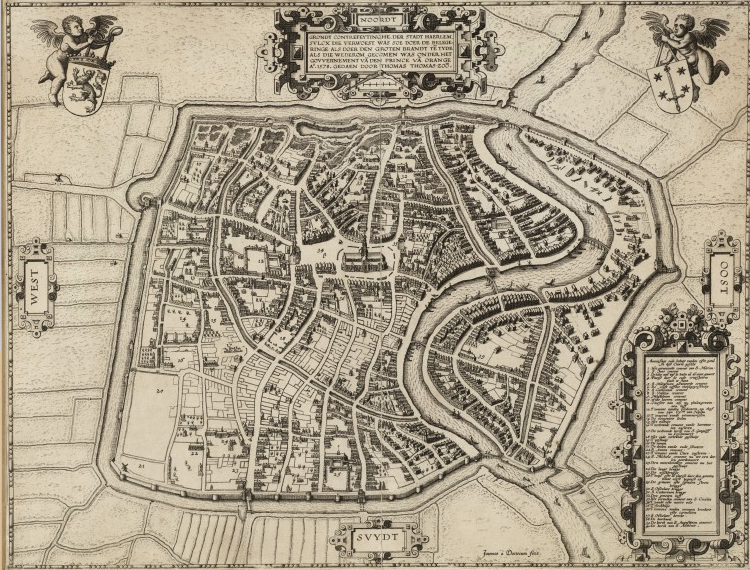
Map of Haarlem after the siege in 1578, showing the damage from fire

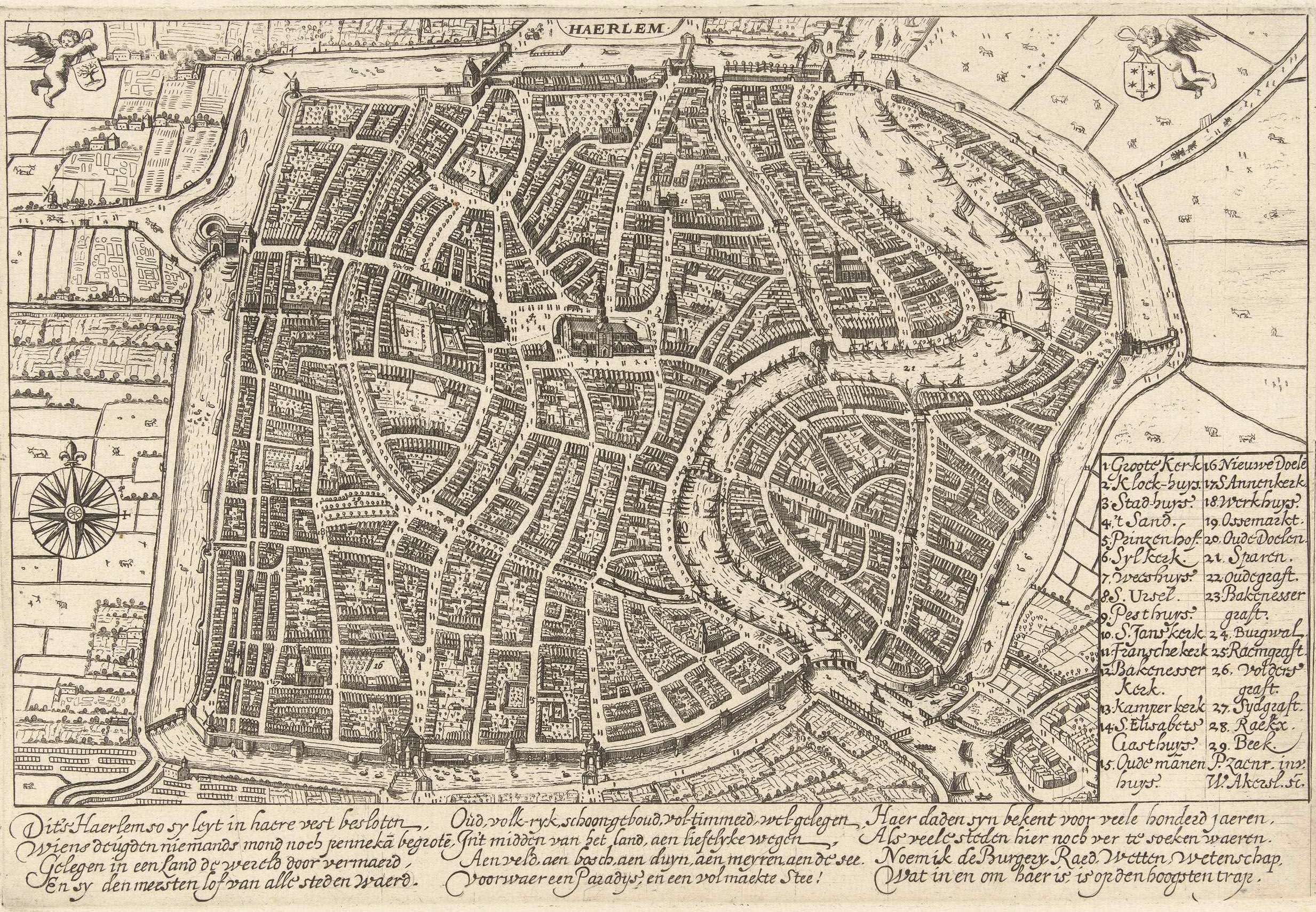
Map from 1628

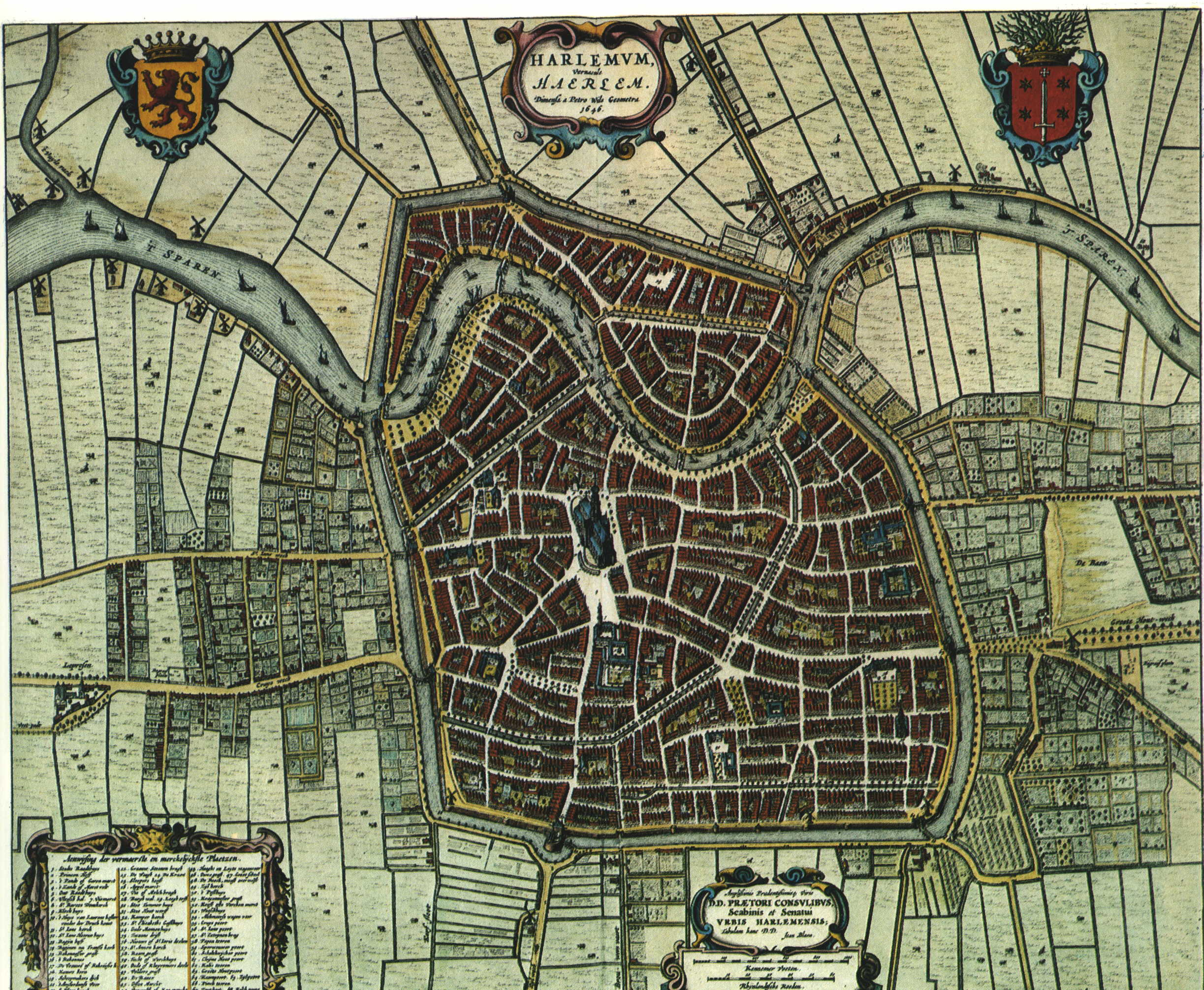
Map from 1652

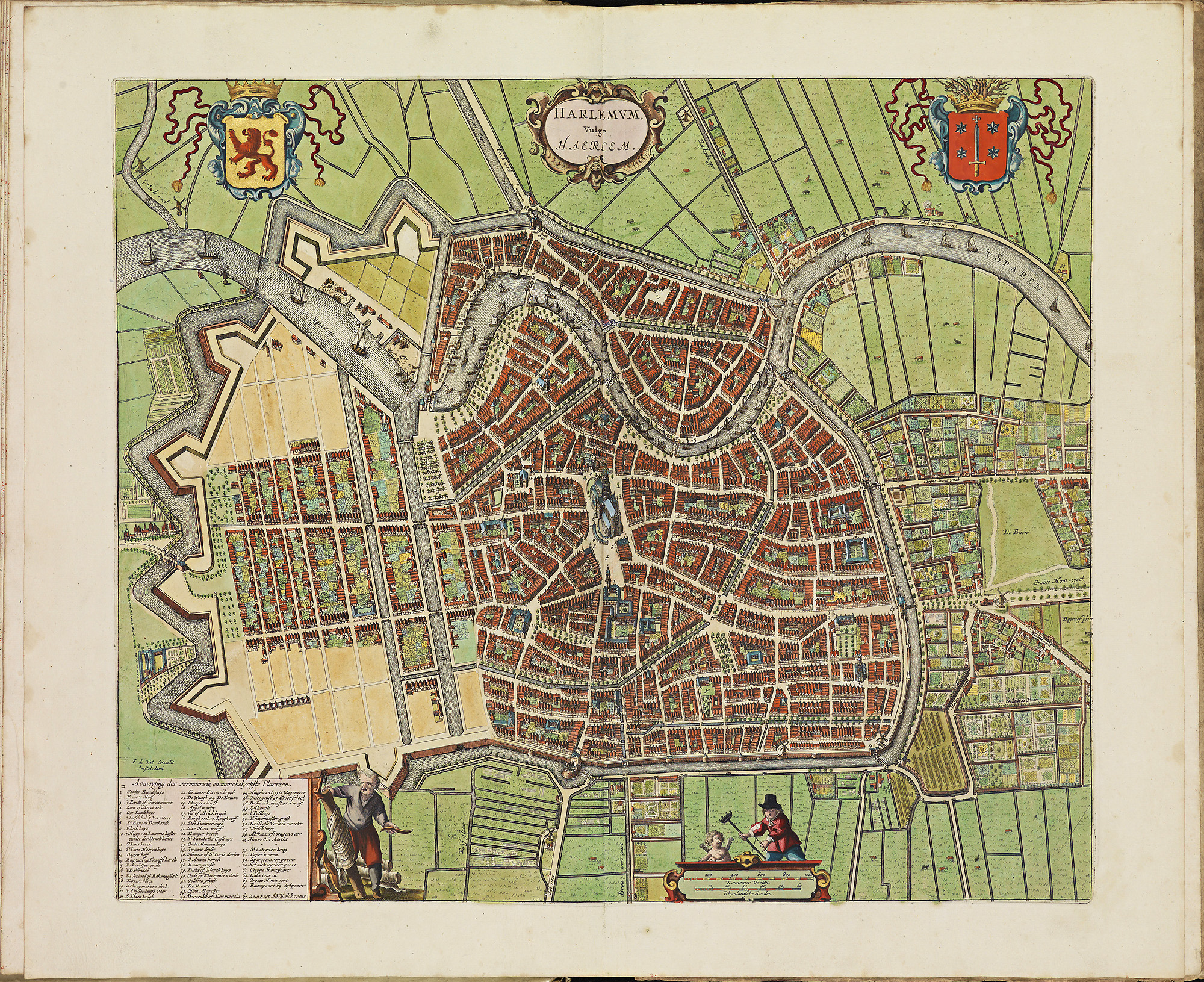
Map from 1698

Hobbyists love to look at older Haarlem cityscapes and pick out features such as steeples and boats. For paintings traditionally called Haerlempjes, such features have been proven to be based more on historical accuracy rather than artist fantasy. Though fantasy cityscapes were popular in the Netherlands throughout the 17th-century, these seem to be more often pastiches of southern harbours or italianate landscapes, rather than places that artists had conceivably visited. Today, for example, it is assumed that Jacob van Ruisdael worked in Bentheim because he painted many accurate views of the castle there. However, he often painted such castle views situated in a fantasy landscape on a mountain top, though the castle is in fact situated in low rolling countryside. In Haarlem, though he painted many dunescapes of the Kennemerland area, he never turned those dunes into mountains.

== Early views of Haerlem ==
Most travellers visiting Haarlem in the middle of the 17th-century were on their way from The Hague to Amsterdam and saw the city from the Spaarne river, as most intercity travel was by trekschuit or sailing ship. Thus many early cityscapes are taken from the point of view of the river traveller.

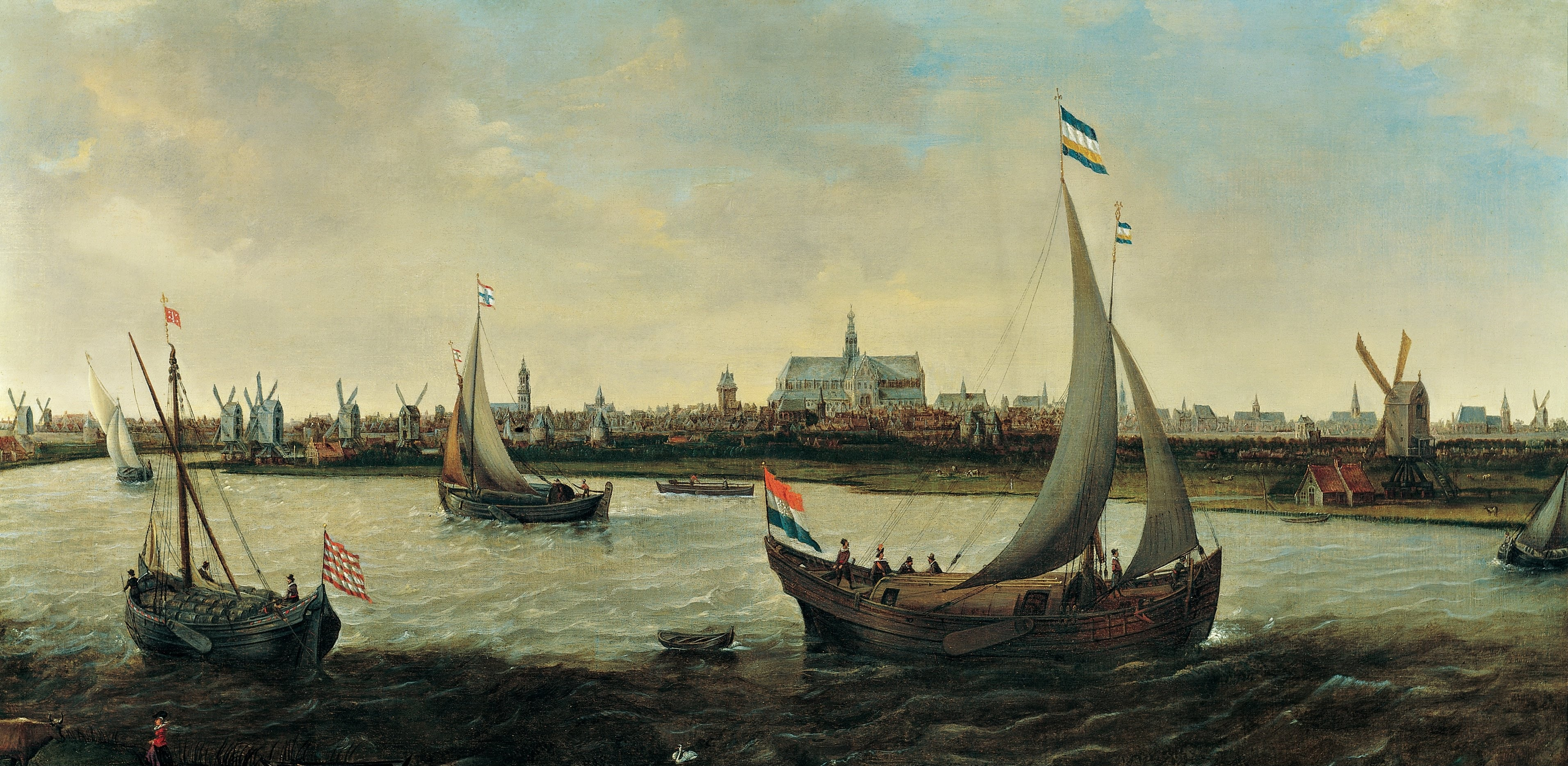
Hendrik Cornelisz Vroom, c.1625

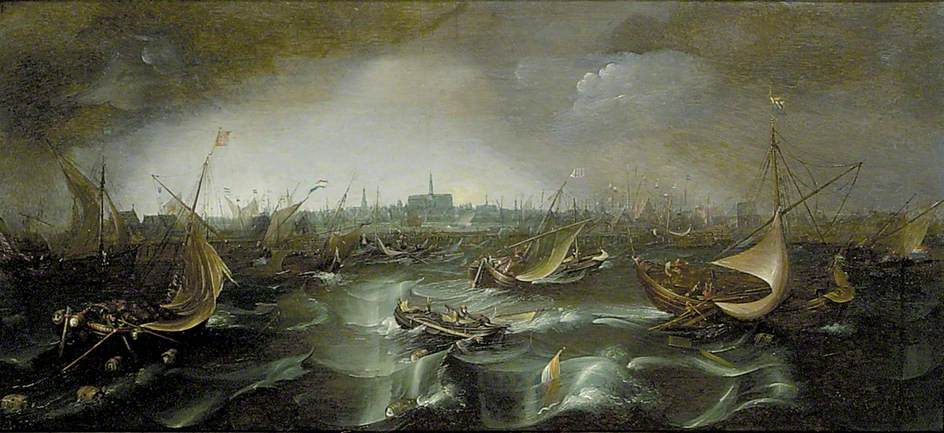
Cornelis Claesz van Wieringen, 1620s

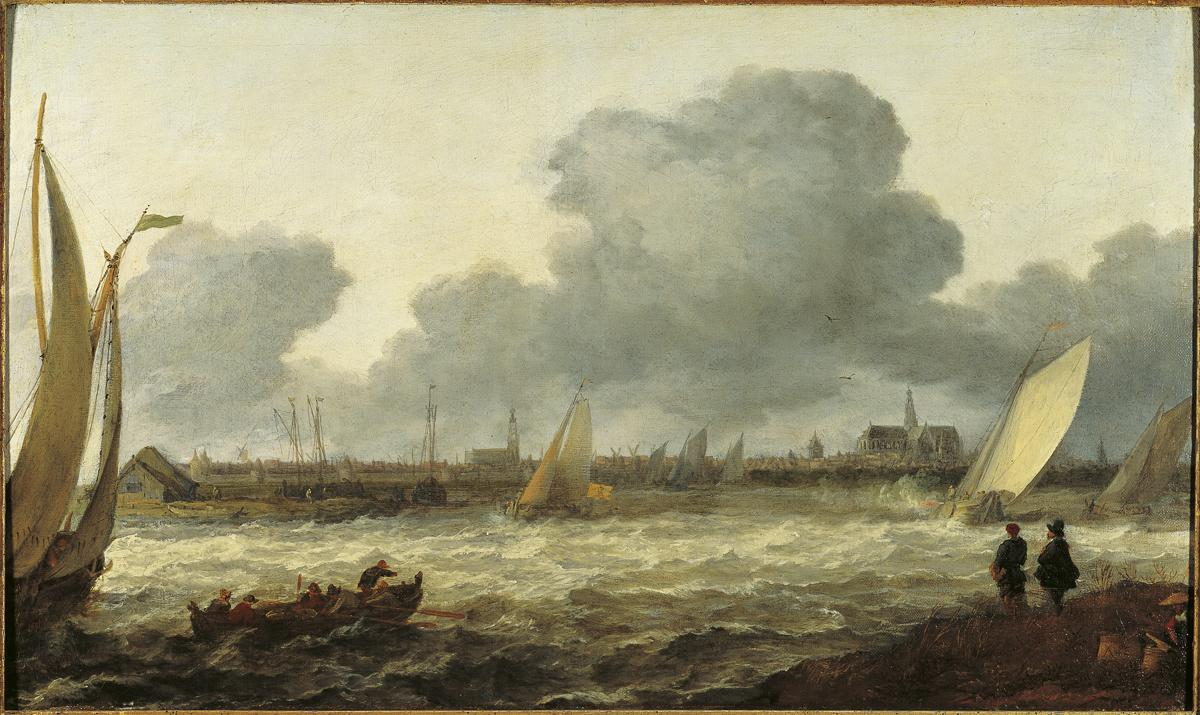
Allaert van Everdingen, 1640s?

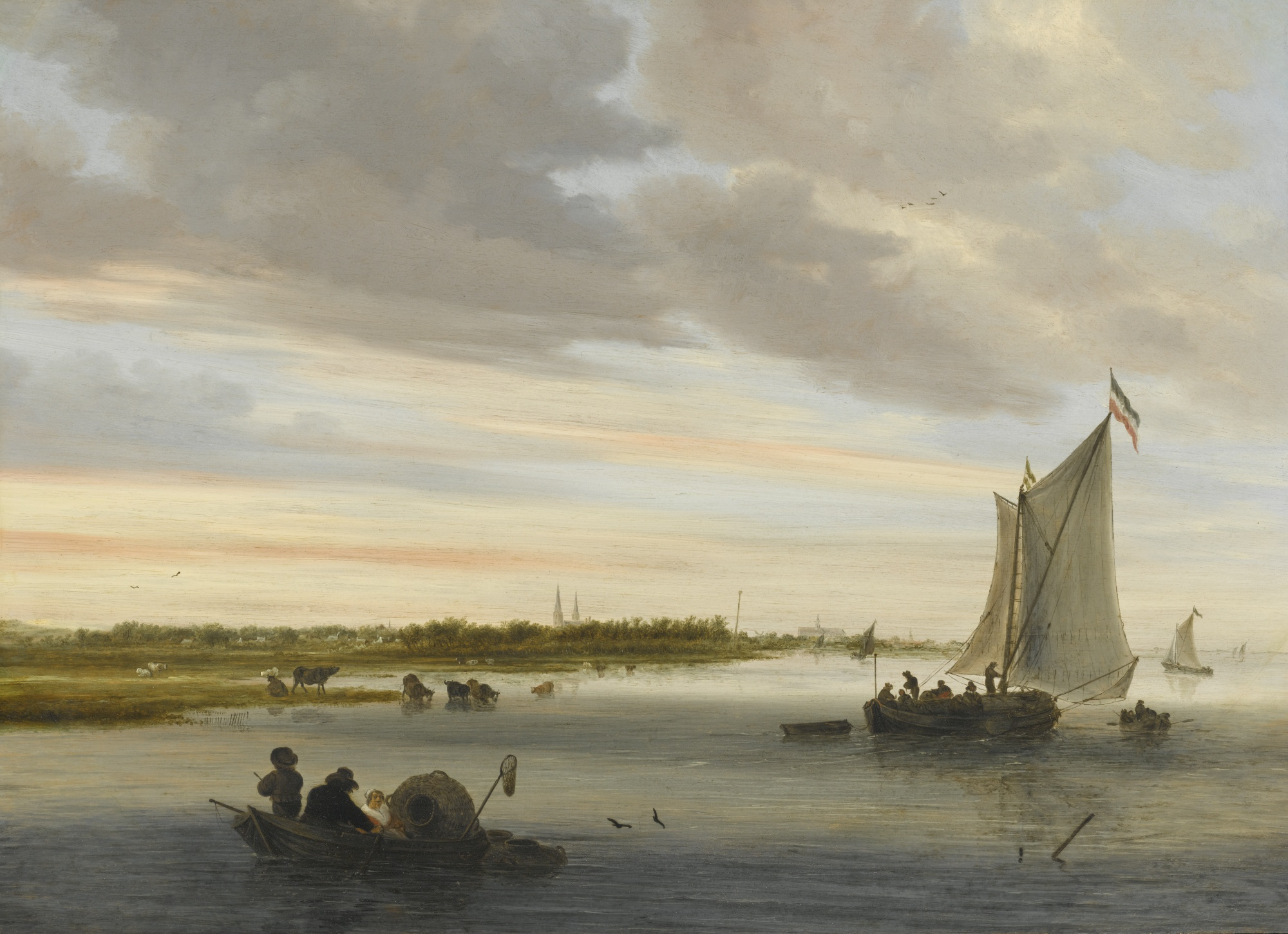
Salomon van Ruysdael, 1647

== Dunescapes ==
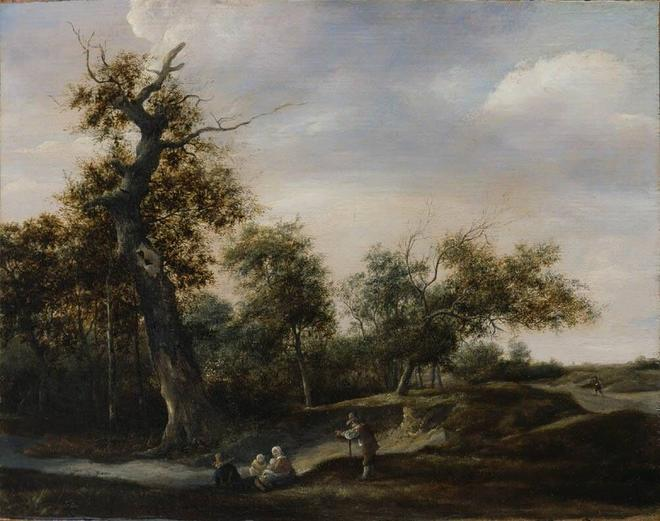
Even the genre painter Jan Steen produced some dune landscapes in Haarlem in the 1640s, though it is unknown whether he painted any Haerlempjes

The popularity of such river-based cityscapes were offset by another type of landscape with dunes or windmills that included a Haarlem cityscape on the horizon.

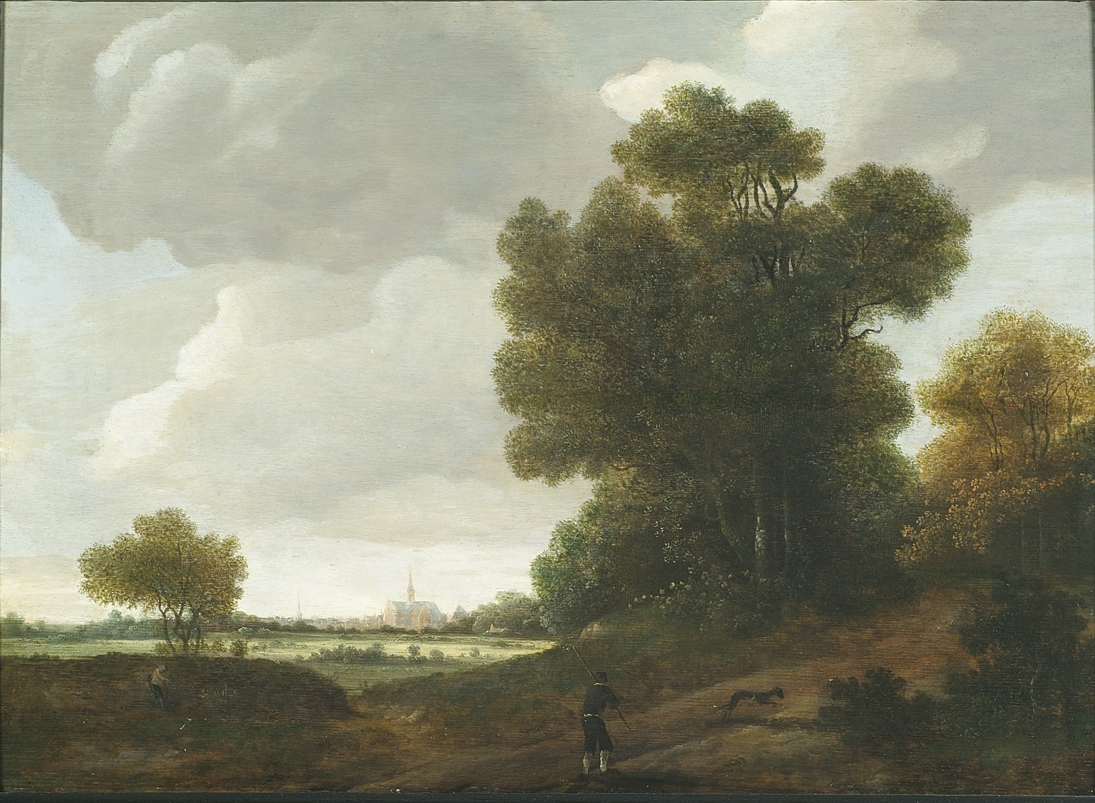
Jan Wils 1644

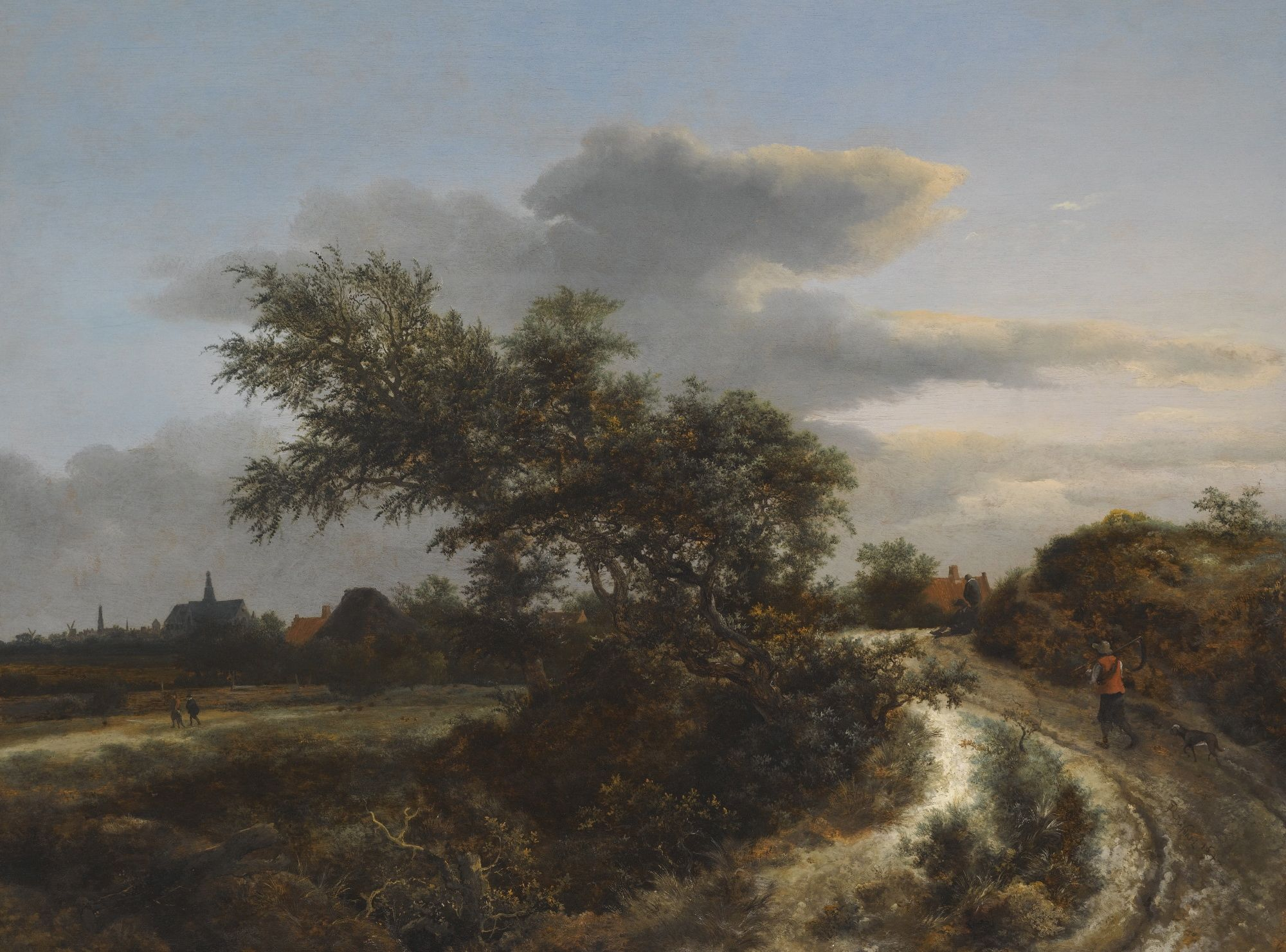
Jacob van Ruisdael, 1647

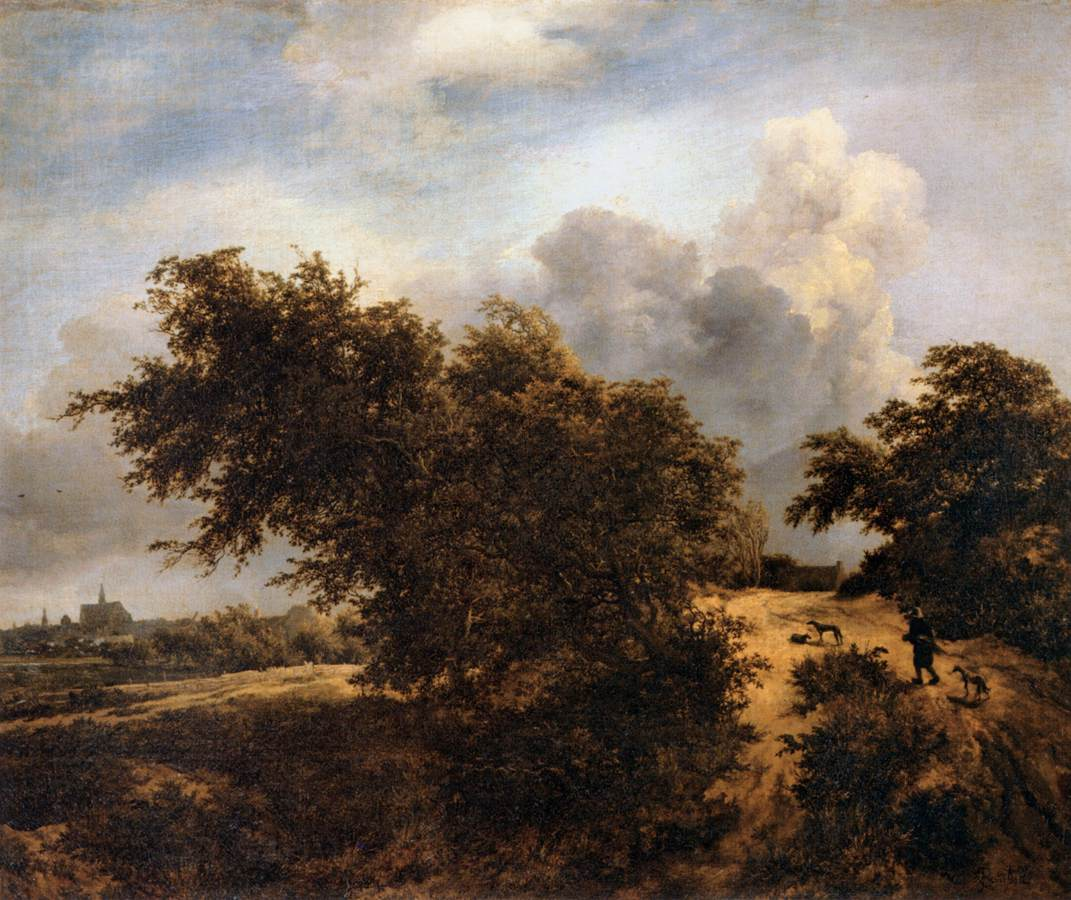
Jacob van Ruisdael, c.1649

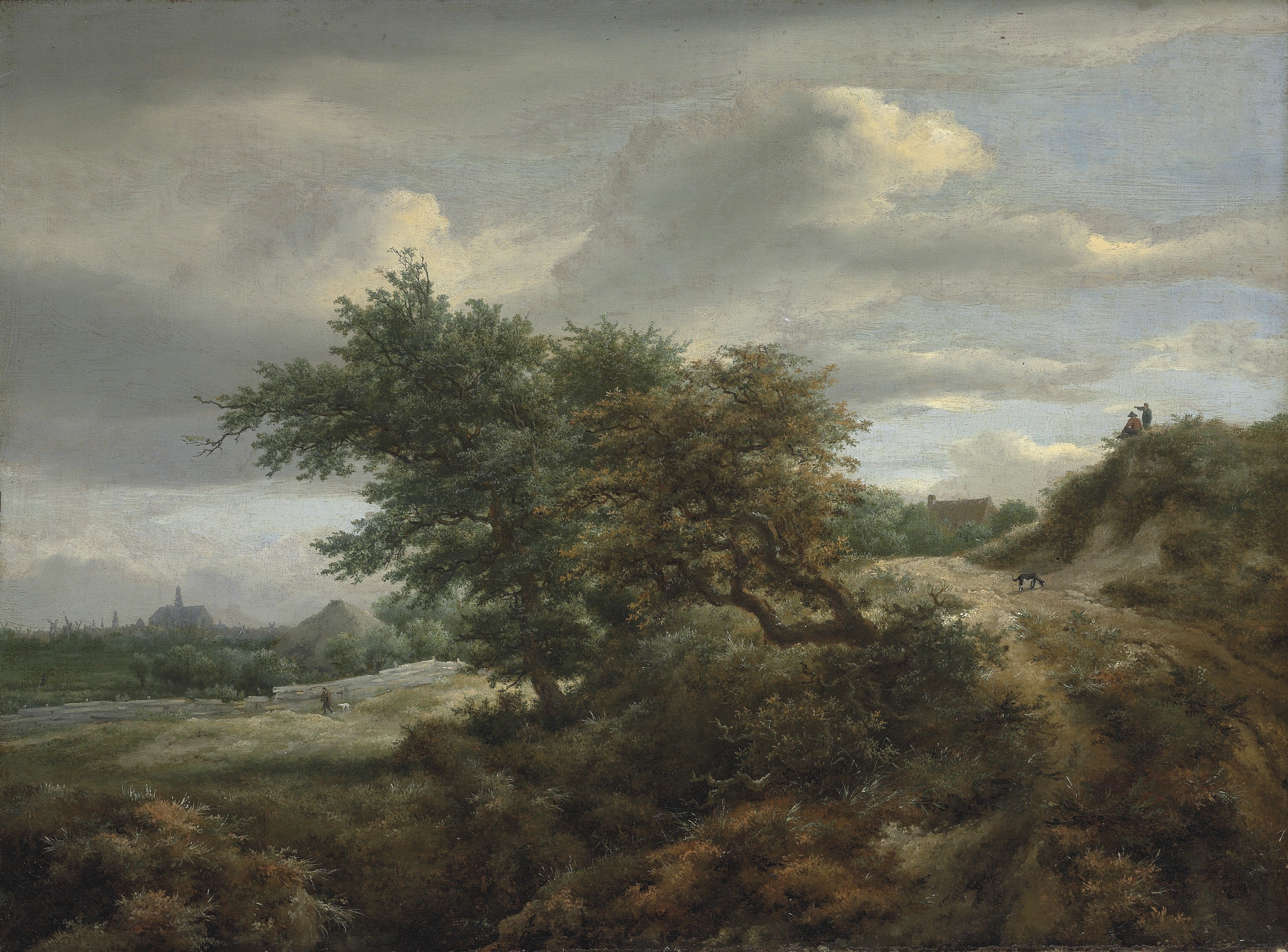
Jacob van Ruisdael, 1650s

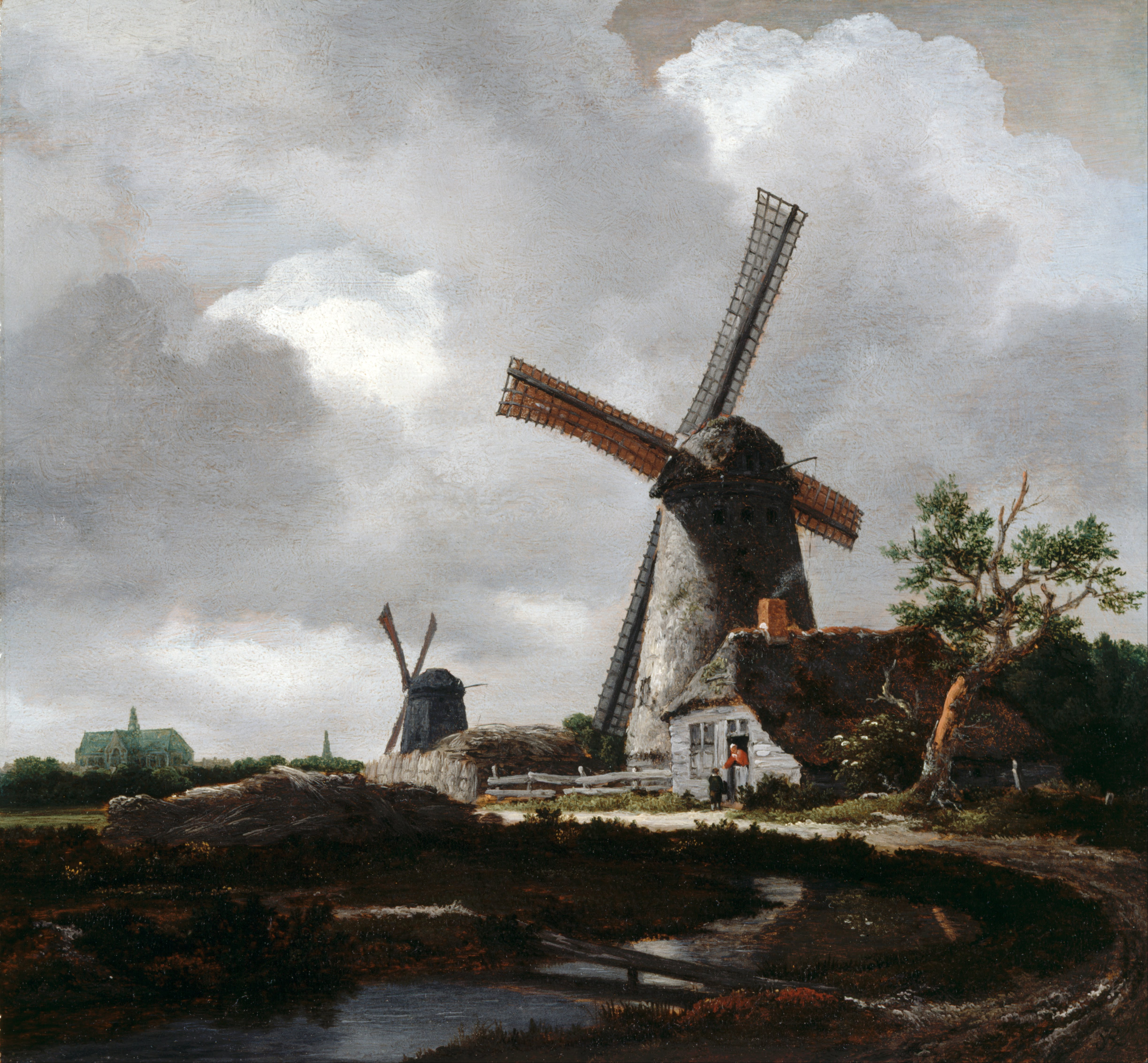
Jacob van Ruisdael, 1651

== Panoramas of Haerlem ==
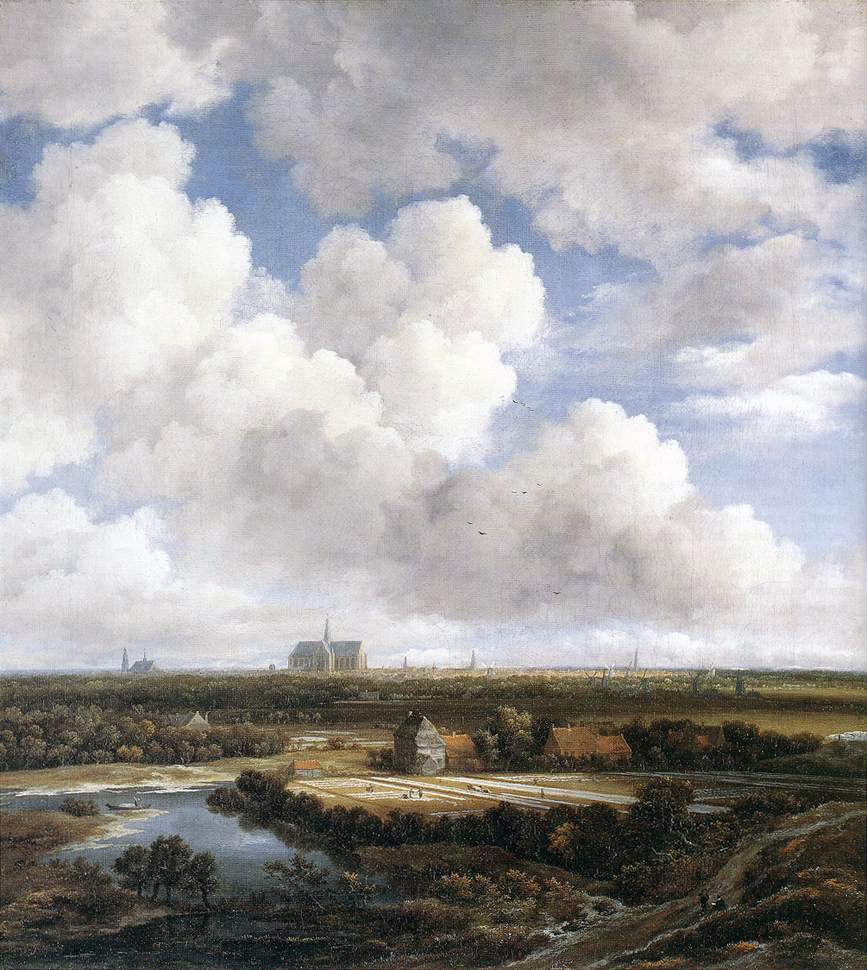
View of Haarlem with Bleaching Fields, viewpoint somewhat higher in the air than the highest point of Het Kopje, by Jacob van Ruisdael, c.1665

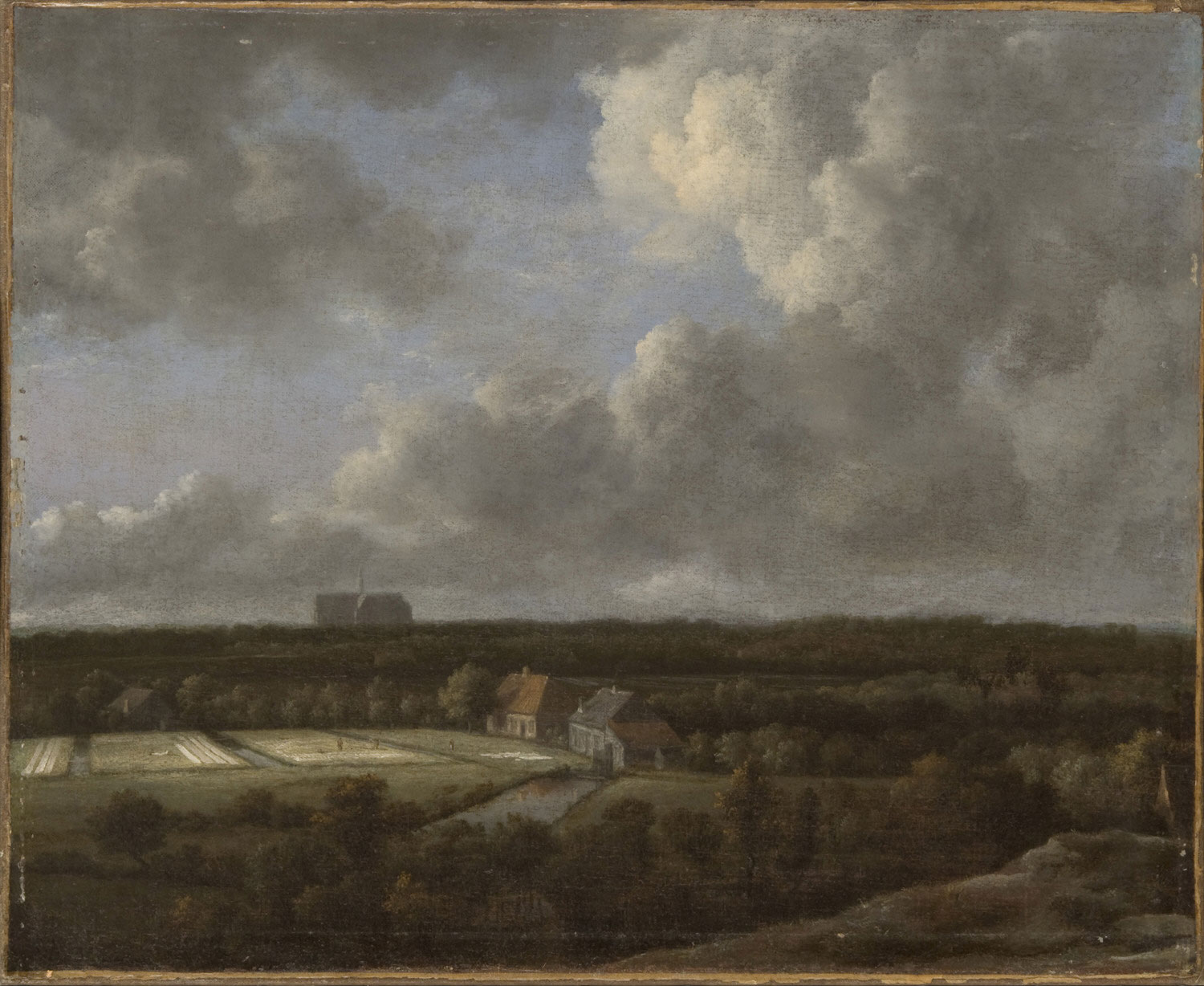
So-called Bleaching Fields to the North-Northeast of Haarlem, actually showing bleaching fields in Heemstede to the south of Haarlem, by Jacob van Ruisdael, 1670s

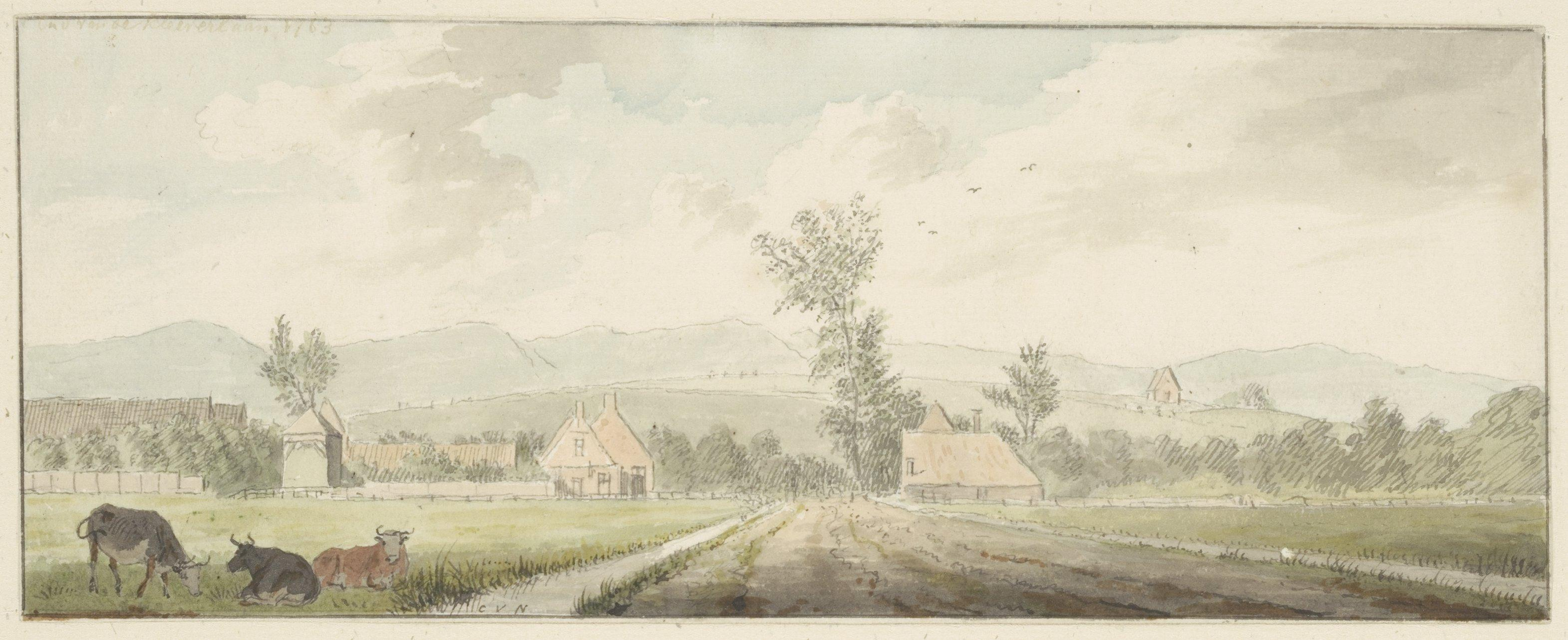
This watercolor from 1763 by Cornelis van Noorde shows how high the dunes of Bloemendaal used to be. This is a view of the Kleverlaan from the perspective of the Huis ter Kleef. "Clercq and Beeck", still owned by the De Clercq family a century later, is here on the left.

It wasn't until the 1650s that the production of the panoramic views began that were later copied by others. Perhaps the most famous is Ruisdael's view of Haarlem bleaching fields from the north-east, which is why many assumed that all Haerlempjes were painted from the same perspective, not realizing that the entire area is relatively flat and so they were painted from an imaginary point somewhere up in the air, and not from a mountaintop. There is a high dune in Bloemendaal called Het Kopje and there used to be a ridge of high dunes in Heemstede that were later slowly removed by sand-barges for use in building foundations for the mansions in the Amsterdam expansion known today as the Canals of Amsterdam. On older maps, the Sant-vaert is clearly marked where such barges once travelled. That canal still exists today and forms the modern border between Haarlem and Heemstede, and is called the Crayenestervaart.

In 1997 Pieter Biesboer wrote a short article explaining the viewpoints of some of these paintings based on old maps, most notably the Bleaching Fields to the North-Northeast of Haarlem in the collection of the Philadelphia Museum of Art. This painting, despite its title, does not show Haarlem from the north at all, but shows Haarlem from the south, from an imaginary point somewhere above the old dune ridge near the street known as the Blekersvaart in Heemstede, probably close to the Dorstige Kuil, an inn favored by artists in the 17th century. The church in the painting clearly shows the curved side of the choir on the right rather than the left. Biesboer noticed also that this painting displays many more trees, which is logical because the park Haarlemmerhout is situated there.

In the same article a few other paintings are mentioned, including a Ruisdael view of Haarlem bleaching fields in the collection of the Montreal Museum of Fine Arts, which shows the ruins of Huis ter Kleef, also shown from the same perspective in a painting in the musée Jacquemart-André. He was able to trace the bleachery Clercq and Beeck situated on the Kleverlaan shown in the right foreground in this painting to one owned by Lucas de Clercq, whose portrait was painted by Frans Hals. This scene of Clercq and Beeck was painted again by Ruisdael with some more detail in the version located in the Mauritshuis.

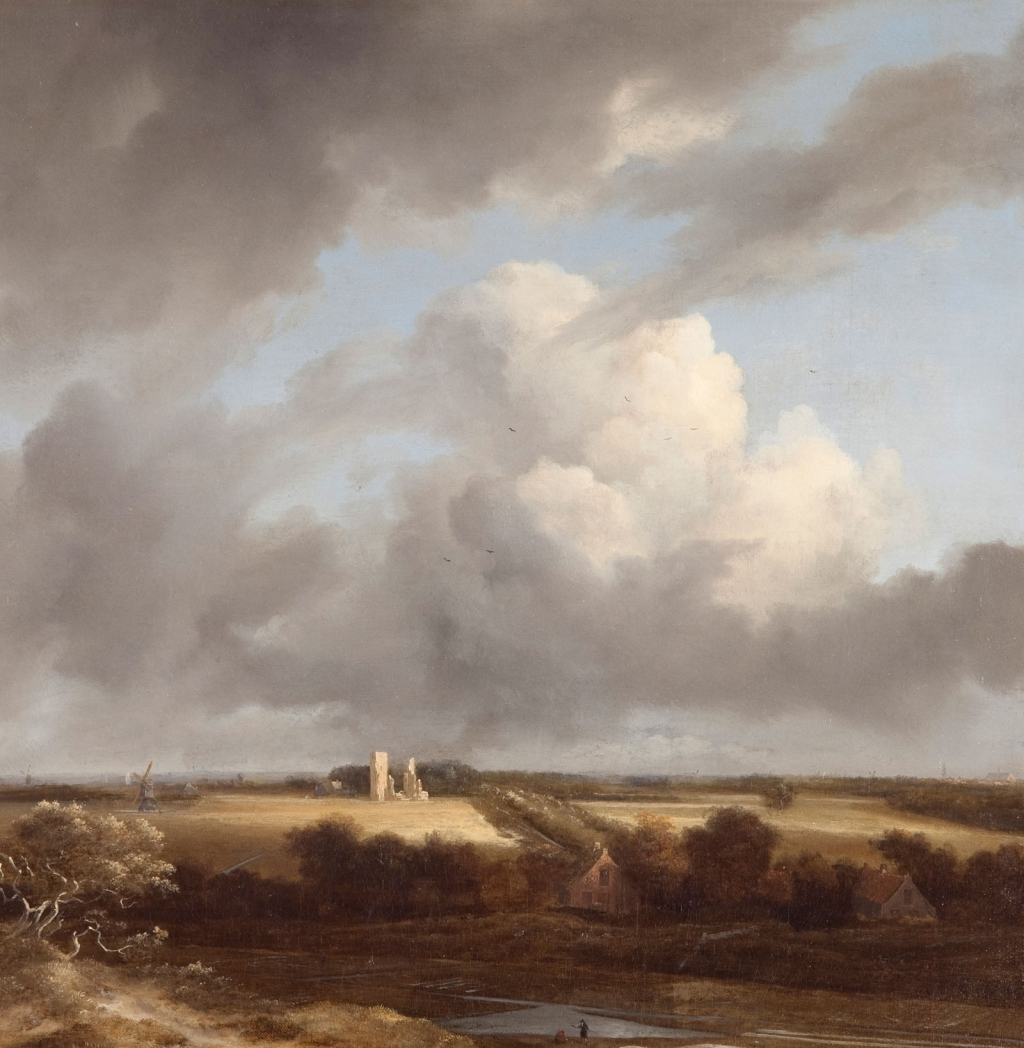
Huis ter Kleef with the Kleverlaan represented by the double row of trees, Jacob van Ruisdael, 1660s

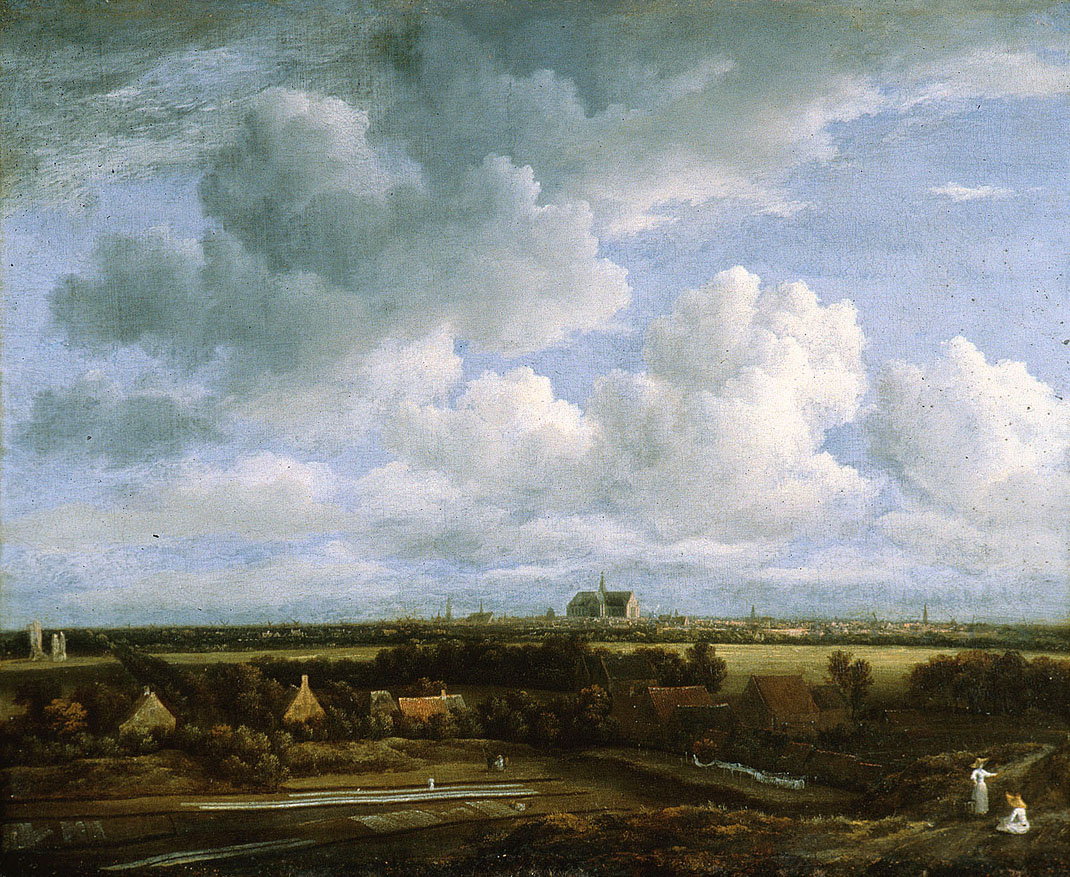
Montreal version: Bleachery to the north of Clercq and Beeck from the same perspective, by Jacob van Ruisdael, c. 1670

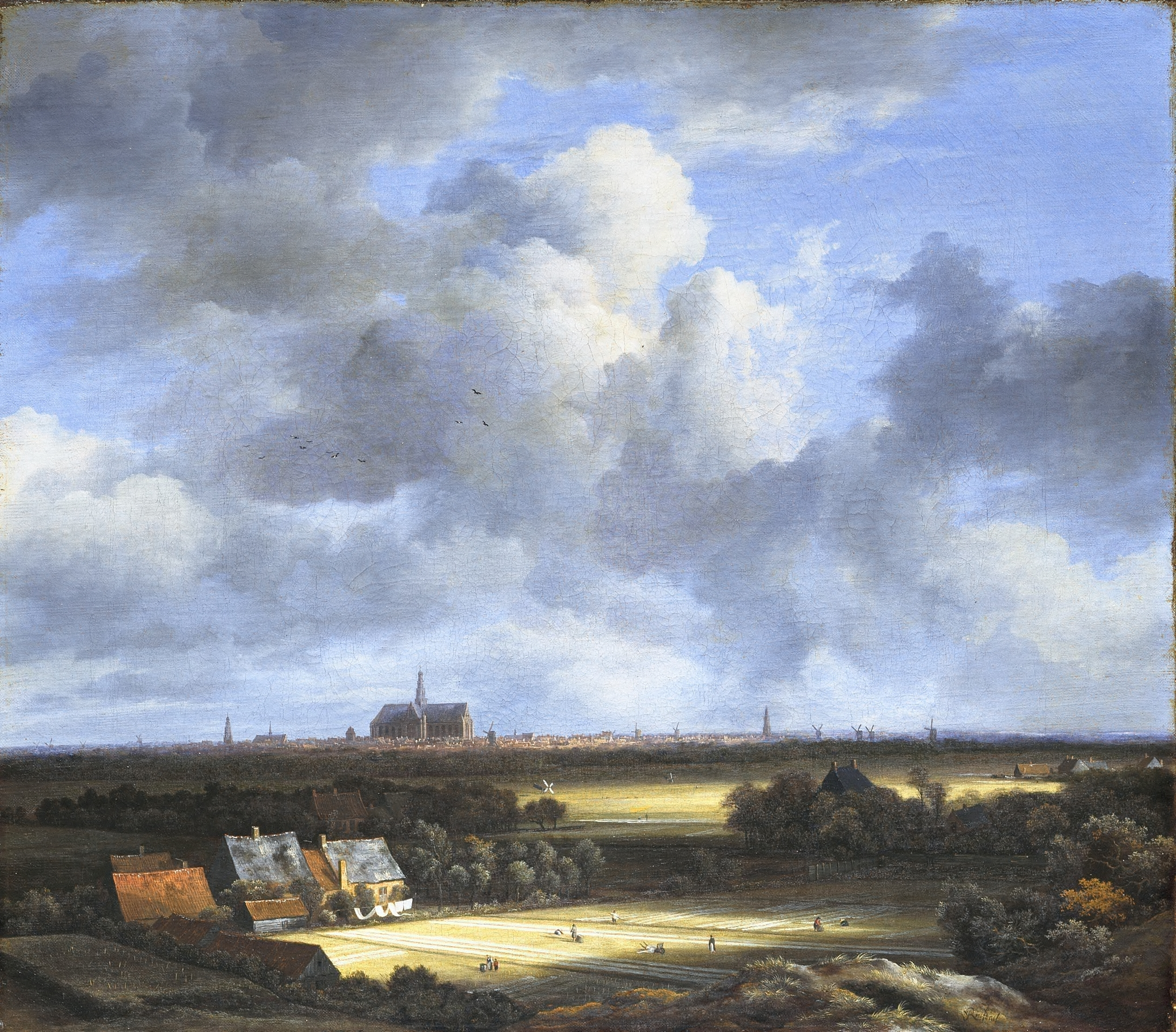
Mauritshuis version: Clercq and Beeck a bit further south, by Jacob van Ruisdael, c. 1670

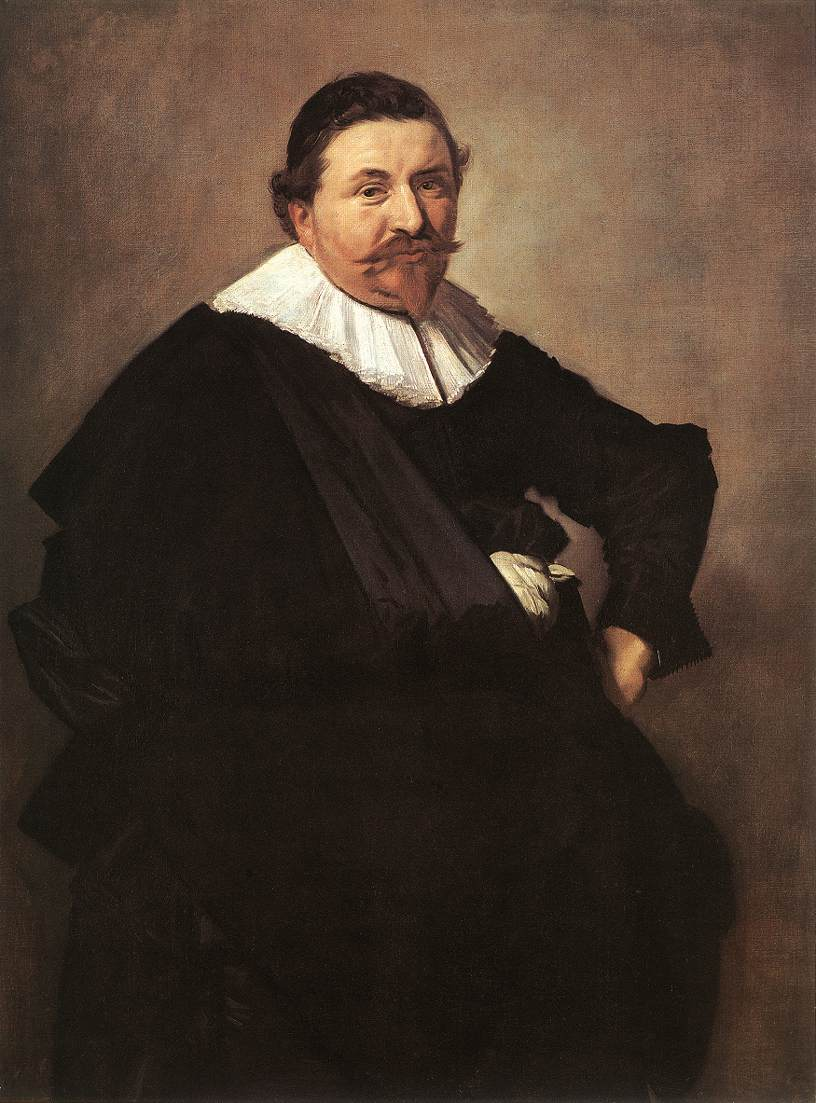
Lucas de Clercq, owner of the bleachery Clercq and Beeck

The painting from the Mauritshuis is the same view of Beeck and Clercq as the painting in the Rijksmuseum, while the one in the Gemäldegalerie of the same general view seems between those and the one in Montreal:

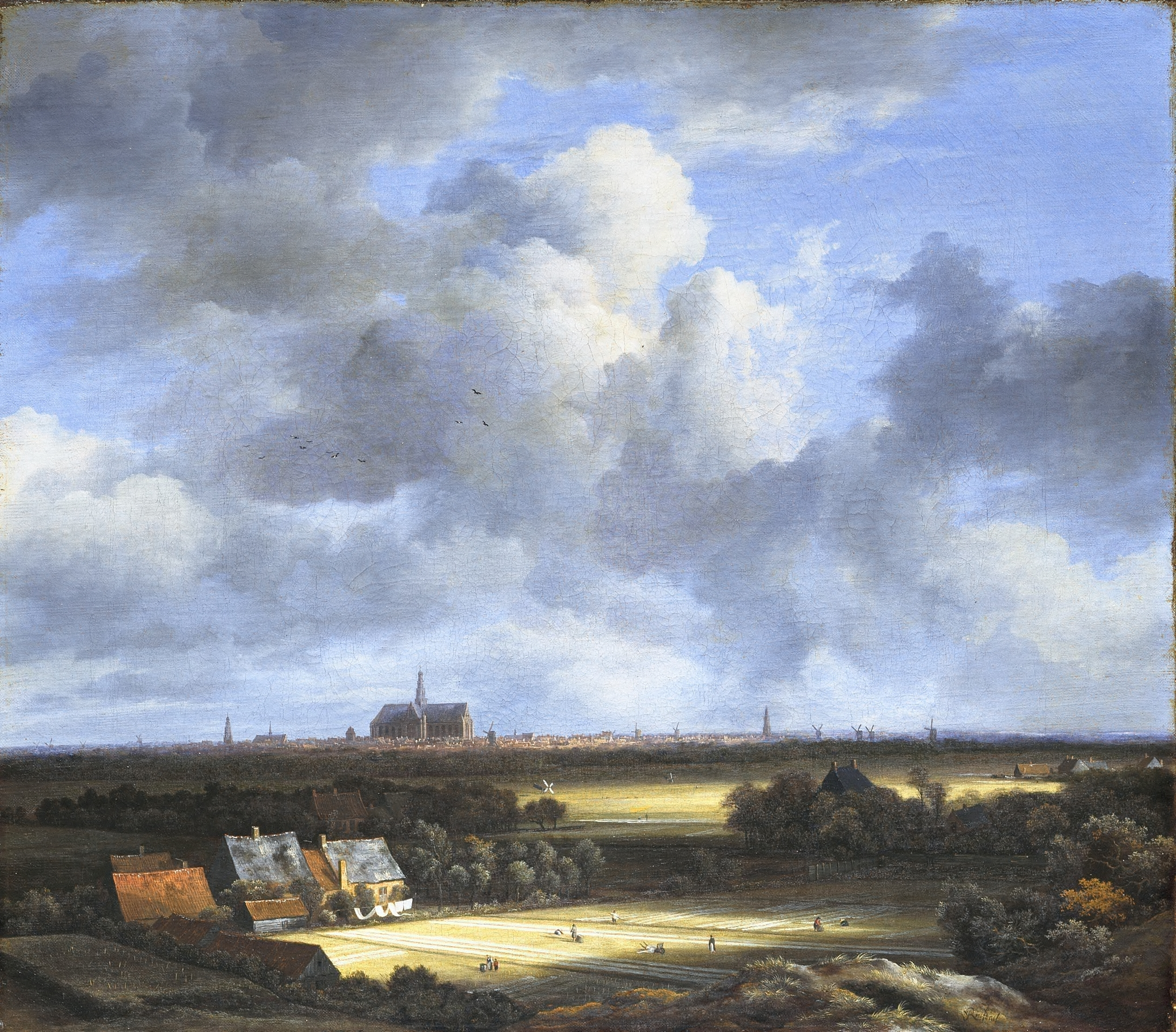
Mauritshuis version: Clercq and Beeck a bit further south, by Jacob van Ruisdael, c. 1670

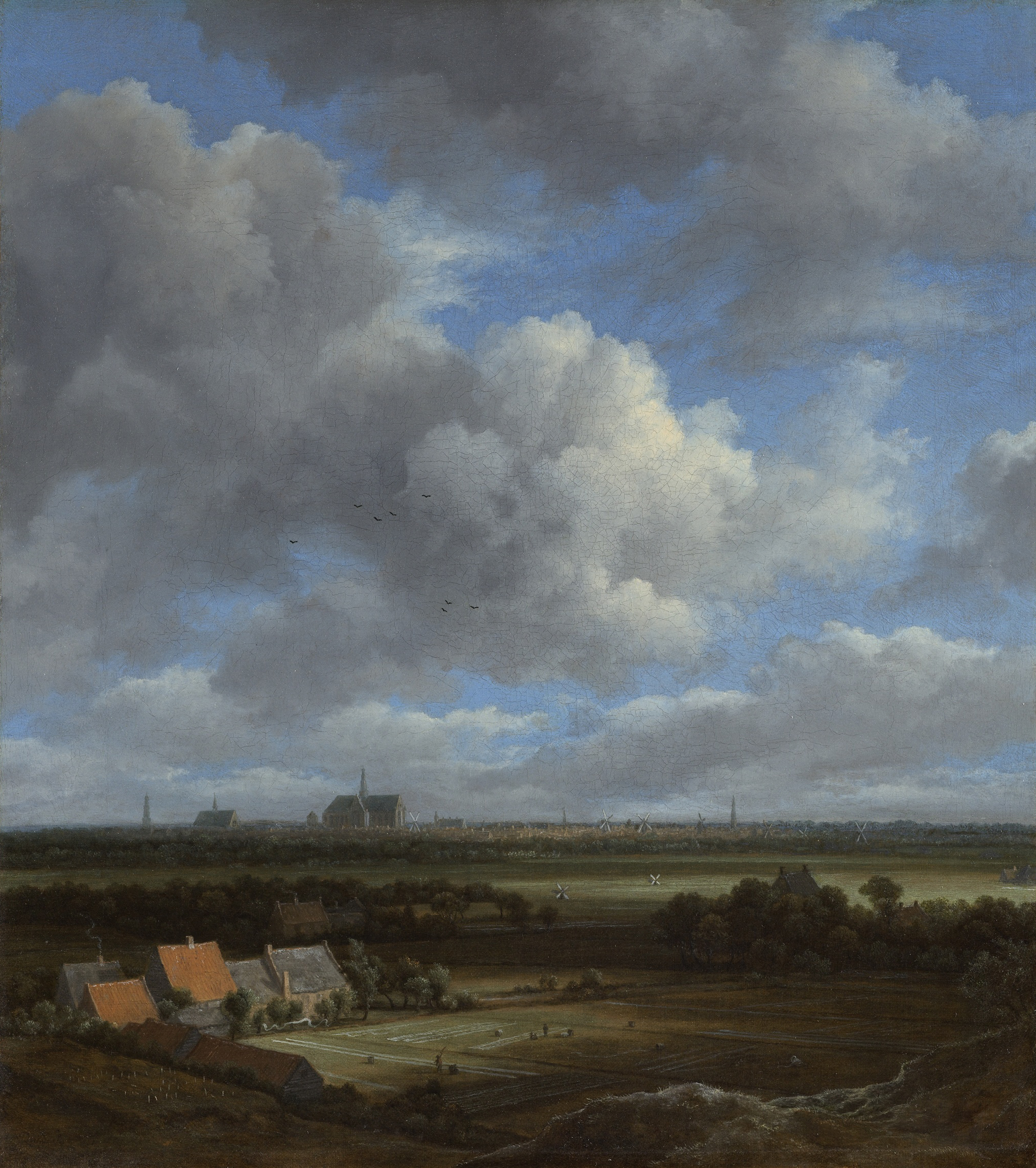
Rijksmuseum version, Jacob van Ruisdael, after 1650

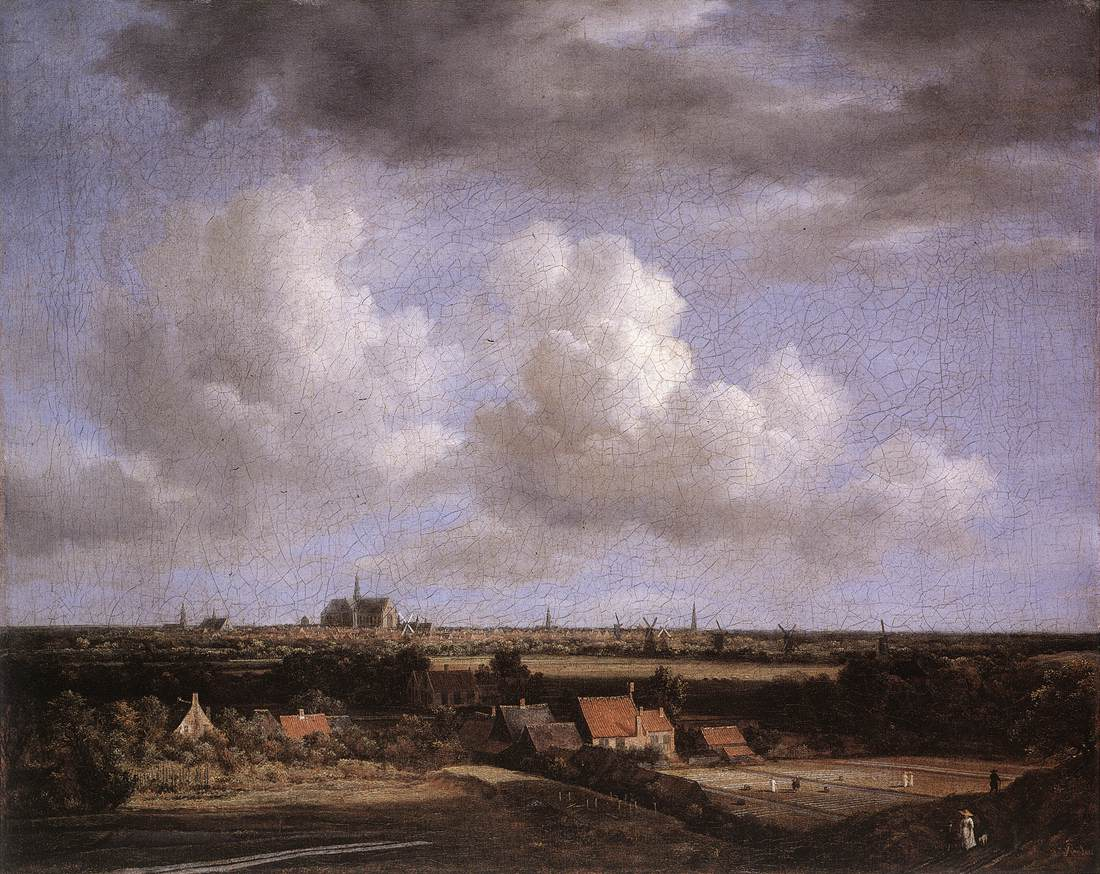
Berlin version, Jacob van Ruisdael, 1670–75

The painting from the Philadelphia Museum is the same view from Heemstede as the painting in the Timken Museum of Art:

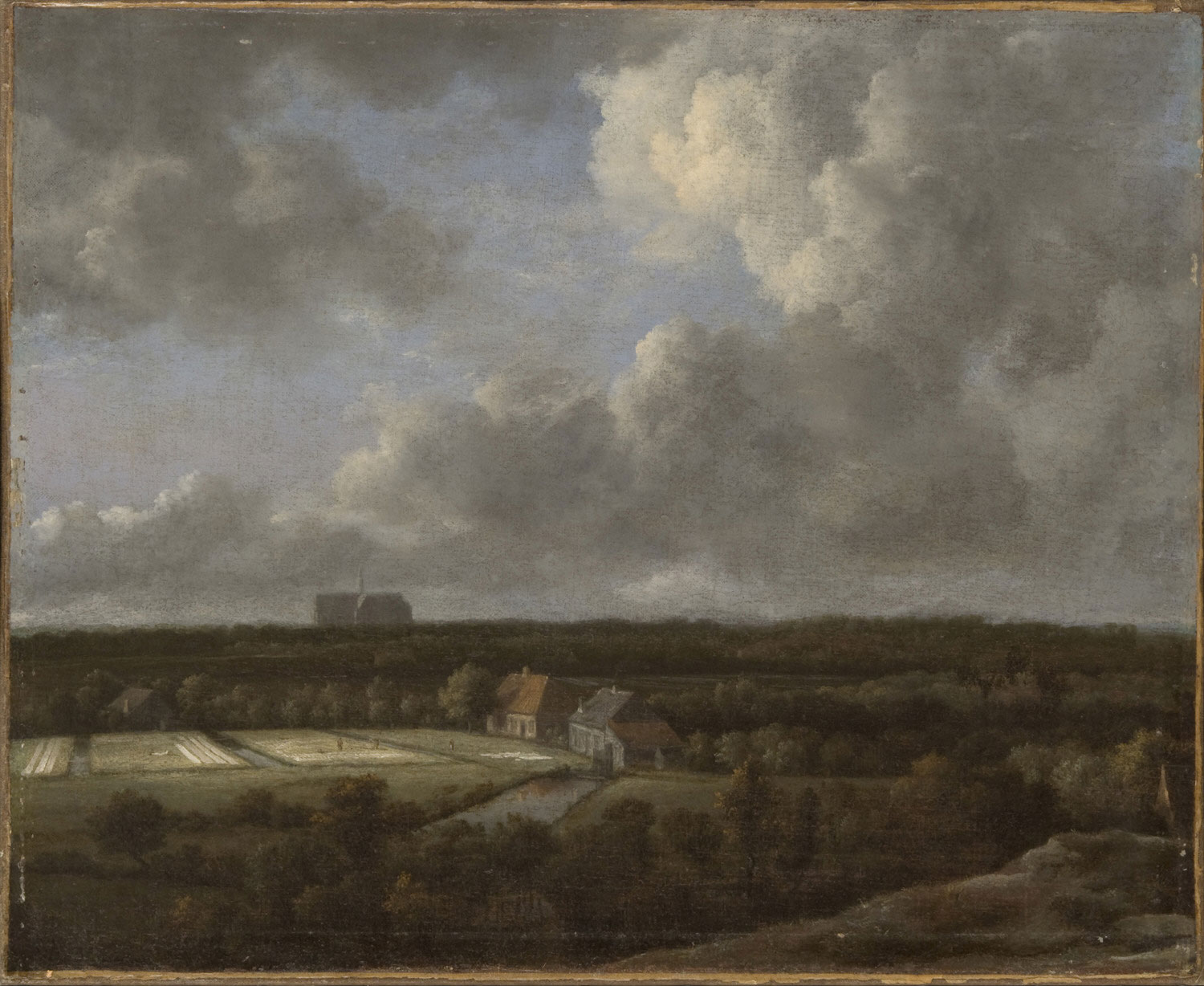
Jacob van Ruisdael, c. 1670

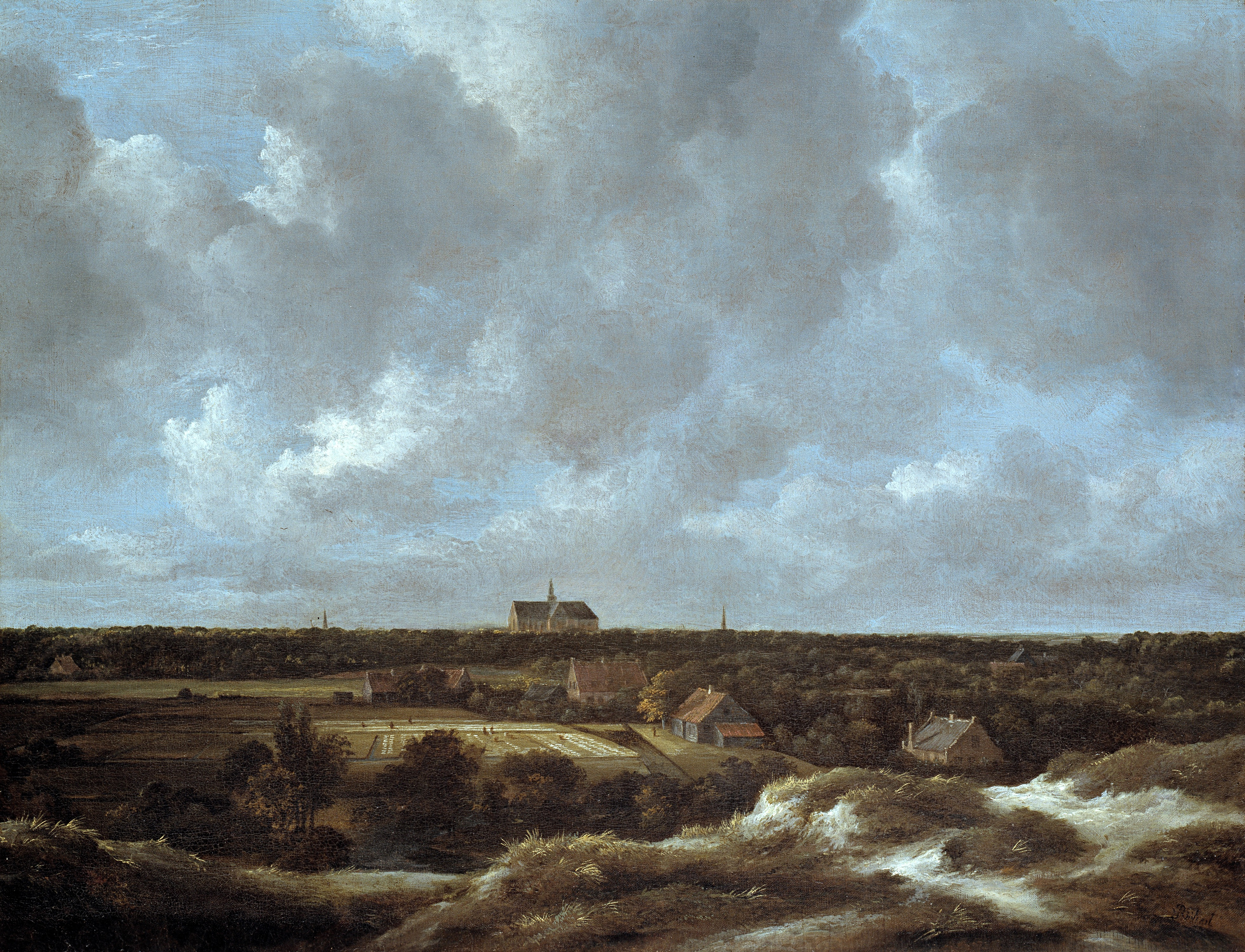
Jacob van Ruisdael, c. 1665-70

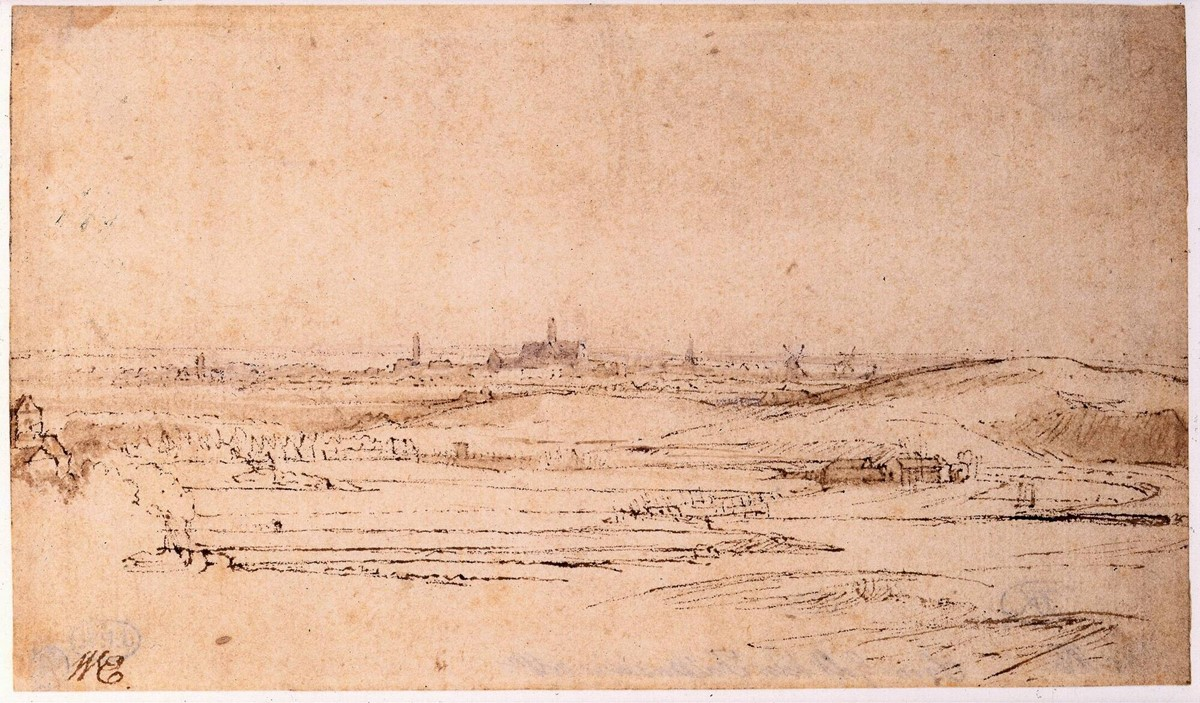
The Goldweigher's Field, by Rembrandt, 1650-1651

Though not all of these panoramic paintings show bleachfields, these bleacheries were often also mentioned on maps, and served as easy points of orientation for those looking down on the landscape from high dunes. Possibly some of these paintings were commissioned by the bleacheries themselves for use in Haarlem shops where goods were sold and exchanged. Lucas de Clercq lived in Haarlem during the winter and on his Clercq and Beeck estate in the summer months. Even Rembrandt made a sketch of bleaching fields, though these were only identified as such a few centuries after the fact.

The Haerlempjes seemed to become popular not only in Haarlem, but were sold everywhere, and even various books were produced containing prints of such views of Haarlem by the Roghman family and others.

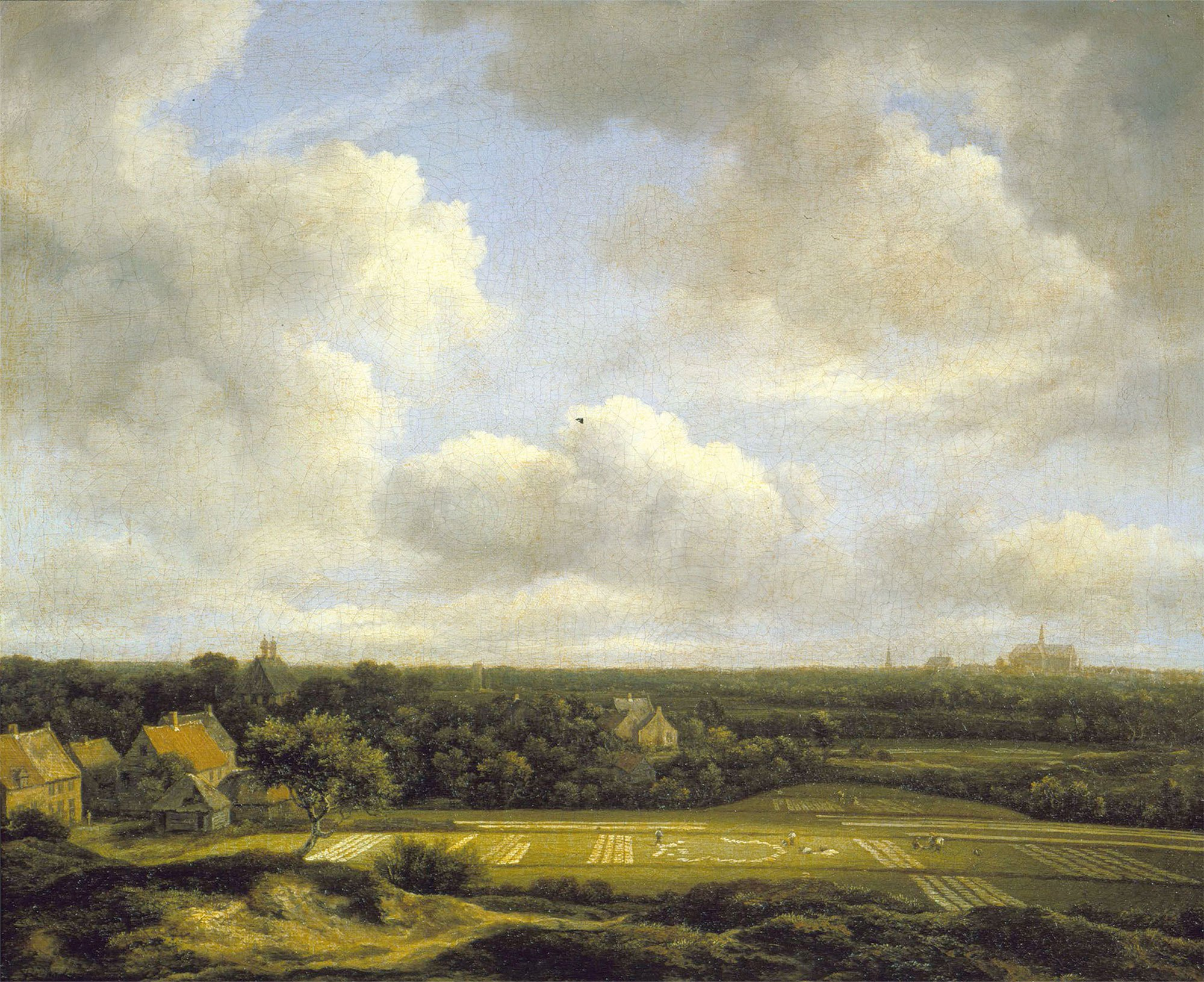
Jacob van Ruisdael, 1660s

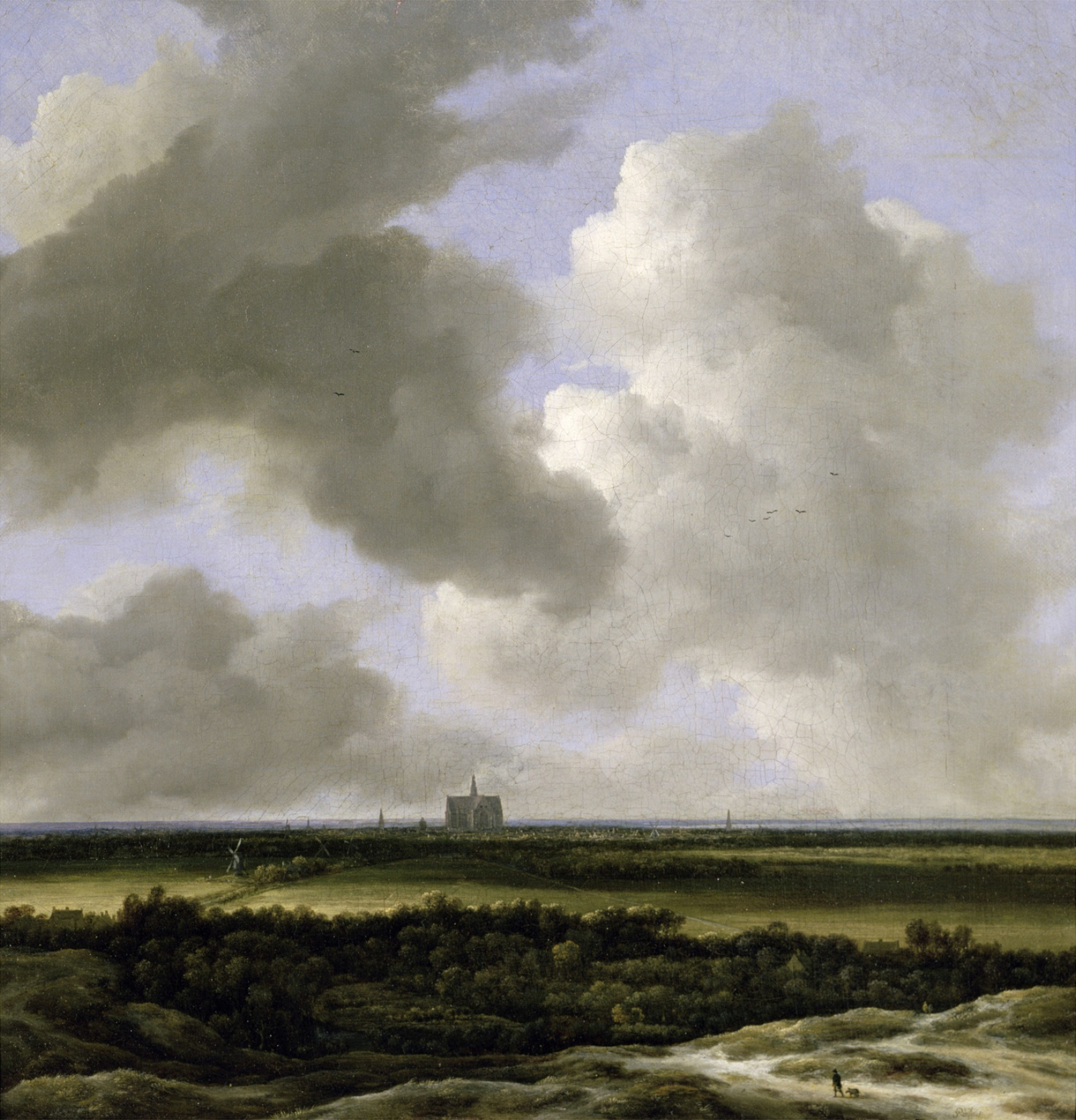
Jacob van Ruisdael, 1670

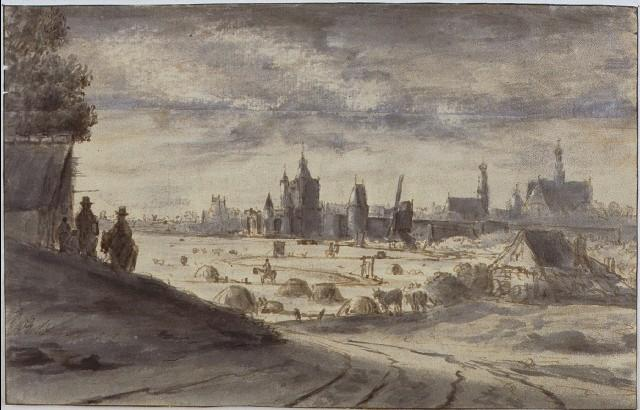
Roelant Roghman, c.1660

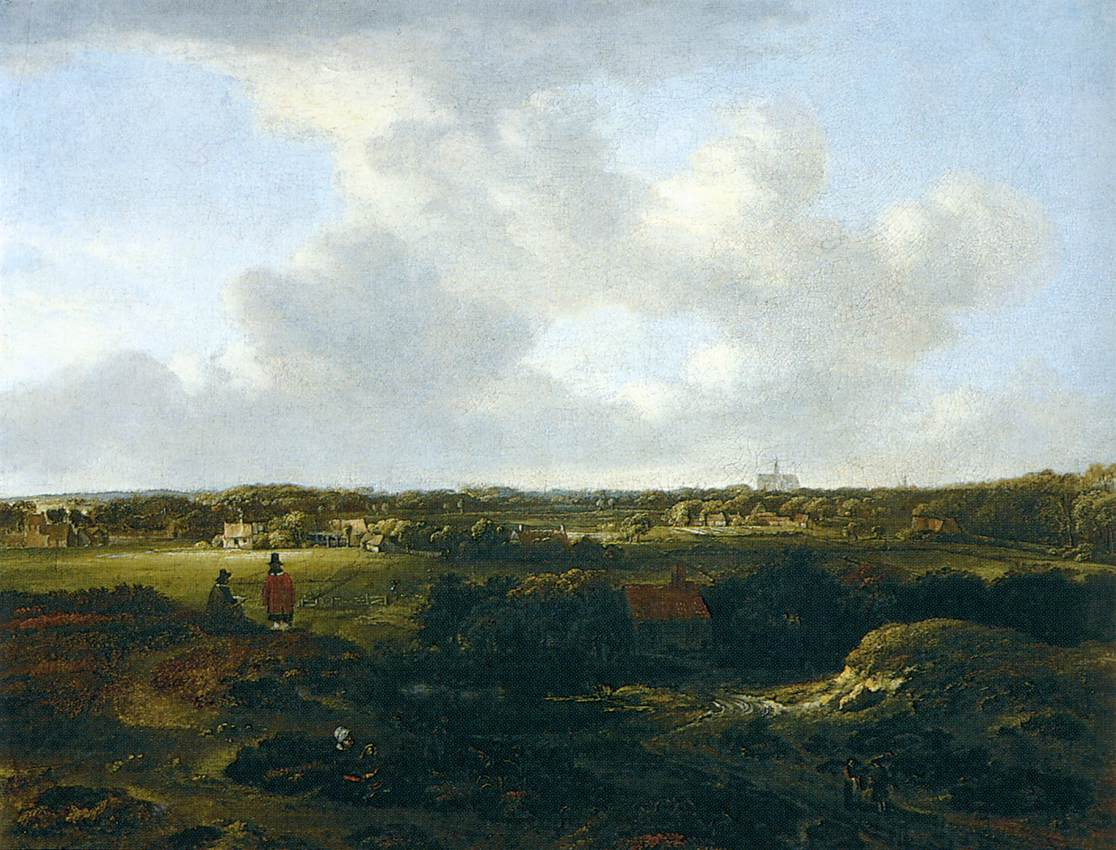
Jan Vermeer van Haarlem the Elder, 1660s

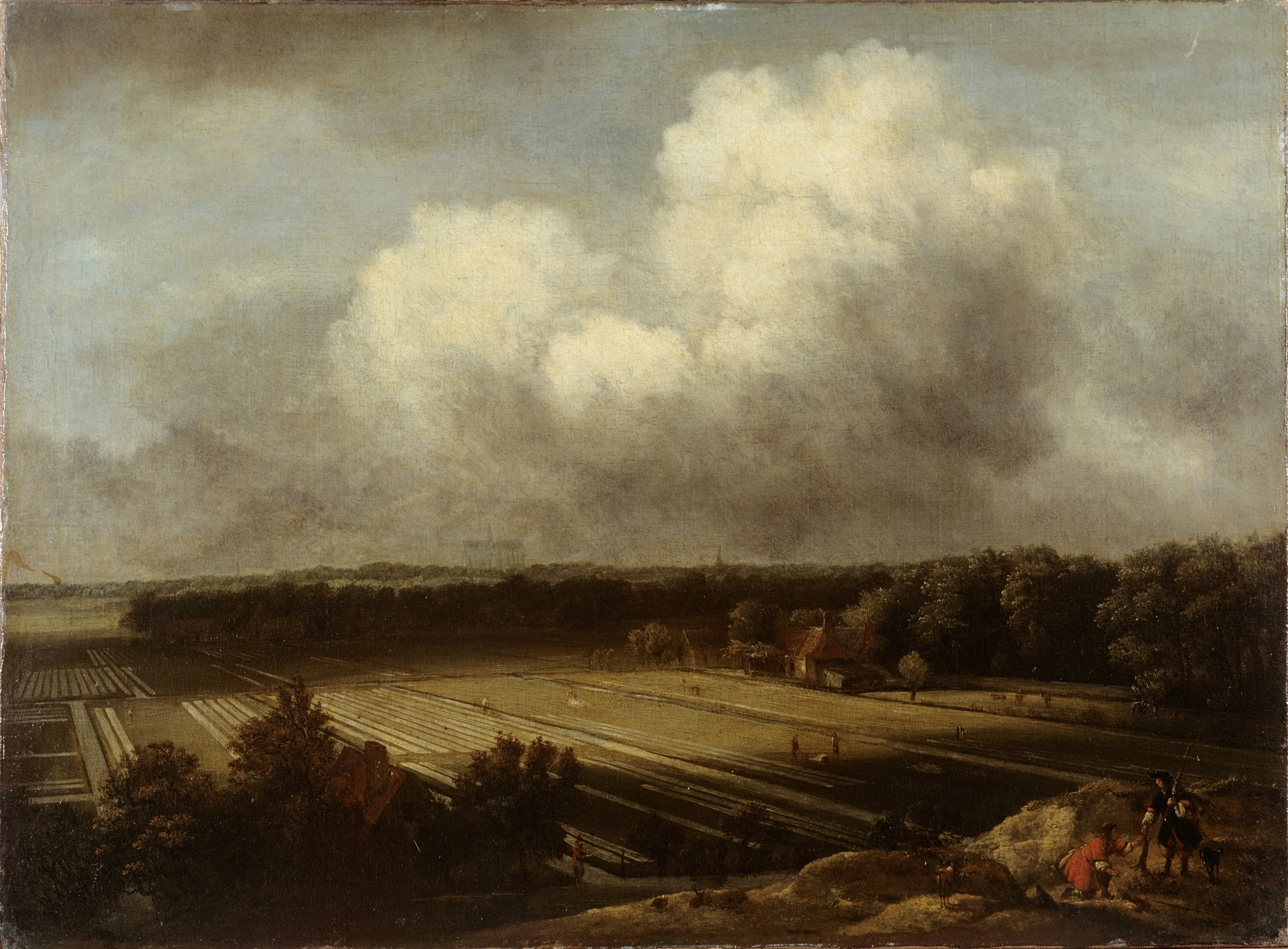
Jan van Kessel, 1670s

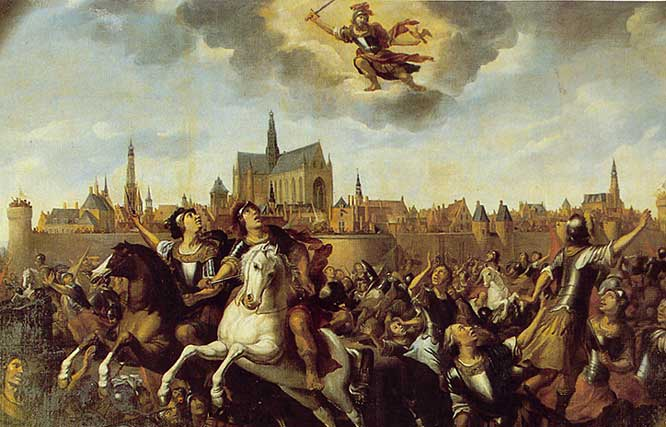
Reyer van Blommendael, 1673

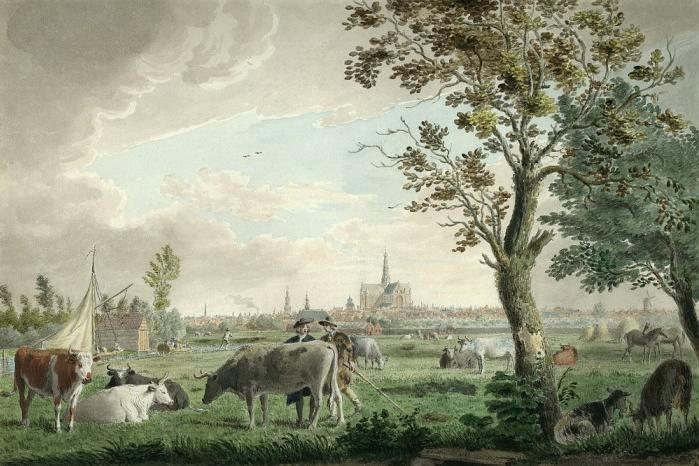
Cornelis van Noorde, 1767

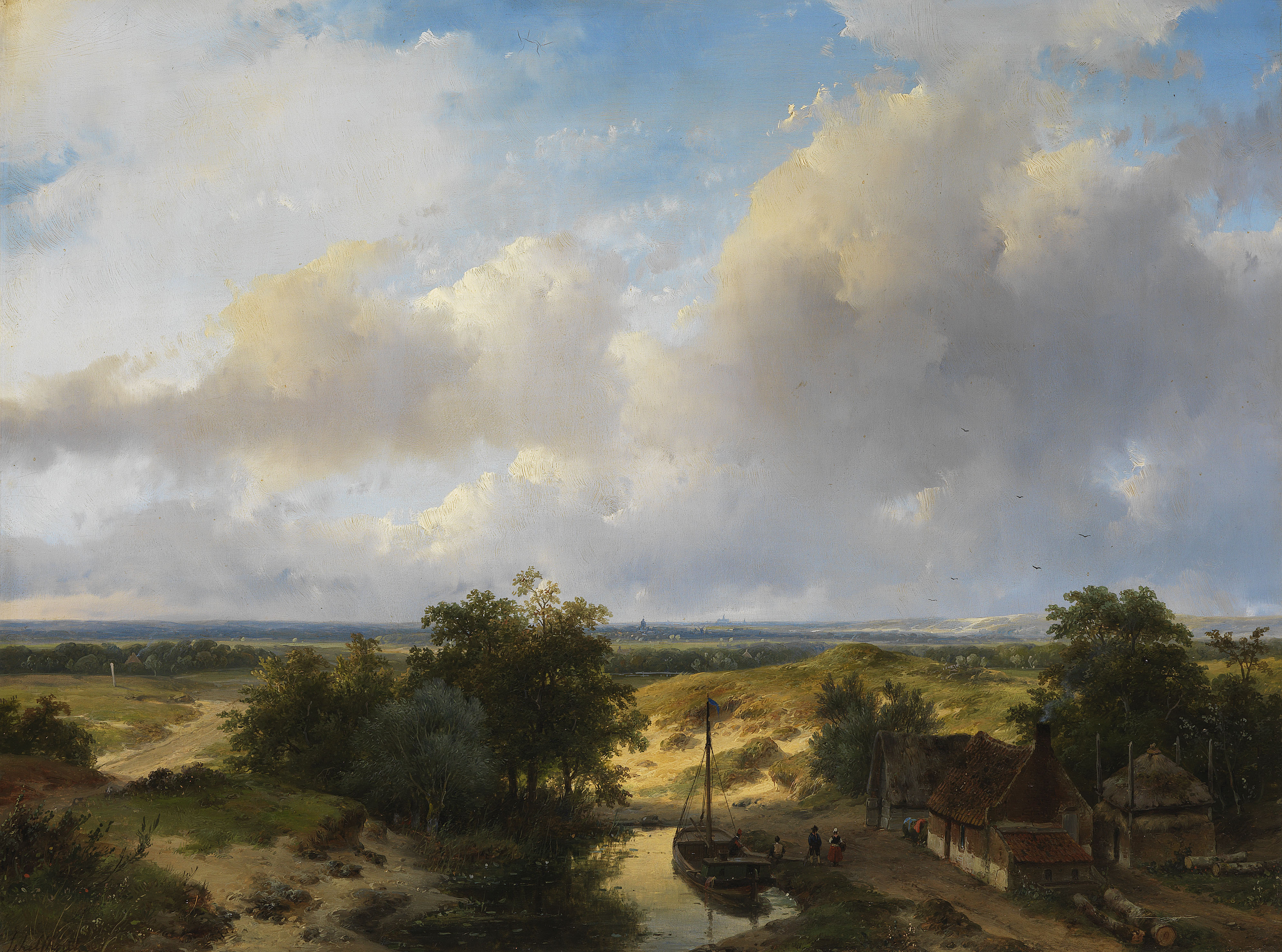
Andreas Schelfhout, 1845
