= Goldweigher's Field =

1651 etching by Rembrandt

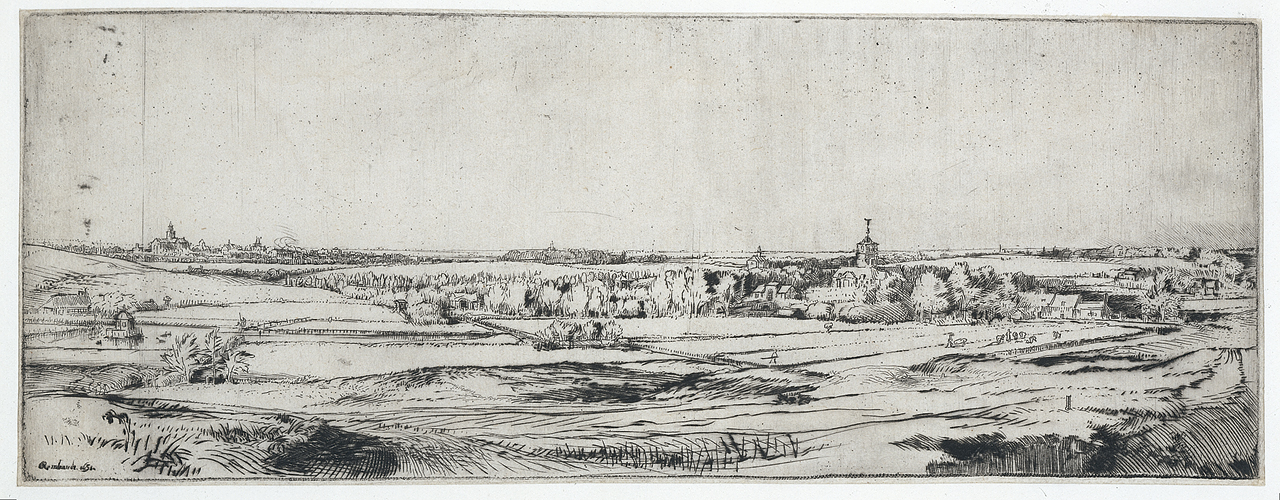
- Artist: Rembrandt
- Year: 1651
- Type: etching
- Dimensions: 12.1 cm × 31.9 cm (4.8 in × 12.6 in)

The Goldweigher's Field is a 1651 etching by Rembrandt now held by many museums, including the British Museum, the Rijksmuseum, The Morgan Library & Museum, and the Metropolitan Museum of Art. It is based on a landscape drawing in the collection of the Museum Boijmans van Beuningen.

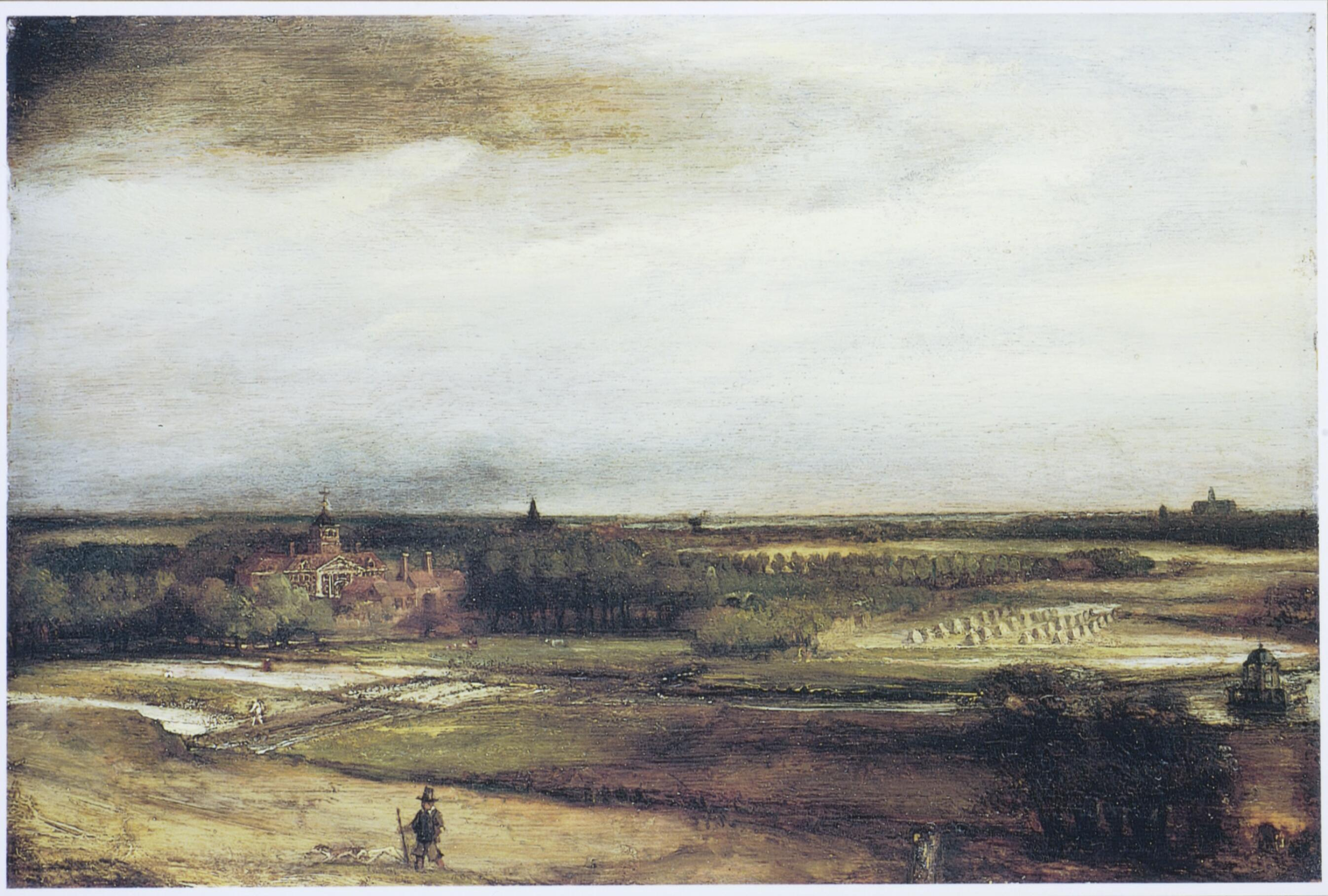
View of Saxenburg estate with bleaching fields near Haarlem, by Philips Koninck

It was mistakenly named after the so-called home of the Goldweigher, a portrait that Rembrandt etched, but shows in fact the Saxenburg estate of Bloemendaal with the St. Bavochurch of Haarlem in the distance. The owner of the Saxenburg estate at that time was Christoffel Thijs, the man who sold Rembrandt his house in Amsterdam (today's Rembrandt House Museum). The perspective is taken from the high dunes of Bloemendaal and shows the mirror image of the drawing.

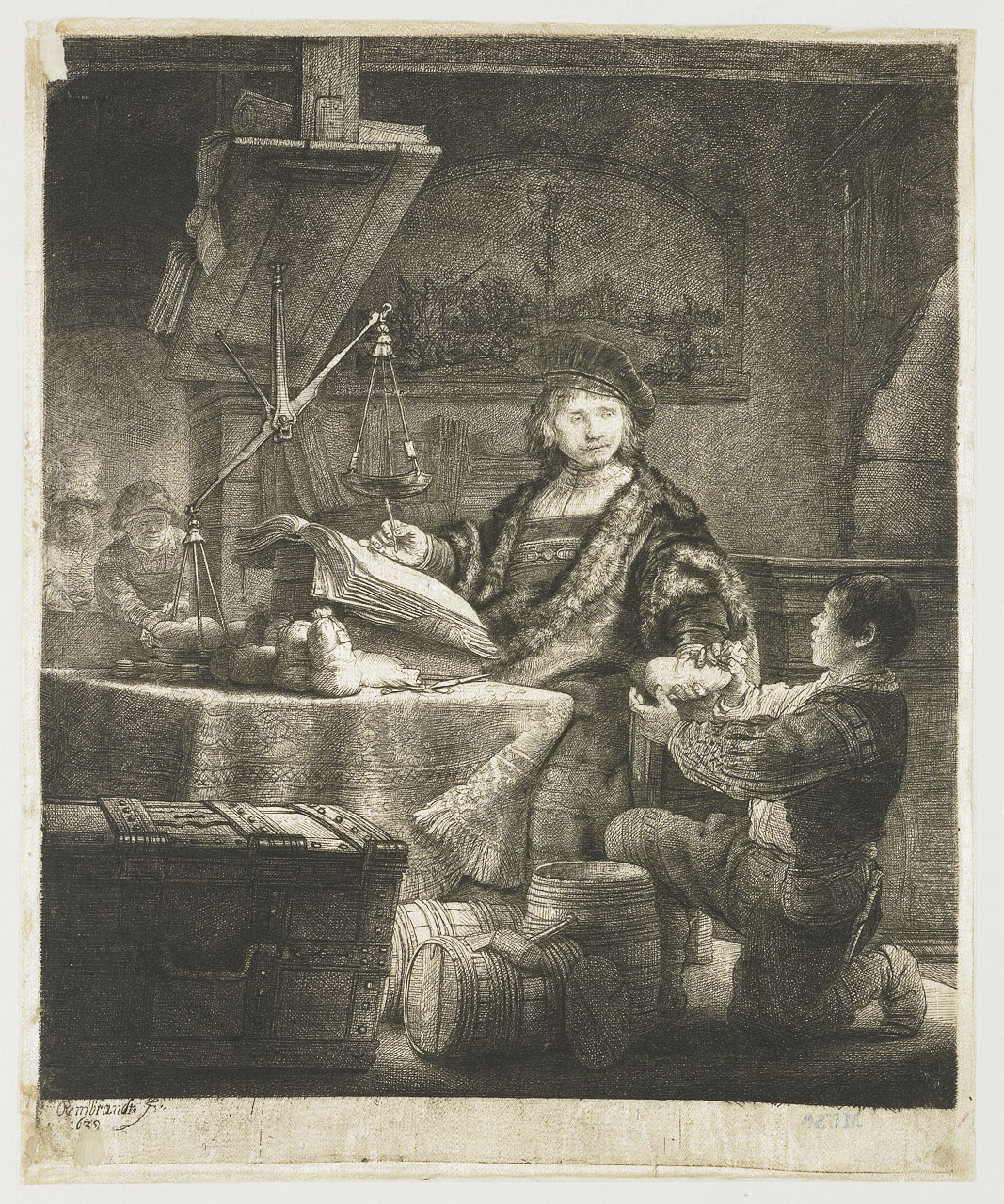
Portrait of Jan Wtenbogaert, a.k.a. The Gold-Weigher, Rembrandt, 1639

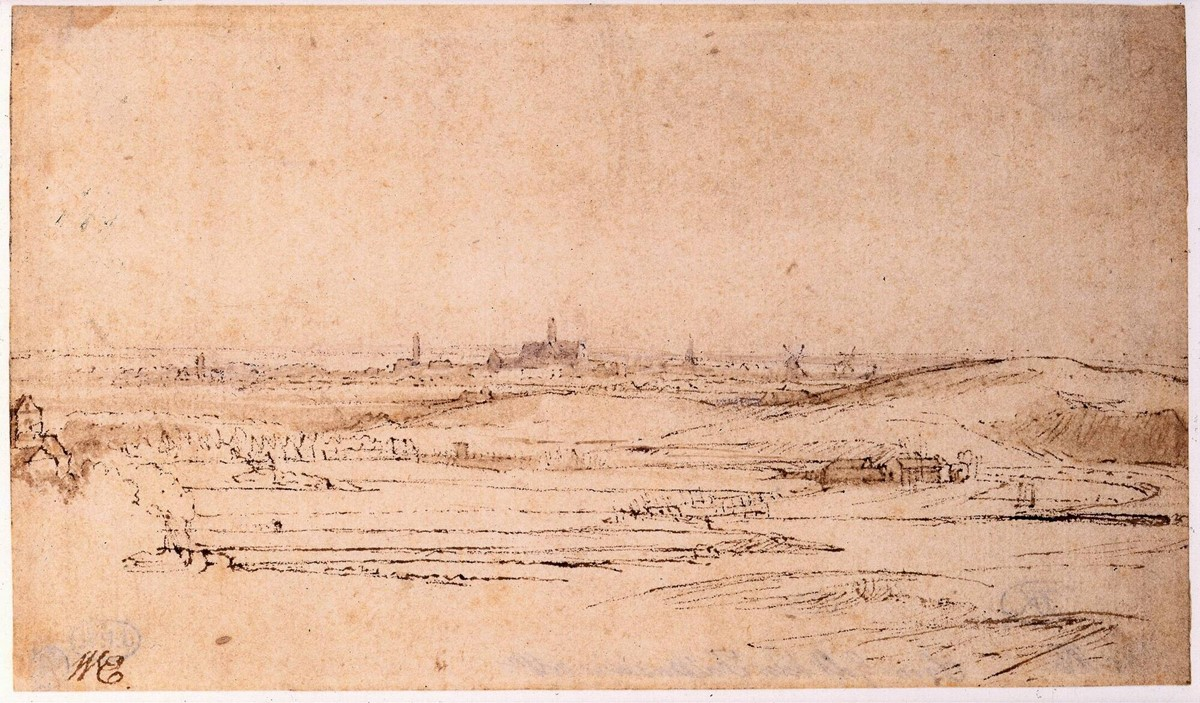
Drawing View of Haarlem with the Saxenburg Estate in the Foreground, in Boijmans van Beuningen

The painter Philips Koninck painted a Haerlempje showing the Saxenburg estate with bleachfields, and this painting shows that the field that Rembrandt depicted was used in the summer months by a bleachery. The steeple between the estate on the left and the Haarlem St. Bavochurch in the distance is the Bloemendaal church, which is also visible in the Rembrandt etching and still exists. Saxenburg itself was torn down.

== See also ==
- List of drawings by Rembrandt
- List of etchings by Rembrandt
