= View of Haarlem from the Northwest, with the Bleaching Fields in the Foreground =

Painting by Jacob van Ruisdael

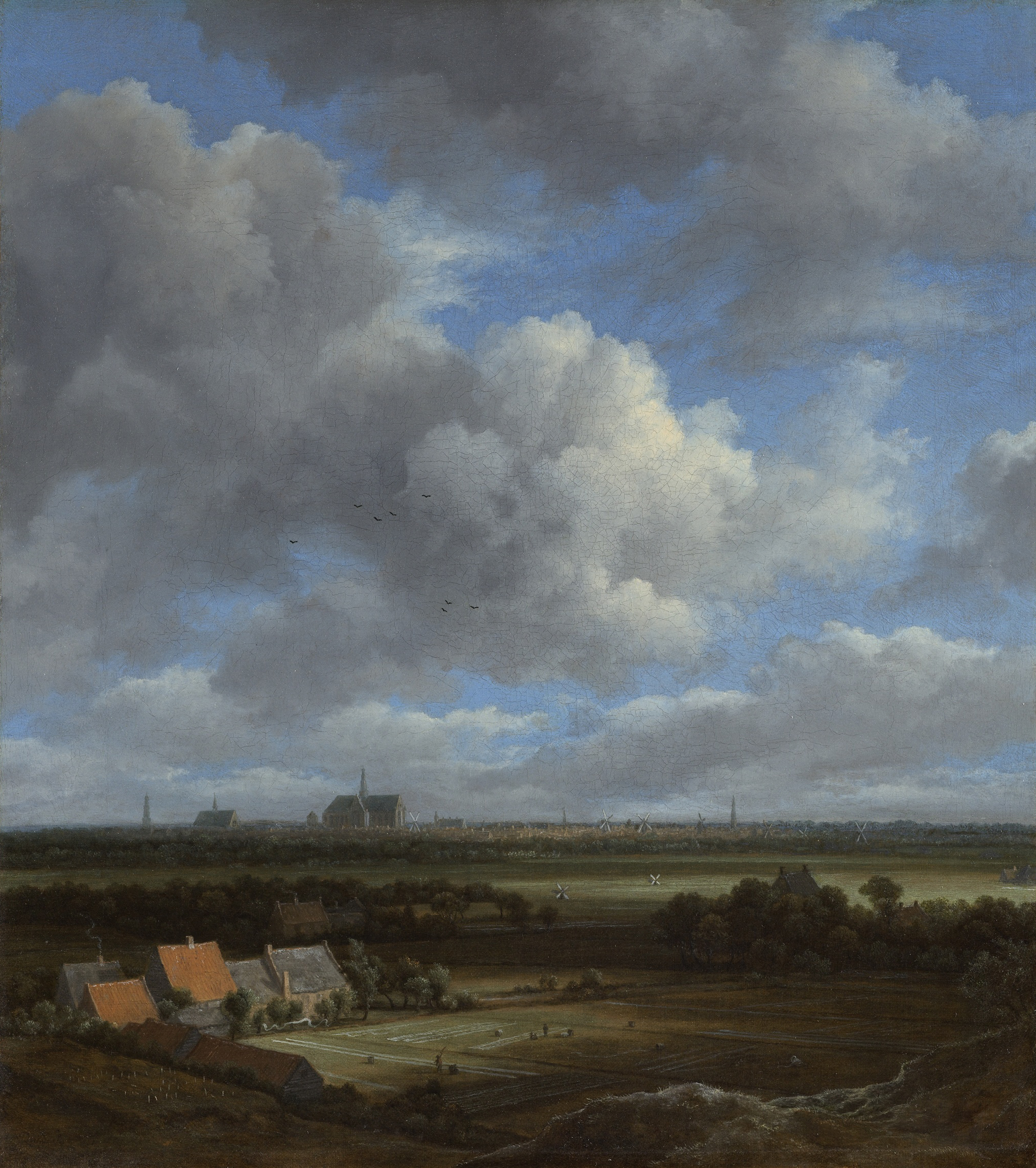
- Artist: Jacob van Ruisdael
- Year: 1670s
- Dimensions: 62.2 cm × 55.2 cm (24.5 in × 21.7 in)
- Location: Rijksmuseum; Amsterdam

View of Haarlem from the Northwest, with the Bleaching Fields in the Foreground (c. 1670s) is an oil on canvas painting by the Dutch landscape painter Jacob van Ruisdael. It is an example of Dutch Golden Age painting and is now in the collection of the Rijksmuseum.

This painting was documented by Hofstede de Groot in 1911, who wrote; "55. VIEW OF HAARLEM, WITH BLEACHING-GROUNDS IN FRONT. Sm. Suppl. 52. In the immediate foreground is part of the hill, near Overveen, from which one views the broad plain. Below, to the left, is a row of five gabled cottages roofed with red tiles; on the meadow to the right long pieces of linen are spread out to bleach. The sun shines on the houses and part of the bleaching-grounds, but the shadow of a passing cloud lies on the edge of them. There is also a patch of light in the right middle distance, behind a farm hidden amid trees. At the back are the roofs and church towers of Haarlem, partly illumined by sunlight. The clouds are high in the sky. Signed in full on the left at foot; canvas, 17 inches by 11 1/2 inches. In the collection of Baron van Nagell van Ampsen, The Hague, 1842 (Sm.). Sale. A. W. C. Baron Nagell van Ampsen, The Hague, September 5, 1851, No. 54 (1750 florins, Roos). In the collection of L. Dupper, Amsterdam; bequeathed in 1870 to the Rijksmuseum. In the Rijksmuseum, Amsterdam, Dupper bequest, 1910 catalogue, No. 2071."

This scene is very similar to other large panorama paintings (often referred to as Haerlempjes today) that Ruisdael made of Haarlem in this period and these often served as inspiration for later painters of landscape. It is taken from the same perspective from a high dune in Bloemendaal as several other Ruisdael paintings.

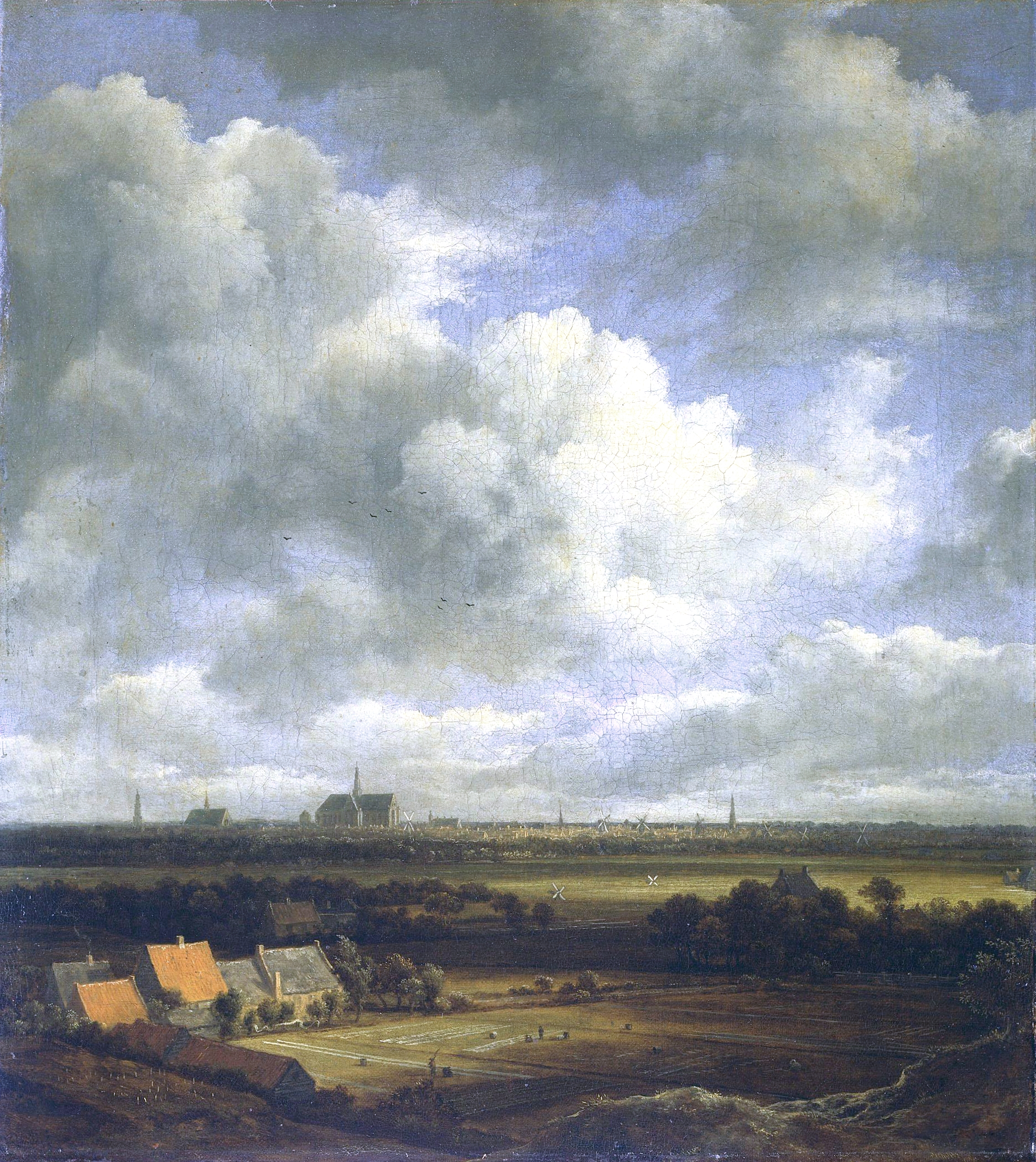
View of Haarlem with Bleaching Fields.

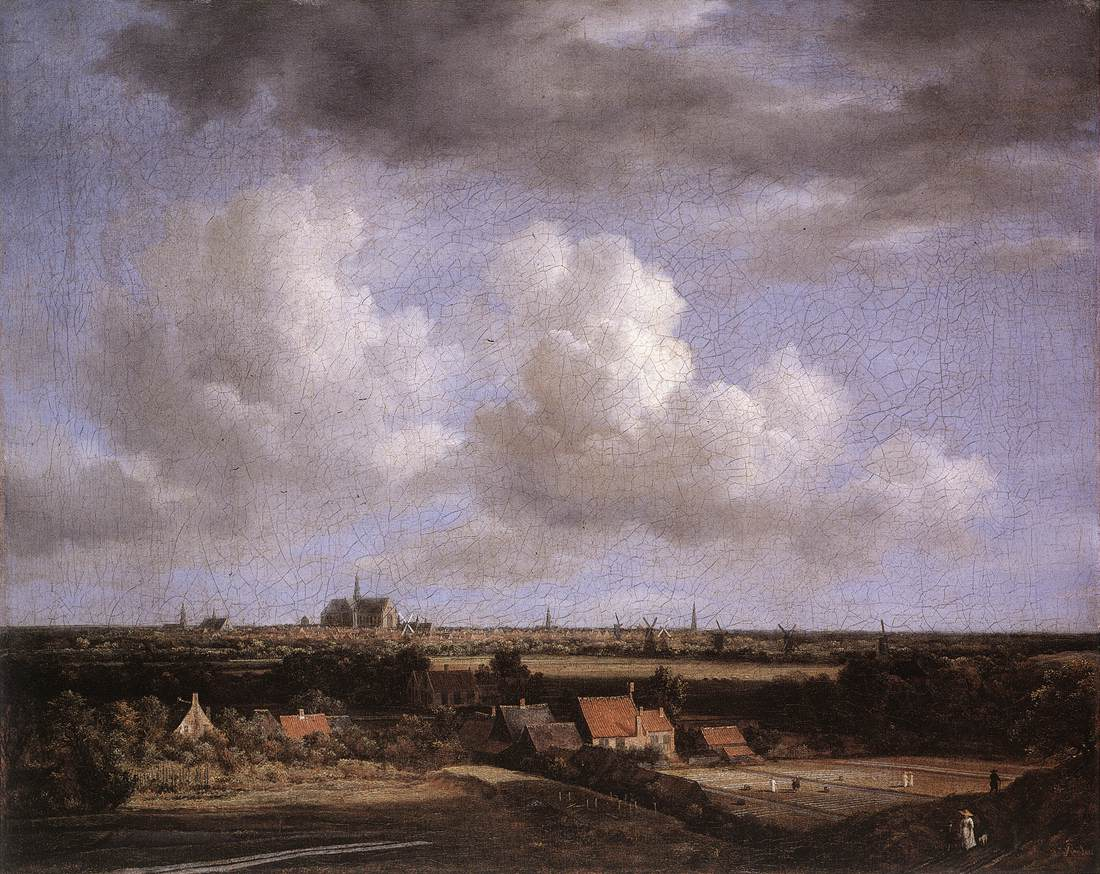
Gemäldegalerie.

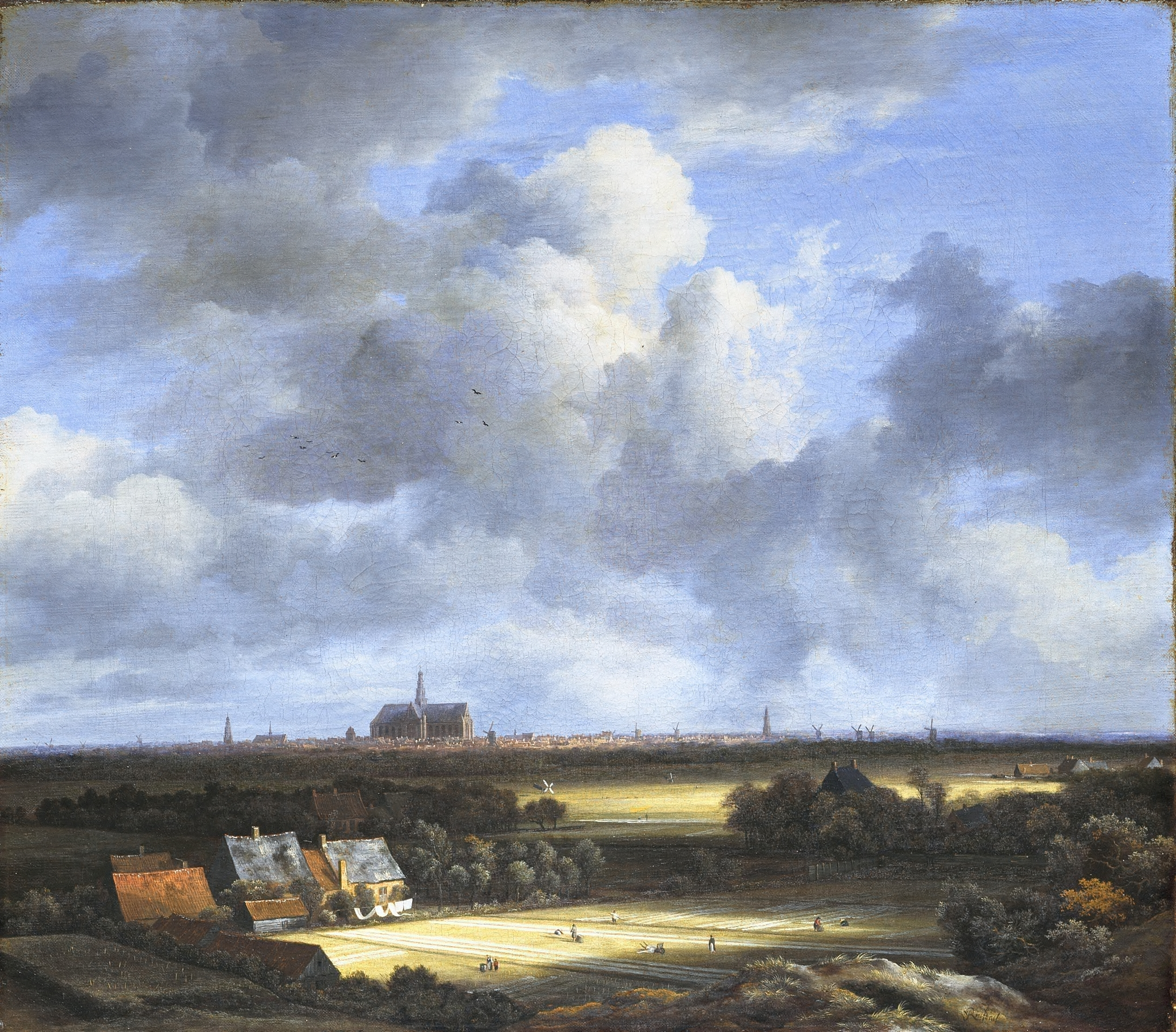
Mauritshuis.

== See also ==
- List of paintings by Jacob van Ruisdael
