= Reyer Claesz Suycker =

Dutch painter

- Born: 1590
- Died: 1653 (aged 62–63); Haarlem

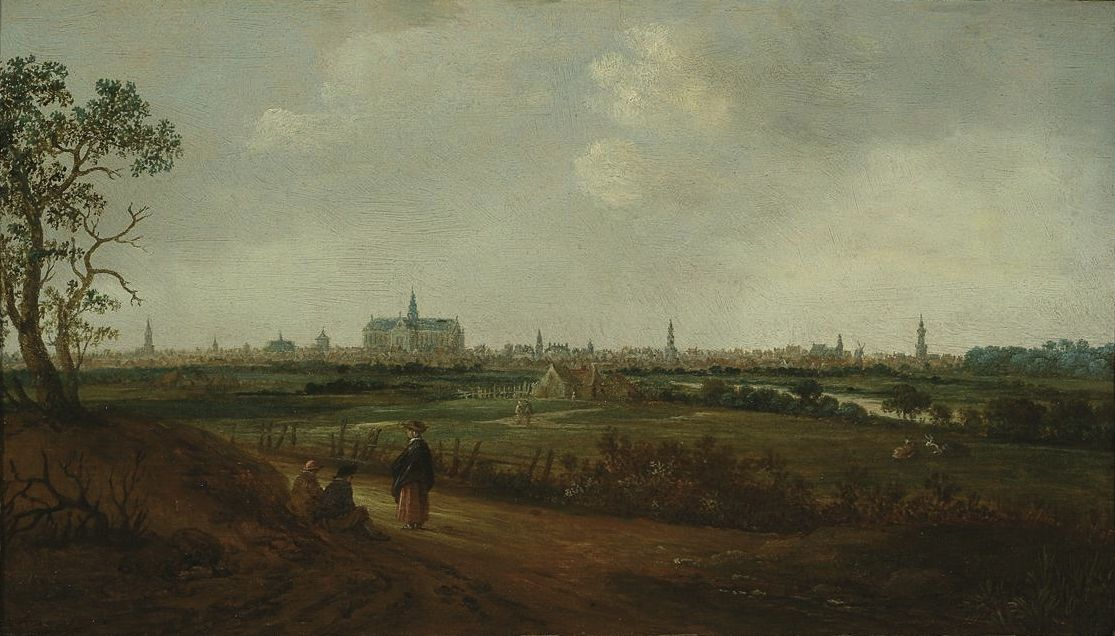
View of Haarlem, 1630s

Reyer Claesz Suycker or Reyer Claesz Suijcker; Reyer Claesz; Reyer Claesz. Suycker (1590 – 1653) was a Dutch Golden Age landscape painter from Haarlem.

Suycker was born as the son of Nicolas Zuyker, a master painter in Haarlem whose workshop he inherited. In 1639 (following his father's death?) he became a master in the Haarlem Guild of St. Luke and in 1643 he was dean of the guild. He was clearly active in Haarlem before that, because Samuel Ampzing mentioned him as a good landscape painter in 1628. His works were misattributed for years to Rafael Camphuysen, who also signed his works "RC". He was rediscovered by Horst Gerson in 1946. He died in Haarlem.
