= Dutch garden =

Gardens in styles thought to be Dutch

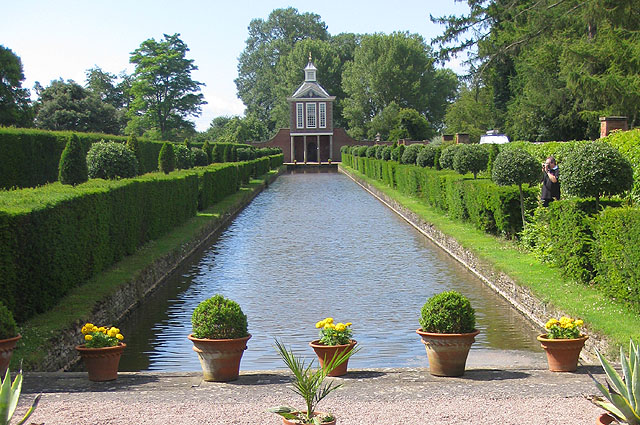
The Main Canal at Westbury Court Garden, now restored to its putative state in 1700.

Dutch garden refers firstly to gardens in the Netherlands, but also, mainly in the English-speaking countries, to various types of gardens traditionally considered to be in a Dutch style, a presumption that has been much disputed by garden historians in recent decades. Historically gardens in the Netherlands have generally followed trends from neighbouring countries, but from the Early Modern period, Dutch gardens were distinctive for the wider range of plants available over the rest of Europe north of the Alps, and an emphasis on individual specimen plants, often sparsely planted in a bed. In the 17th century and into the 18th, the Dutch dominated the publishing of botanical books, and established the very strong position in the breeding and growing of garden plants, which they still retain. They were perhaps also distinguished by their efficient use of space, and in large examples, the use of topiary (sculptured bushes and trees) and small "canals", long thin, rectangular artificial stretches of water. When a distinctively "Dutch" style is claimed, it generally relates to formal styles in large gardens in the latter part of the 17th century, stretching on for a few decades.

Because the Netherlands is one of the most densely populated countries, gardens are generally small and because houses are placed right next to each other, there is not very much light available. From the 19th century onwards, Dutch gardens adapted to wider trends, mostly from England and France. Dutch gardens are relatively small, and tend to be "self-contained and introspective", with less linkage to the wider landscape around. From the late 18th century onwards, many or most large gardens in the Netherlands adopted the continental version of the English Landscape garden style, at least for the areas beyond the immediate vicinity of the house. There are also many woodland gardens from the late 19th and early 20th centuries.

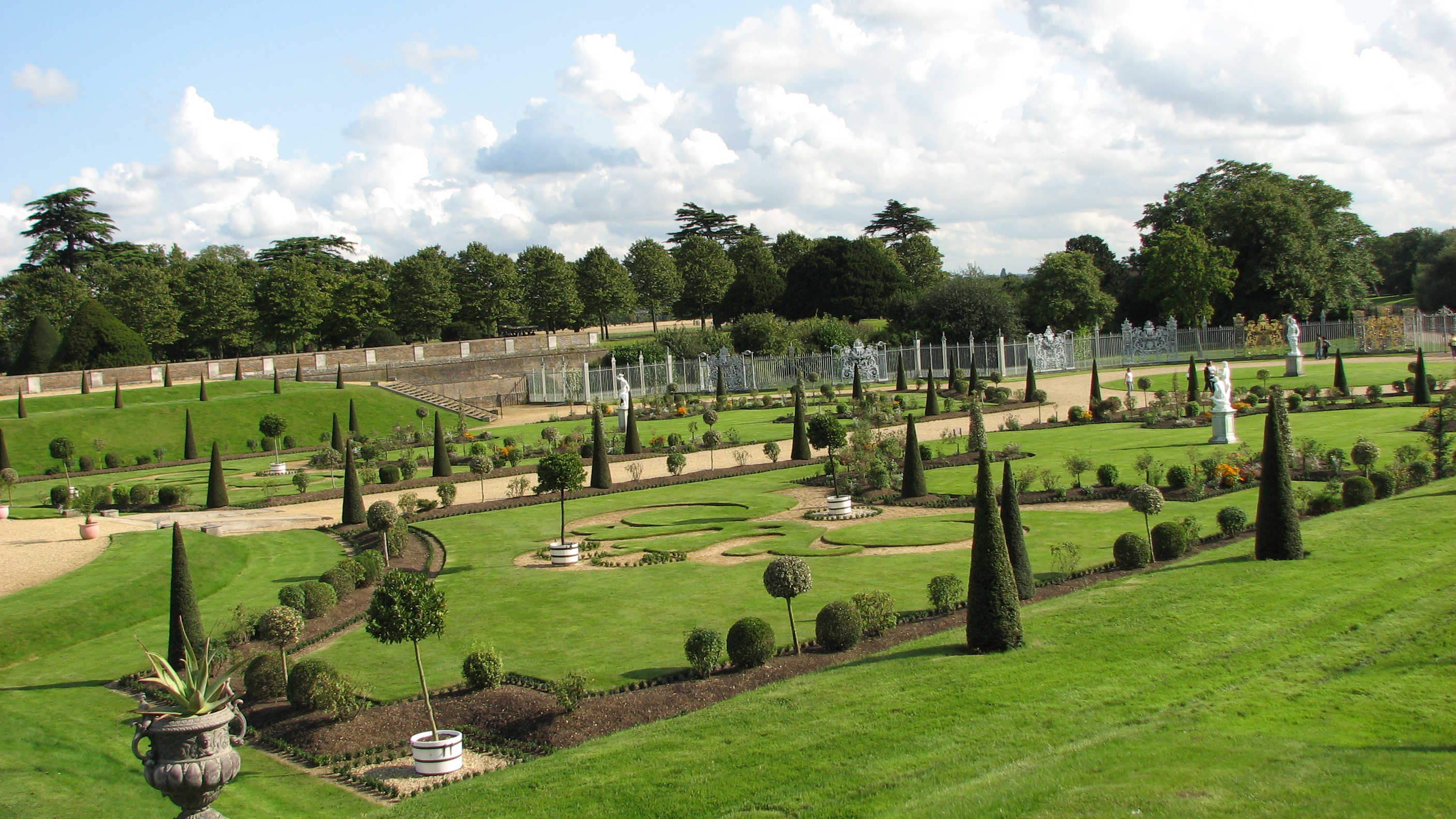
The Privy Garden at Hampton Court Palace, in September

The history of "Dutch-style" gardens abroad perhaps begins in the 17th century. On the one hand these have a concentration on the display of specimen plants, initially often imported from the Netherlands. In larger gardens, canals and topiary are often found. However, both of these features may well have been imported to the Netherlands from France, and their appearance in England may have been from either or both countries. Evergreen hedges, rather than those of deciduous species such as hornbeam, have also been seen as a characteristic Dutch style since the 17th century. David Jacques, in a paper from 2002 called "Who Knows What a Dutch Garden Is?", concludes that the description was never accurate and "It is time that historians of English garden style eschewed labels such as "Dutch".

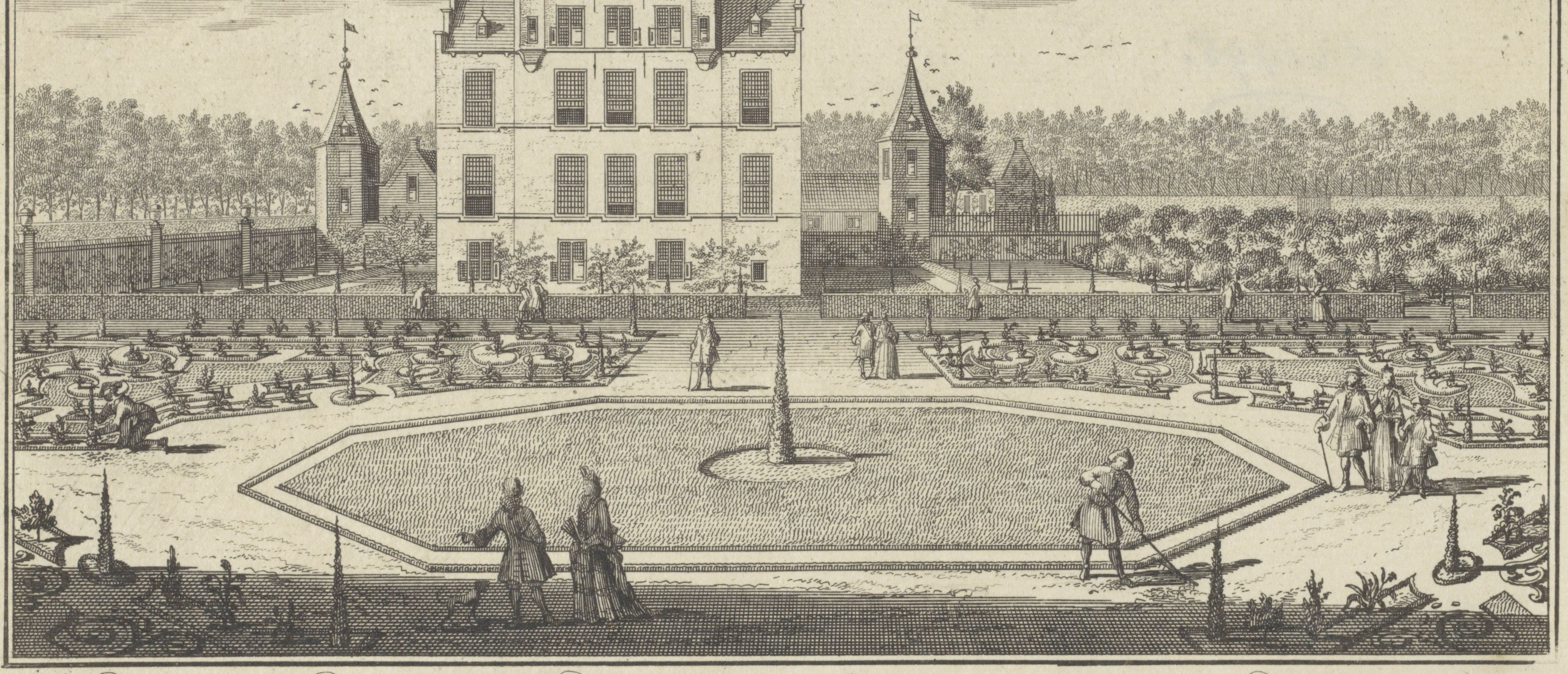
Detail of print of castle garden in Utrecht, around 1700

Rectangular flower gardens, often slightly sunk in tiers, and now heavily planted, were seen as "Dutch". Any garden with large numbers of tulips is also easily labelled as a Dutch garden.

== Dutch style ==
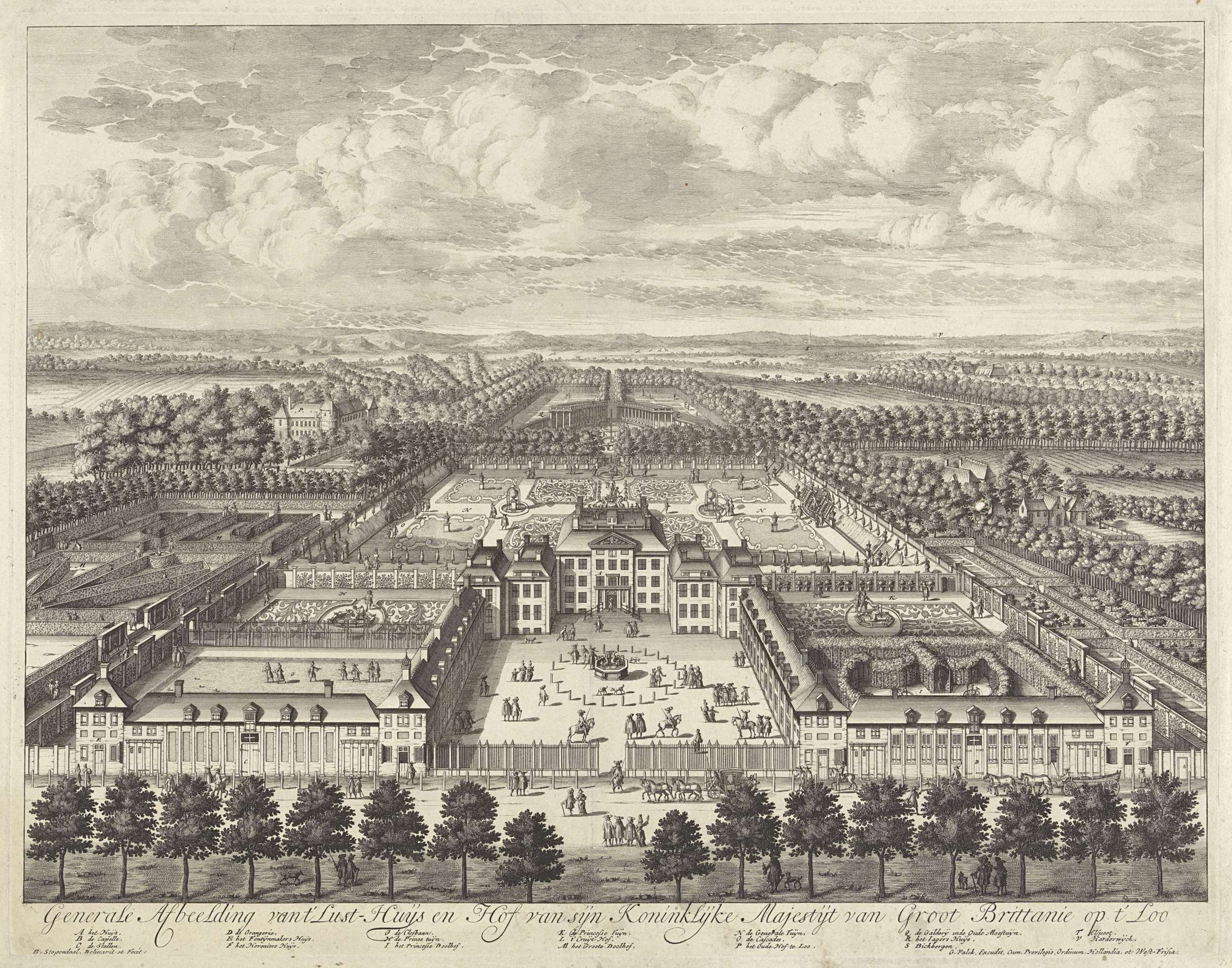
Het Loo Palace, by 1693; perhaps partly planned but not finished.

The gardens of Het Loo Palace, laid out by a pupil of Le Notre under William III, were the largest Dutch version of the French formal garden, in the style of the Gardens of Versailles; in recent decades they have partly been returned to this style, with elaborately patterned parterres. But these could not be said to be typical of the Dutch style.

Even the grandest Dutch 17th century gardens are small in comparison to their French and English equivalents, but often combine the same set of elements "into happily crowded enclosures, with trellises and hedges and curling parterres mirroring the grills of the popular ironwork gates". Land values were high, and the Dutch felt they suffered from strong winds, as well as too much water, dictating a style with ponds, canals and hedges.

Small modern Dutch gardens tend to use many bulbs, and often dwarf conifers in the German style.

== Dutch influence on England ==
In England, Dutch influence became strong for a period after the Dutch King William III of England reached the throne in 1689 through his wife Mary II; both were interested in gardening. Westbury Court Garden, now carefully restored to its design around 1700 is perhaps the best example in England of a more native Dutch style for a large house.

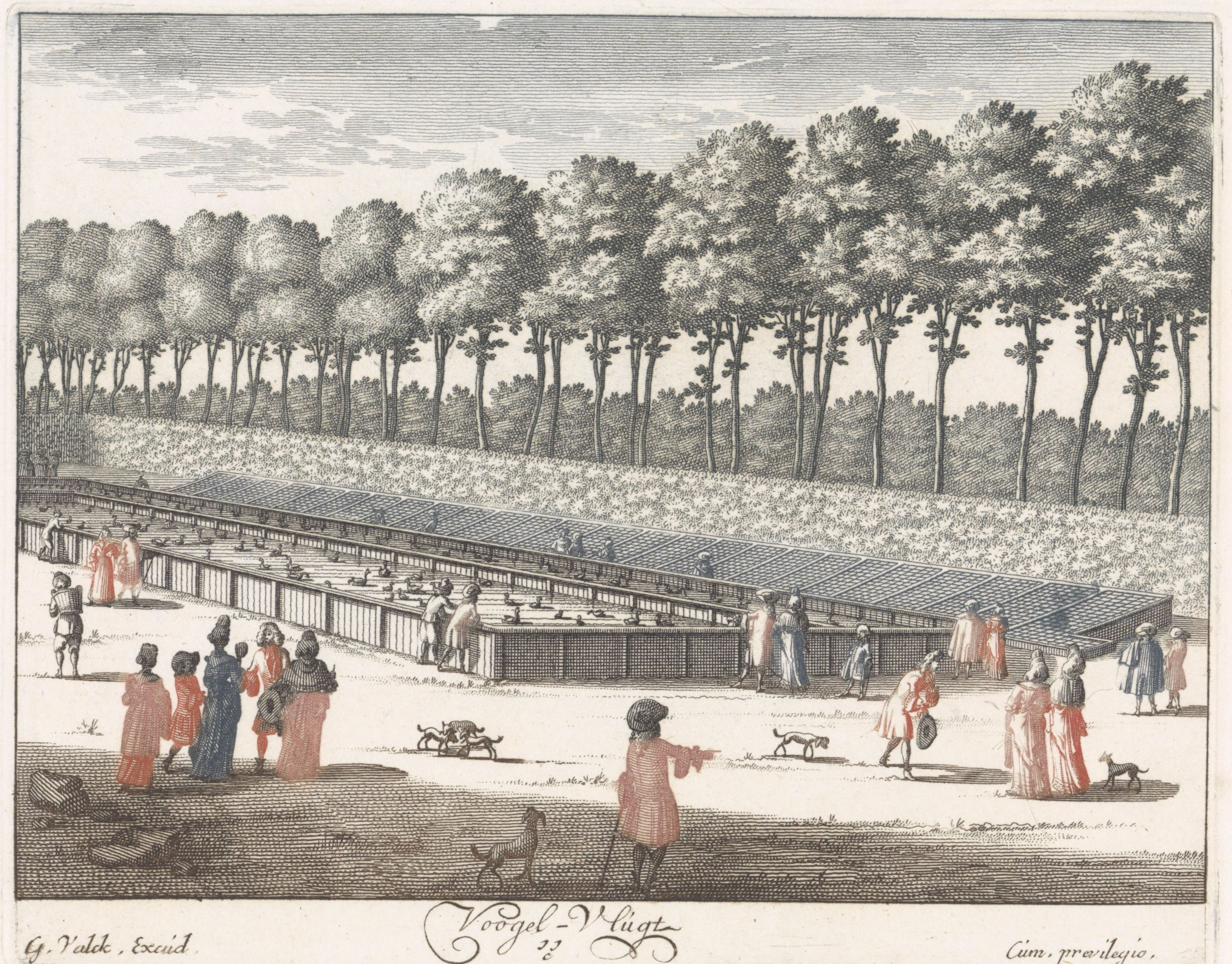
Admiring the waterfowl on a fenced canal at Soestdijk Palace, c. 1695

The restoration at Westbury Court prompted some discussion among English garden historians as to what, if anything, constituted a historical "Dutch garden", and how Dutch the typical features ascribed to them actually were. Christopher Hussey associated the Dutch style not so much with topiary, regarded as diagnostic by many earlier writers, as with canals, giving Westbury Court as the prime example, observes David Jacques, Similarly Miles Hadfield considered that "an essential of Dutch versions of the grand manner was that the ground be tolerably level, with an abundance of water". Later, Hadfield found "not the slightest hint" of a Dutch connection at Westbury Court. To some extent calling formal gardens in England "Dutch" avoided the accusation that they were actually in a style that was essentially French, at a time of wars between England and France.

Even in England, Dutch artists completely dominated the newly popular genre of paintings and prints of country houses and their gardens from about 1660 to the 1730s.

The Dutch garden was the description given to a particular type of rectangular flower garden space, often enclosed within hedges or walls, even if part of a larger garden or parkland. The Dutch version of the French formal garden, this space would be laid out in a highly cultivated and geometrical, often symmetrical, fashion, shaped by plantings of highly coloured flowers, originally very well-spaced by modern standards, and edged with box or other dense and clipped shrubs, or low walls (sometimes in geometrical patterns), and sometimes, also, with areas of artificial water, with fountains and water butts, which were also laid out in symmetrical arrangements.

A particular Dutch feature is the koepel or pavilion, generally built of brick and raised up to give a view of the garden. Westbury Court and Hampton Court have two-storey examples, the latter the Banqueting House designed by William Talman for William III, overlooking on one side a row of three rectangular garden rooms for flowers, and on the other the river Thames.

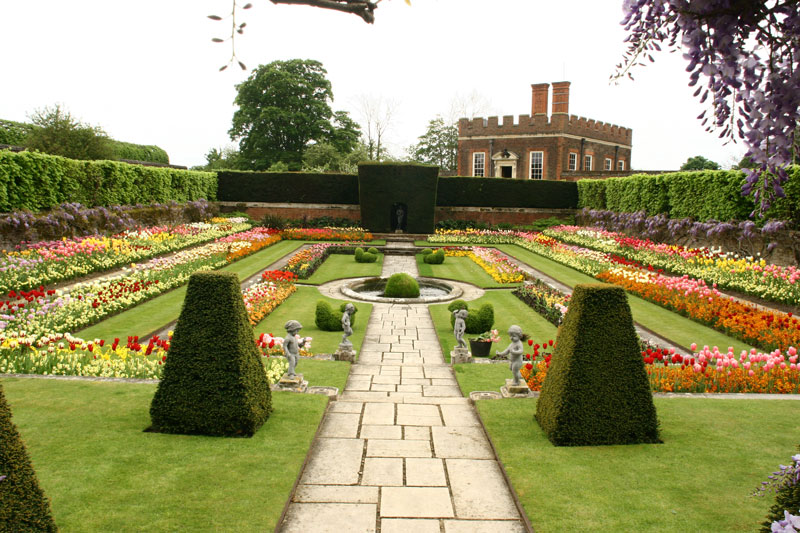
"Dutch-style" garden at Hampton Court Palace, with modern planting, the Banqueting House behind.

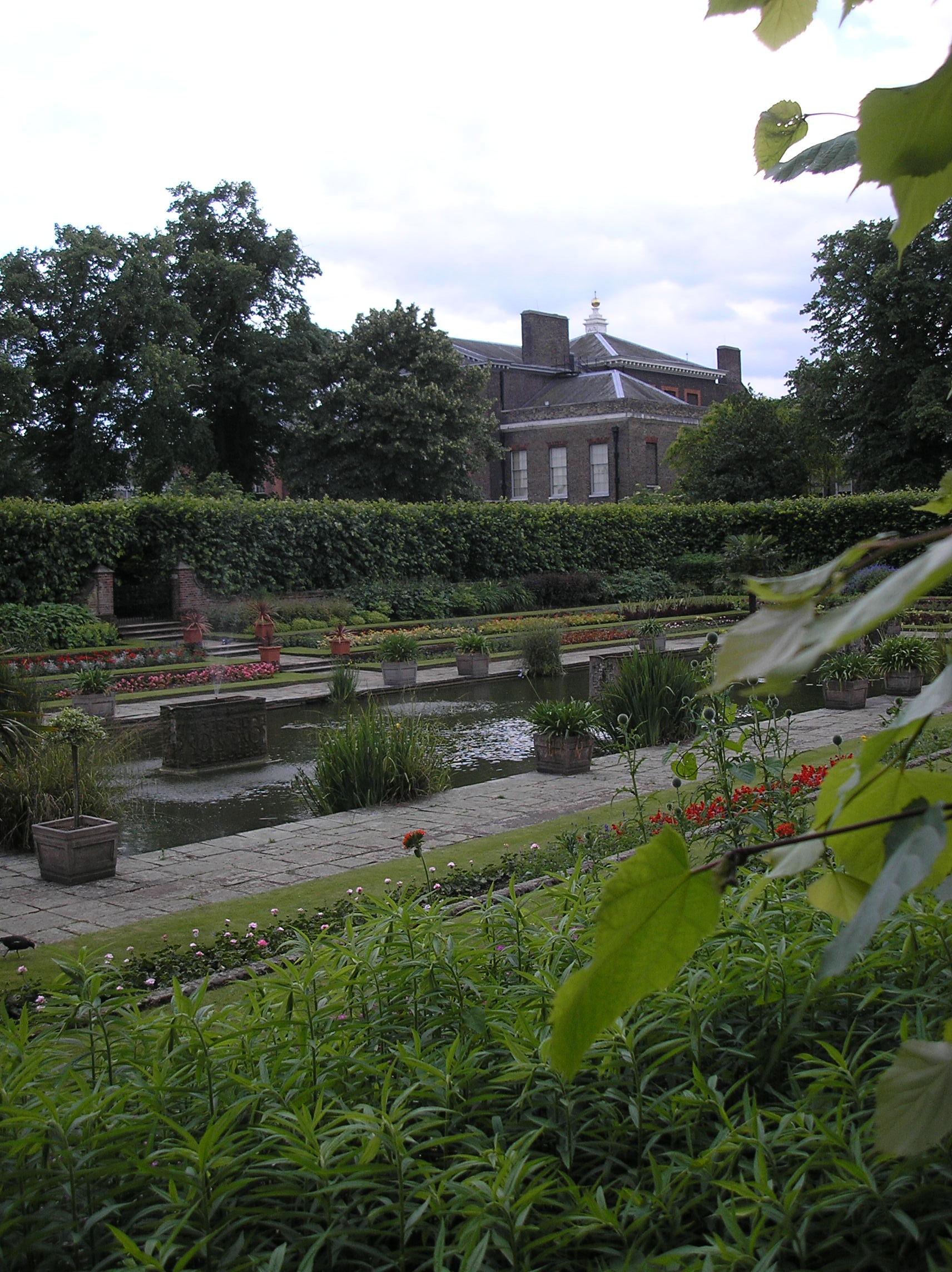
Kensington Palace Dutch Garden

Later, in England the term was used for flower gardens that are heavily planted within a geometric frame. The flower beds and areas of water would be intersected by geometrical path patterns, to make it possible to walk around the garden without damaging any of its features. An example, not now planted in an authentic style, is to be found adjacent to Kensington Palace, due south of the orangery. The Privy Garden at Hampton Court Palace has been restored in recent decades in a more authentic version of the style around 1700, when it was planted under William III. Unlike Louis XIV's much larger Gardens of Versailles, this was only accessible to a small group of courtiers. Another example, less ambitious, is at Clandon Park in Surrey. The Dutch garden, with its geometry and formality, was in opposition to the cottage garden, which in its modern form is characterised by grass, winding and asymmetrical paths (if any) and a blurring of the lines between flowers and grass by allowing shrubs to grow over flower bed boundaries.

As the English landscape garden style took hold in the mid-18th century, the label began to be applied in a "derogatory" sense to formal gardens in general, in the "distortions of polemicists". Francis Coventry, a clergyman and writer, in his 1753 magazine piece on "Strictures on the Absurd Novelties introduced in Gardening" said William Kent had rescued English gardens from "Dutch absurdity". In 1755 Richard Owen Cambridge wrote that the "Dutch" style had "for more than half a century deformed the face of nature in this country". In 1806, Humphry Repton, the leading garden designer of the day, said the "Dutch style" lasted from the accession of William III in 1689 for half a century, to be replaced by the "English style" of Capability Brown "to restore the ground to its original shape".

== Garden of Holland ==
The small, fenced, Garden of Holland, defended by the Dutch Maiden and the Batavian Lion was, and to some extent still is, a popular patriotic metaphor for the independence of the Netherlands, first seen in the late 16th century. It draws from the medieval Hortus Conclusus. Many prints and forms of the decorative arts depict it, a few of which have interest from the garden history angle. Where there is a single tree in the garden, it represents the House of Orange, which often needs re-planting.

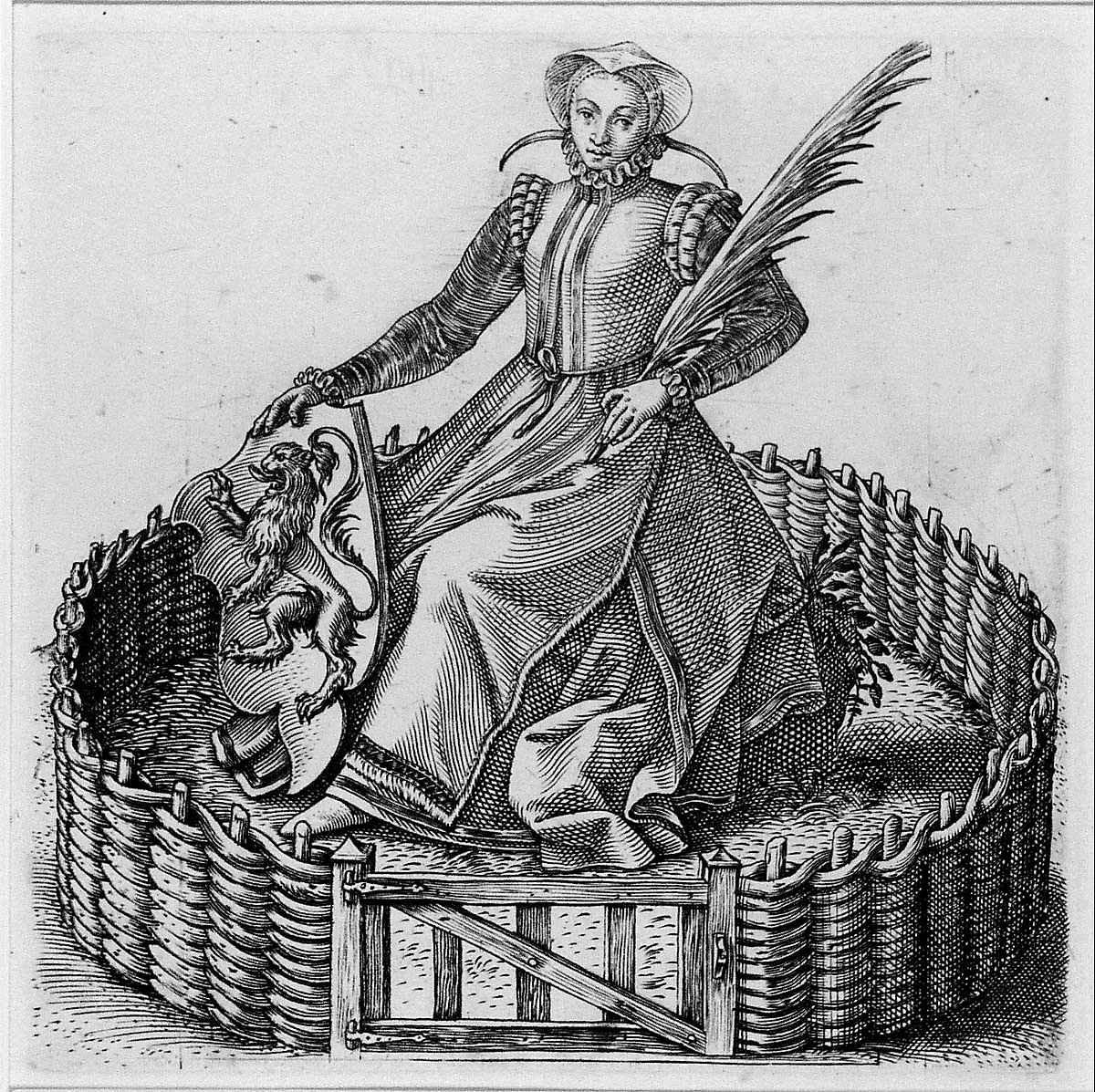
Dutch Maiden in the garden of Holland, 1563, by Philips Galle

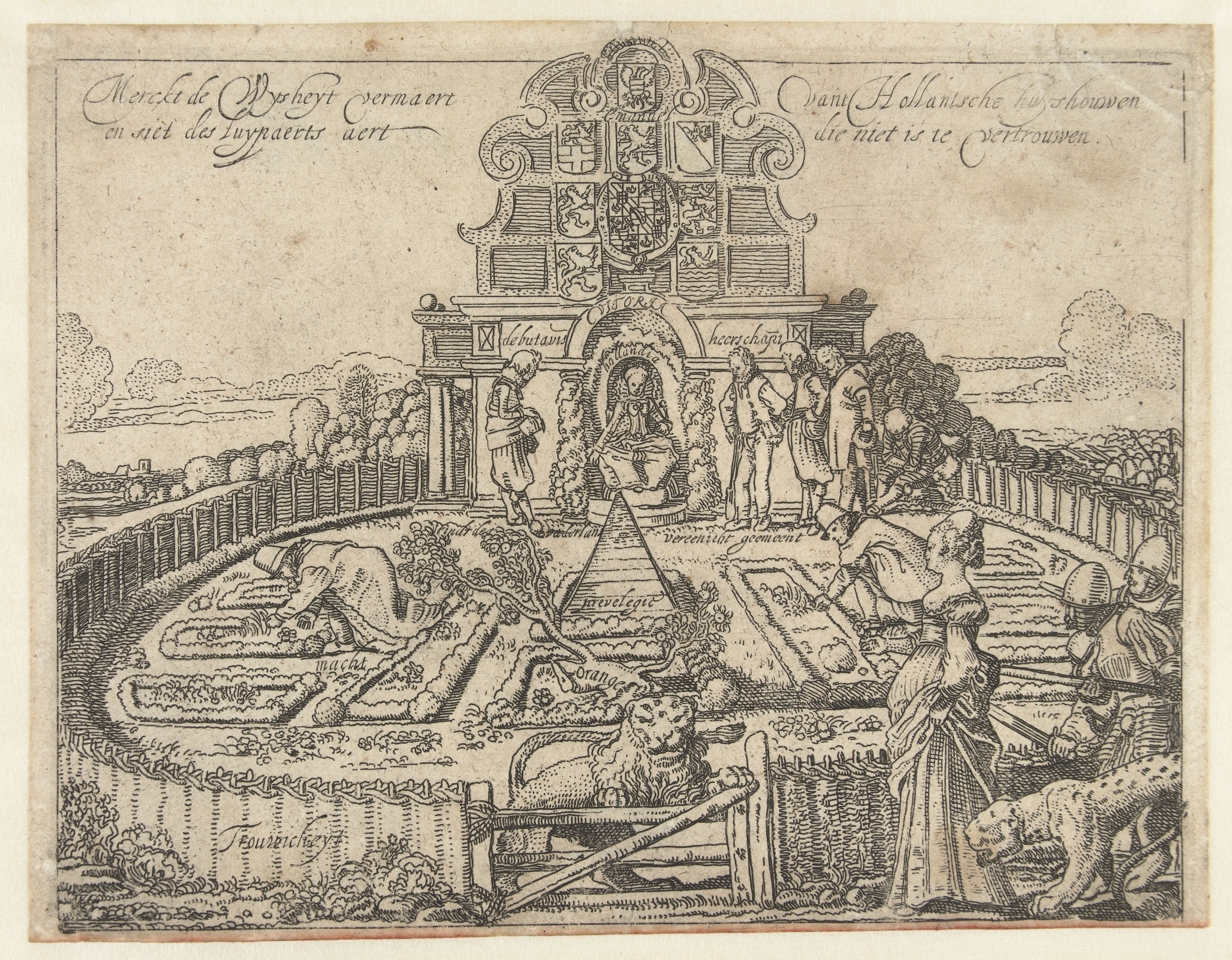
Allegorical print of 1615; the Spanish come to visit, as the Orange tree slumps over.

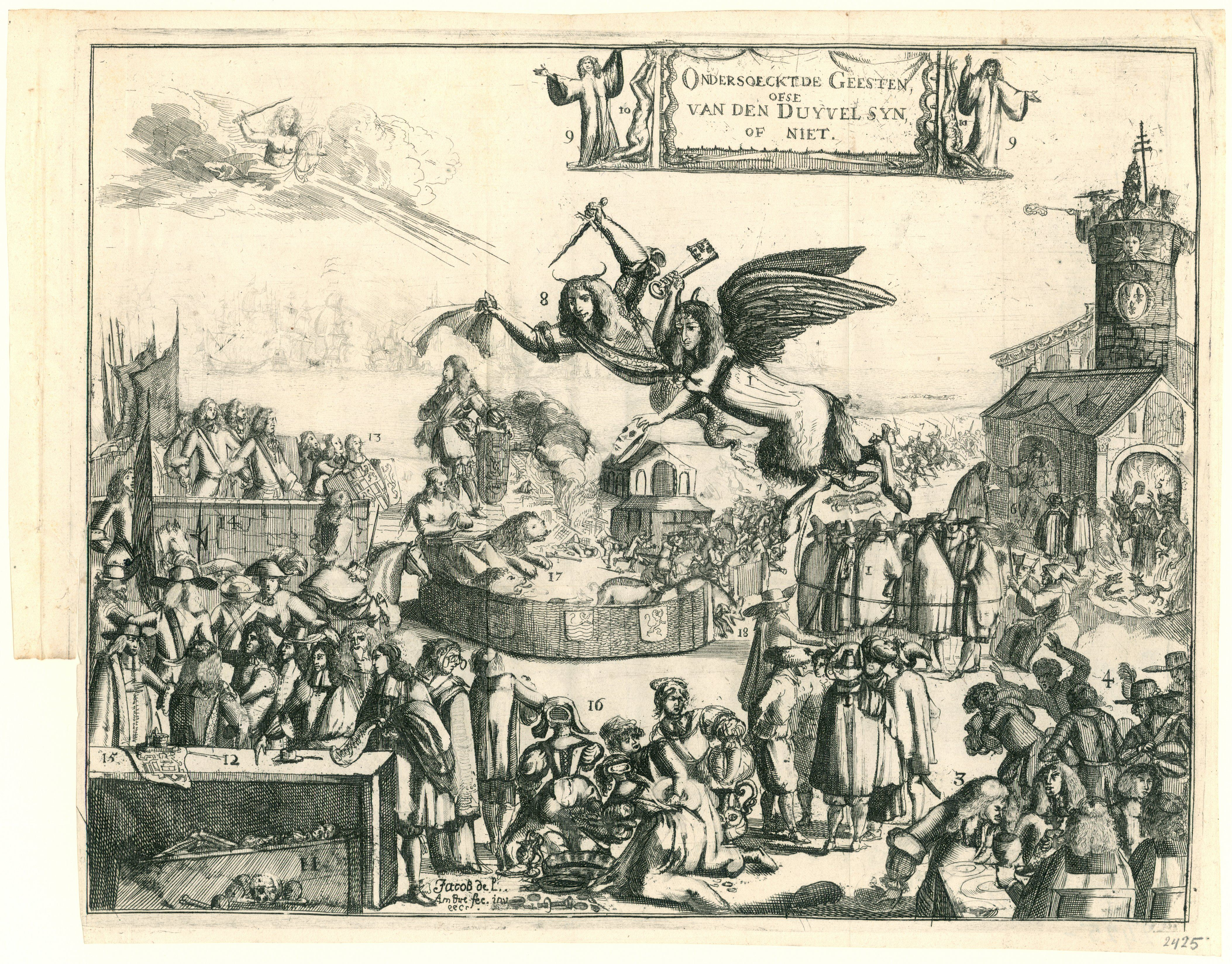
The French invade, 1672–75

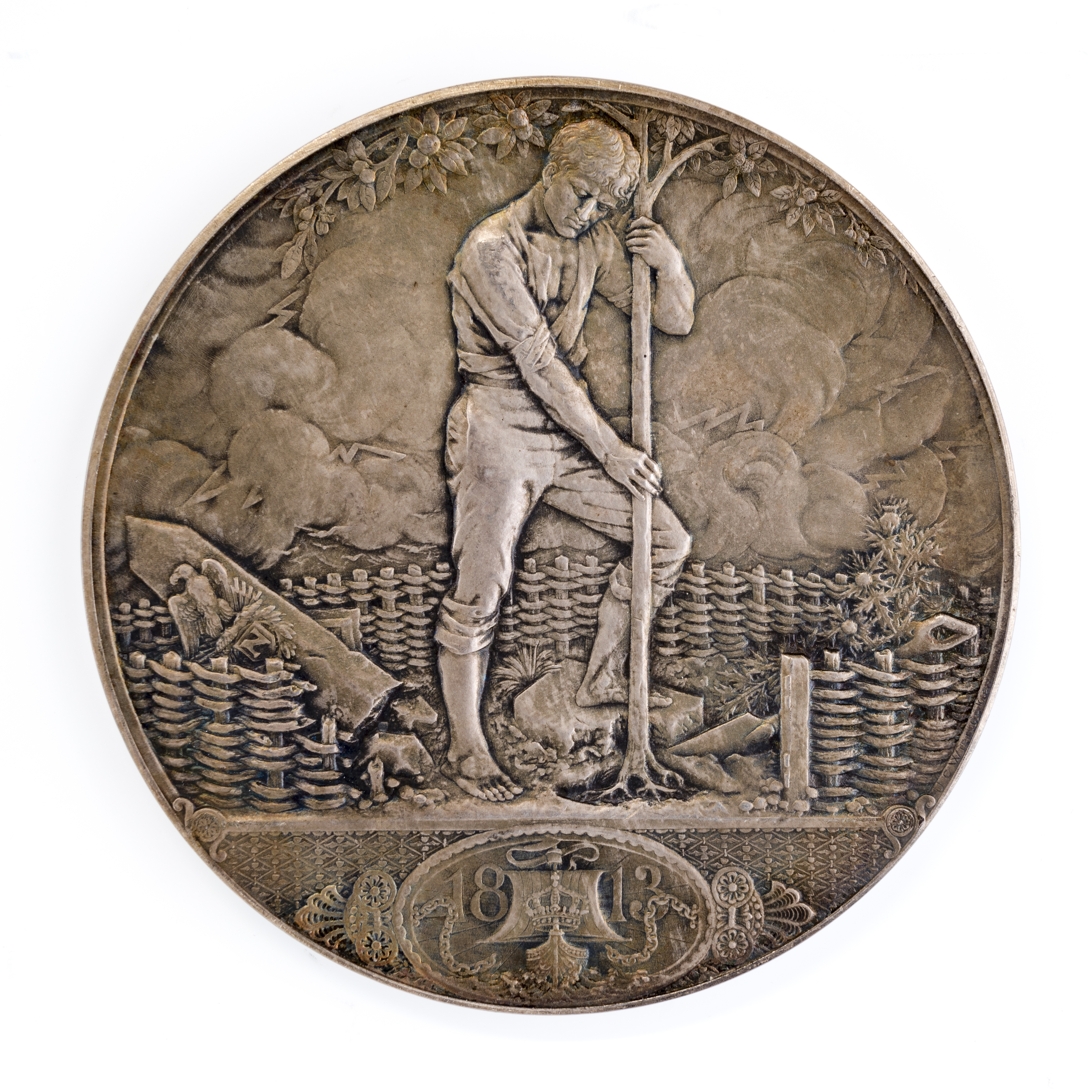
Medal of 1913, the centennial of the French under Napoleon being expelled.

== Flora ==
Common flowers in the Dutch garden are:

- Tulips
- Anemones
- Calla Lily
- Narcissus
- Roses
- Snowdrops
- Crocuses

== Noteworthy gardens in the Netherlands ==
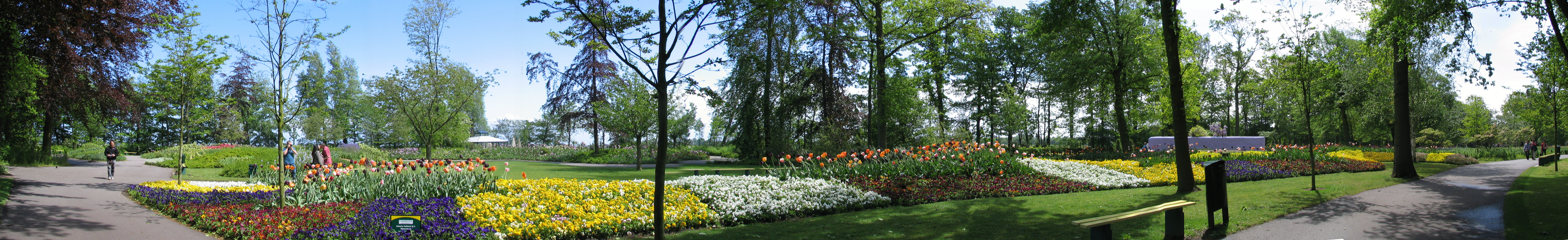
Panoramic view of the Keukenhof gardens

Some noteworthy public Dutch gardens are:

- The Keukenhof
- Prinsentuin (Groningen) mainly formal garden for an 18th-century palace
- Gardens of Arcen Castle
- Gardens of Oud-Valkenburg Castle
- Westbury Court Garden
