= Westbury Court Garden =

Historic water garden in Westbury-on-Severn, Gloucestershire, England

Coordinates: 51°49′22″N 02°24′36″W

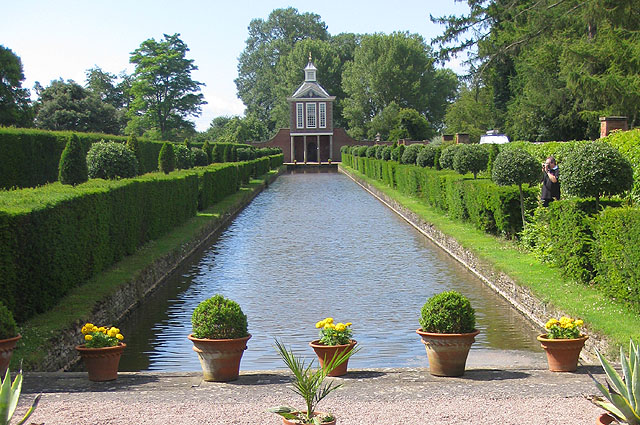
Westbury Court: the Canal (pictured July 2009)

Westbury Court Garden is a Dutch water garden in Westbury-on-Severn, Gloucestershire, England, 9 miles (14 km) southwest of Gloucester. It is a rare survival of seventeenth century garden design and was initially laid out by the owner of Westbury Court, Maynard Colchester I, in 1696–1705. The garden has been under the guardianship of the National Trust since 1967.

== Background ==
The garden was laid out in 1696–1705, a rare survival not to have been replaced in the 18th century by a naturalistic garden landscape as popularised by Capability Brown. It is situated facing the high street of the rural village, extending on low-lying water meadows adjacent to the River Severn; the flat watery ground makes the site well suited to a Dutch-style garden, of which Westbury is the outstanding survival in Britain. Christopher Hussey associated the Dutch style not so much with topiary as with canals, giving Westbury Court as the prime example, observes David Jacques. Similarly Miles Hadfield considered that "an essential of Dutch versions of the grand manner was that the ground be tolerably level, with an abundance of water". Later, Hadfield found "not the slightest hint" of a Dutch connection at Westbury Court, overlooking Maynard Colchester's close friendship with Catharina Boevey of Flaxley Abbey.

== Layout ==
The garden's centrepiece is a 137 metres (449 ft) long canal (illustration, right), centred on a two-storey Dutch style red-brick pavilion at one end and a large wrought iron gate in the wall at the far end, designed to extend the vista from the pavilion out into the surrounding countryside. The main canal is flanked by yew and holly topiary in pyramids and balls. A second red-brick building, a summer house built in 1702–04, overlooks a T-shaped canal running parallel to the main canal. Behind the summer house is a small walled garden of cottage plants and beyond the water garden is an orchard of fruit trees, which also contains an ancient evergreen oak planted in the 17th century, the largest ever recorded, it is also claimed to be the oldest in England.

== History ==
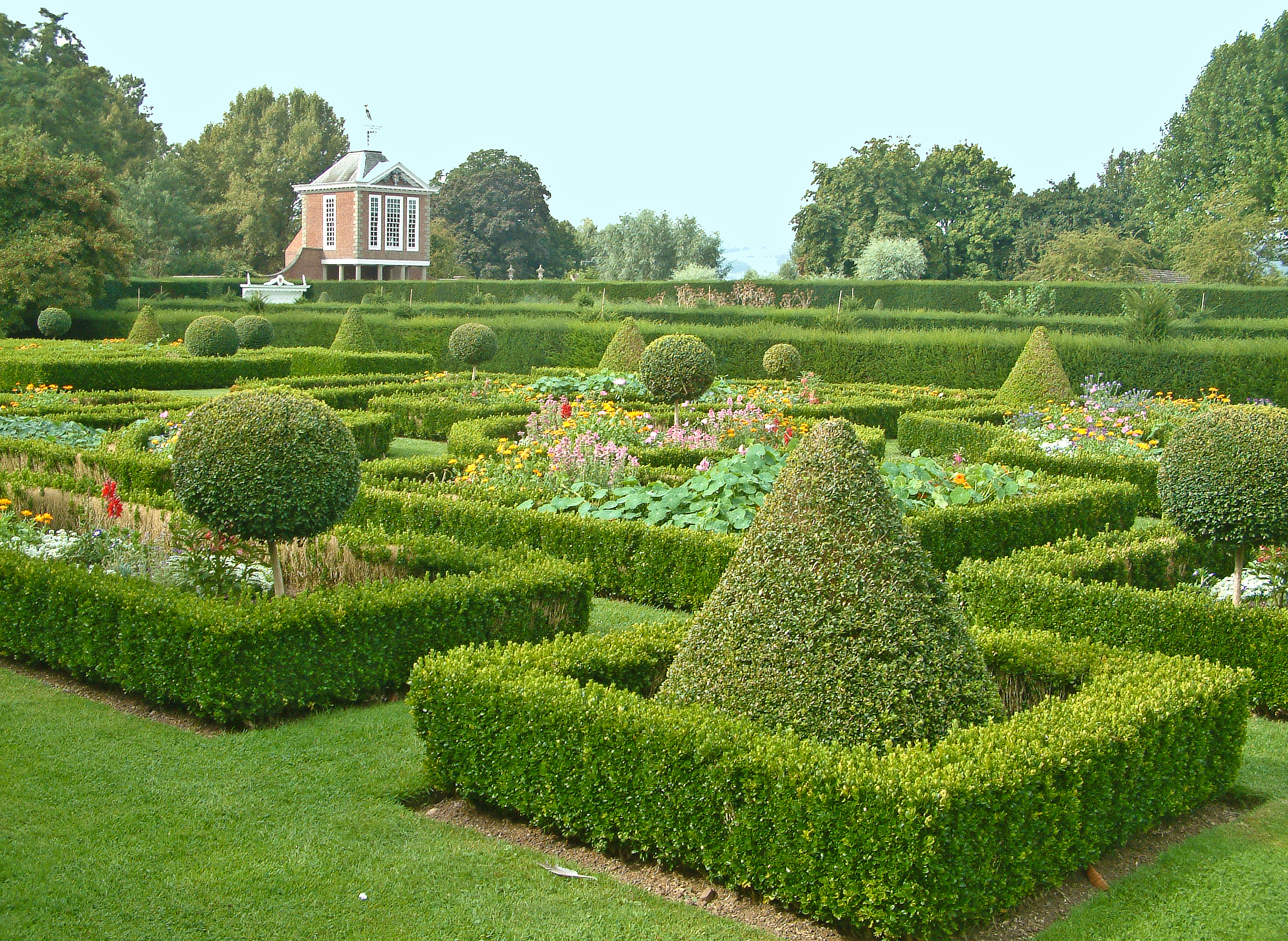
Westbury Court parterres and the pavilion.

The garden at Westbury was created by the owner of Westbury Court, Maynard Colchester I, between 1697, when the brook was first diverted, and 1705. Impetus may have been provided by the canal garden nearby at Flaxley Abbey, which was the seat of Colchester's close friend Catharina Boevey, the widow of William Boevey, member of a Dutch merchant family settled at London; Kip's engraving of Flaxley shows a long rectangular canal, of which only traces remain. Clipped accents to set off the pyramidal yews were provided by 'headed' Laurustinus, headed and pyramidal Phillyrea and "Mizerean trees" in sixes and pairs.

Colchester died in 1715, and the garden continued to be developed by his nephew and heir, Maynard Colchester II, who was probably responsible for the summerhouse and the small walled garden.

Maynard Colchester II also demolished the original late Elizabethan manor house of Westbury Court in the 1740s and built a Palladian mansion in its stead, to designs of a little-known mason of Bristol, Michael Sidnell. This was in turn replaced by a 19th-century country house, no longer standing.

== Johannes Kip engraving ==
Johannes Kip's 1712 engraving of the house and gardens.

In 1707, a birds-eye view of the Westbury Court and its garden was engraved by Johannes Kip for his Britannia Illustrata: Or Views of Several of the Queens Palaces, as Also of the Principal seats of the Nobility and Gentry of Great Britain, Curiously Engraven on 80 Copper Plates; it shows the main canal, topiary, parterres and the pavilion. The cross-axis canal was a later addition, which is not shown, it does appear in a later Kip engraving published in 1712 in Robert Atkyns' The Ancient and Present State of Gloucester.

== Restoration ==
By 1967, with the manor house gone and the garden derelict, the National Trust — who had never been responsible for a garden restoration before — accepted the care of Westbury Court Garden. Miles Hadfield, then president of the Garden History Society, was influential in persuading the Trust to do so. In 1971, work started on the restoration with aid of Colchester's meticulous accounts, Kip's engravings and the evidence on the ground. Authenticity was paramount: in the water garden only plants introduced before 1700 were used, though the appearance aimed at was the maturing garden in about 1720.

The gardens are Grade II* listed on the Register of Historic Parks and Gardens.
