= Upper Lodge Water Gardens =

Water gardens in Bushy Park, London, England

Coordinates: 51.42091°N 0.3535°W

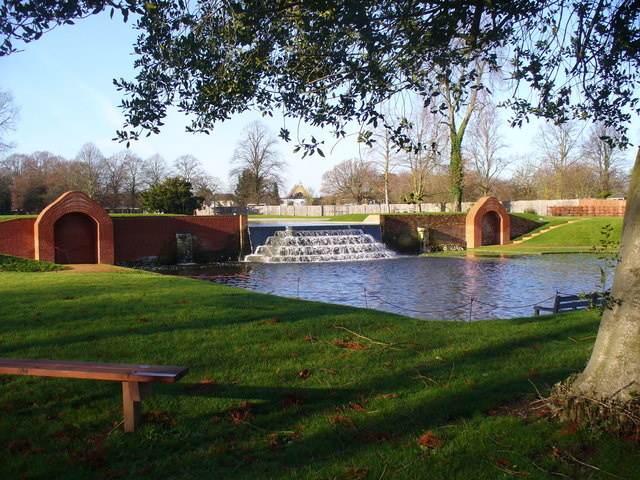
Cascade and lower pond showing both stoop basins and both alcoves

The Upper Lodge Water Gardens are a partially restored complex of early eighteenth century water gardens with garden canals in Bushy Park, near London. Originally built for Charles Montagu, 1st Earl of Halifax between 1709 and 1715 when he was ranger of Bushy Park and lived in Upper Lodge, they fell into disuse over subsequent centuries, but part of the complex was restored in the early 21st century and opened to the public in 2009.

The complex originally ran for 960 metres across the park from the entry point of the Longford River (now the Pantile bridge) in the Hampton Hill end of Bushy Park to what is now the National Physical Laboratory (NPL) in Teddington.

The two ends of the complex remain in Bushy Park as part of the route of the Longford river and the canal plantation. the central sections were modified or even filled in, and the Upper Lodge they were built for was rebuilt in 1840. The Octagonal Upper pond and, the lower pond and the cascade that separate them were restored and are now open to the public. Another restored pond lies in the private gardens of Upper Lodge.

The partial restoration was part of a major £7,200,000 refurbishment of Bushy Park, of which about 60% came from the Heritage Lottery Fund.

== Gallery ==
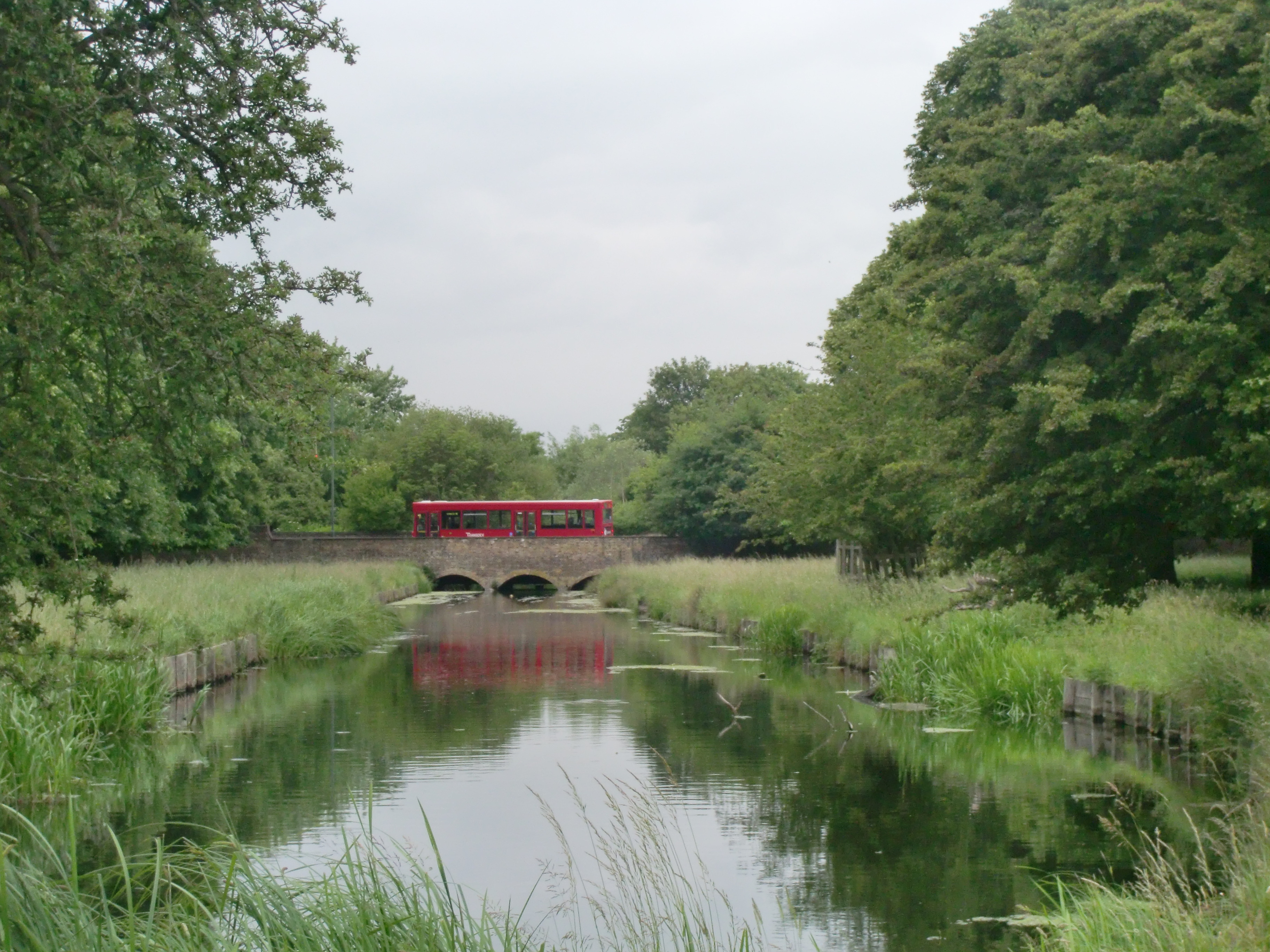
View up the Longford away from the upper pond.

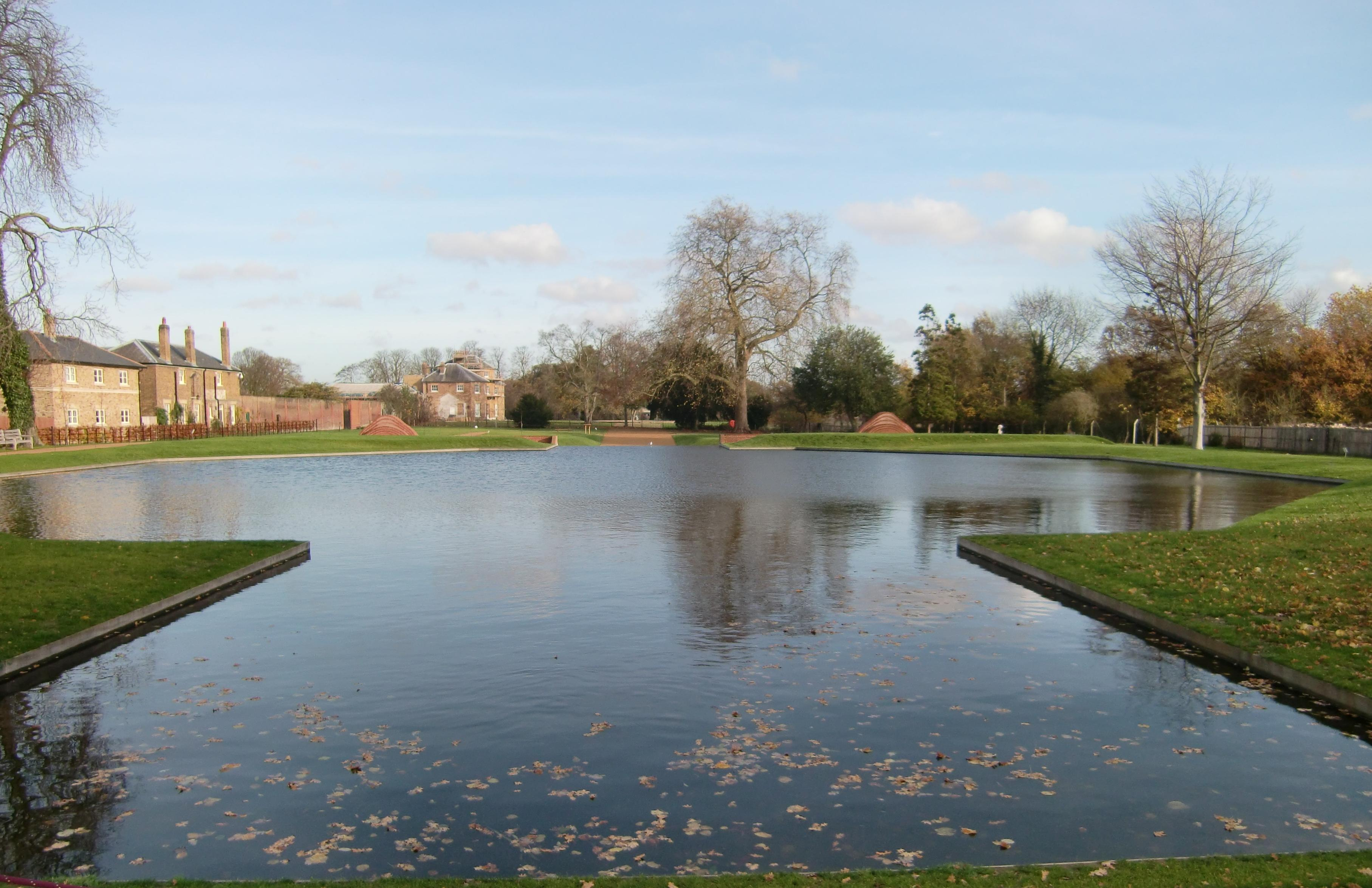
Upper pond looking towards the NPL. The Victorian Mews is on the left and Upper Lodge centre left. The tops of the alcoves are visible to either side of the gap where the Upper pond flows over the cascade

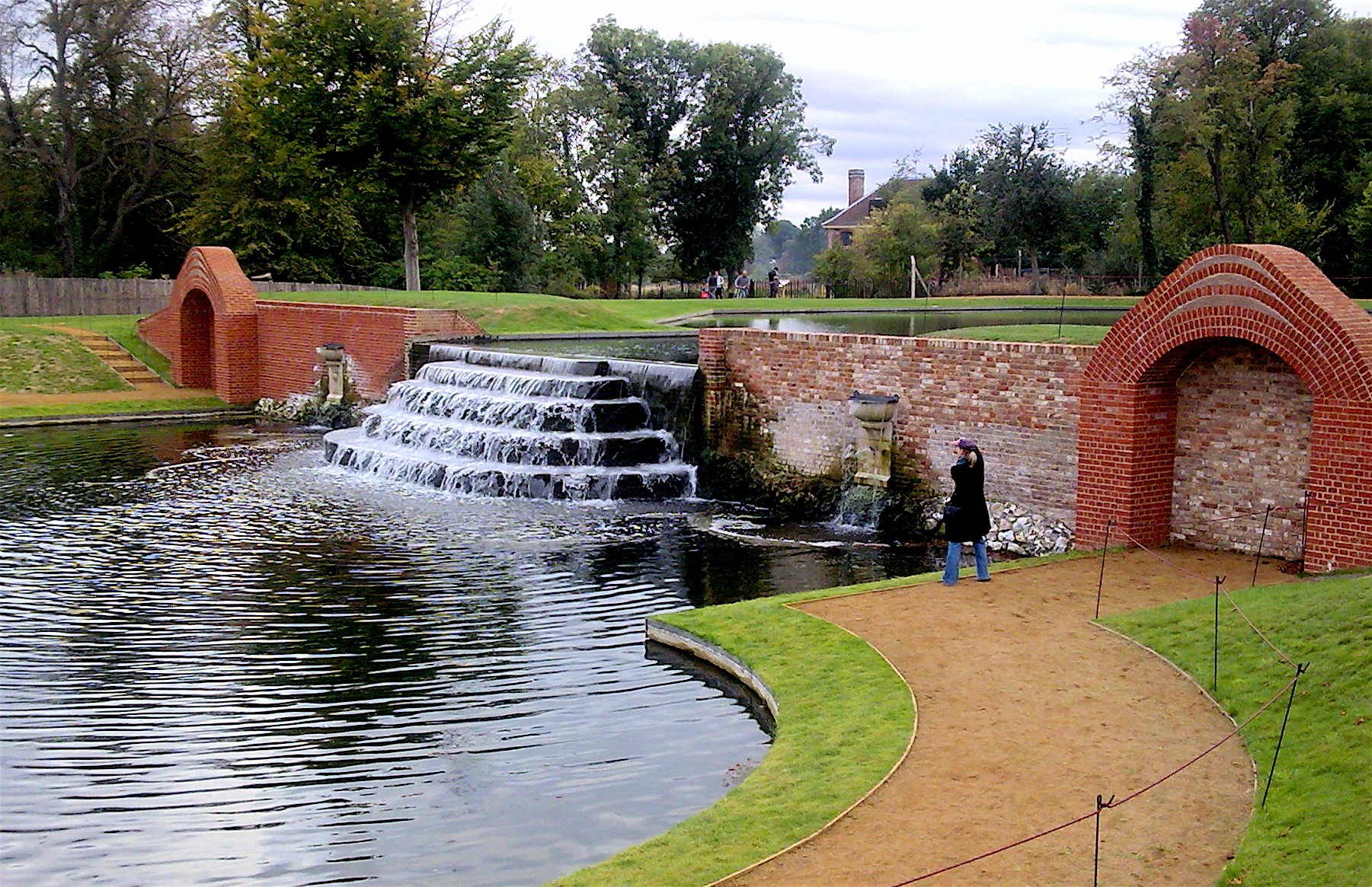
The cascade, stoop basins and alcoves

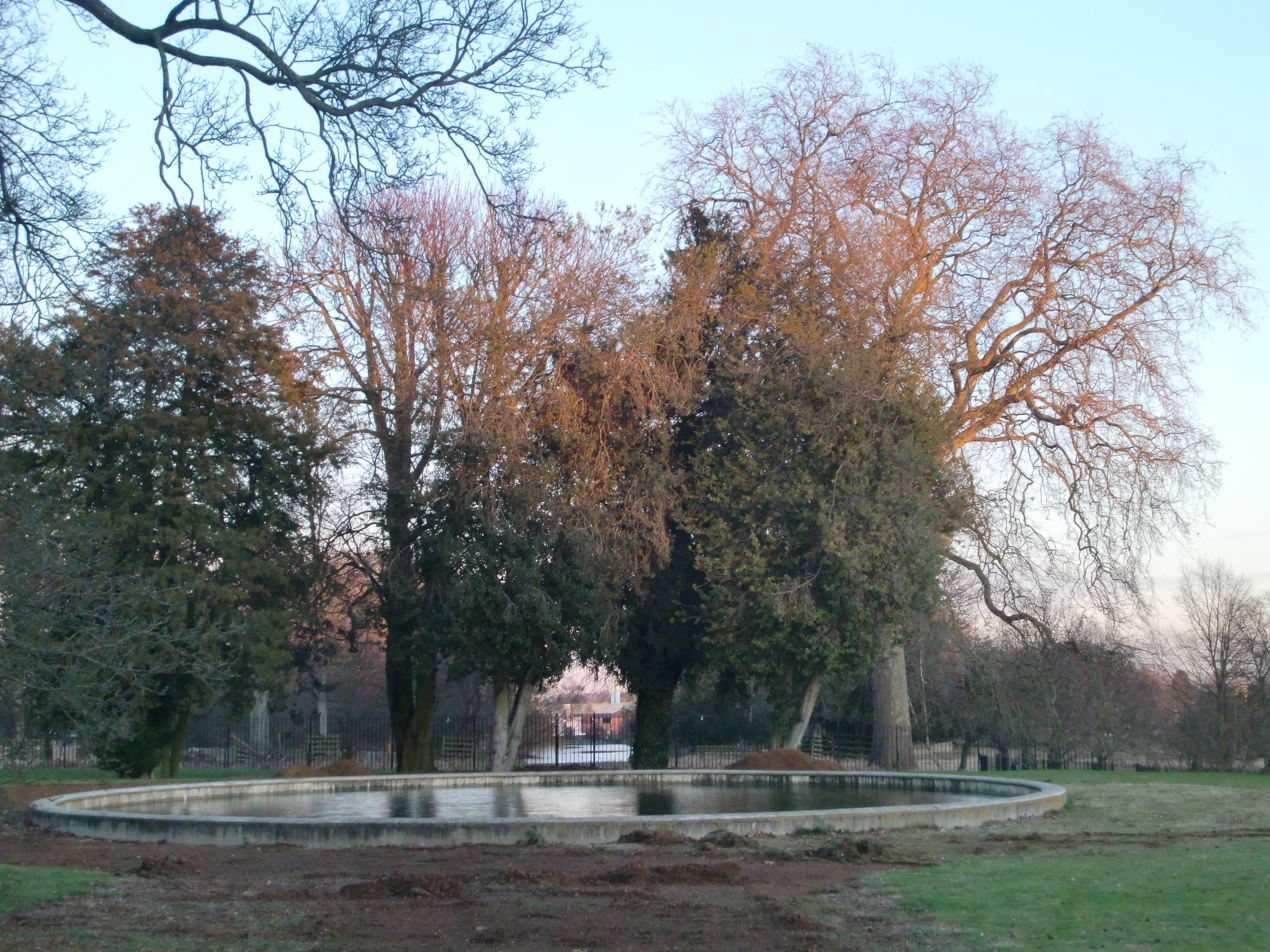
Vista through Upper Lodge garden to the canal plantation and the NPL

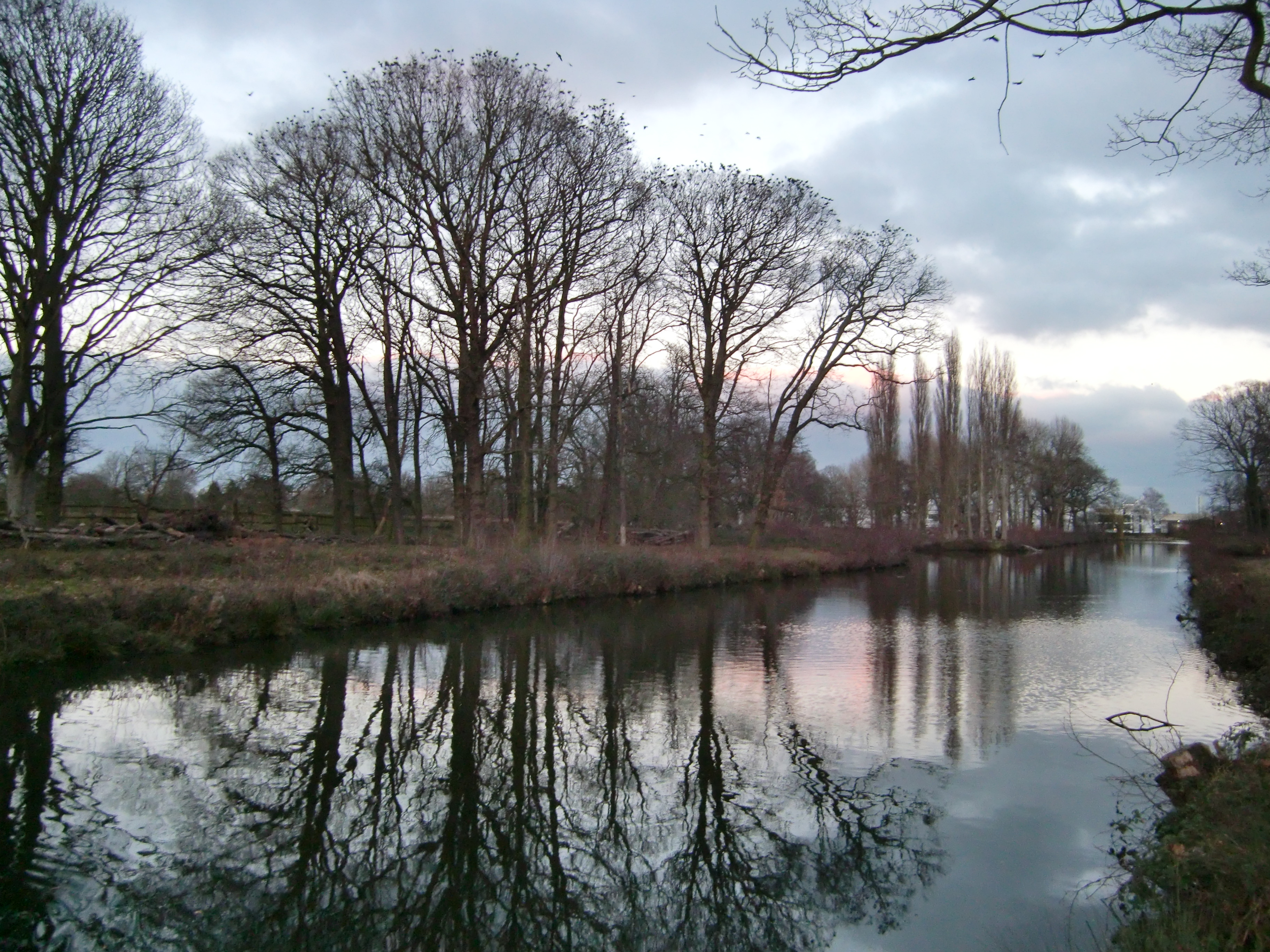
The Canal plantation continues the line almost to the Teddington boundary of the Park
