= Canal (garden history) =

Formal water feature in gardens

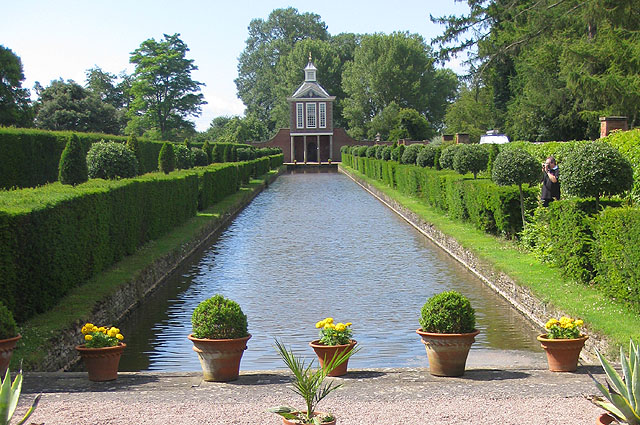
The "Main Canal" at Westbury Court Garden, now restored to its putative state in about 1720. It is 137 metres (449 ft) long.

In the history of gardening and landscaping, a canal is a relatively large piece of water that has a very regular shape, usually long, thin and rectangular. The peak period for garden canals was the 17th and 18th centuries, by the end of which less formal water features were in favour, in the style of the English landscape garden. It is distinguished from a garden pond or lake by its shape, and typically falls somewhere between the two in area. It might be wholly artificial, created by diverting and damming a stream, or based around a natural water feature which is landscaped. Usually it appears to be enclosed, though in fact water passes in and out by channels below the surface. The edges are often walled, and the water relatively shallow.

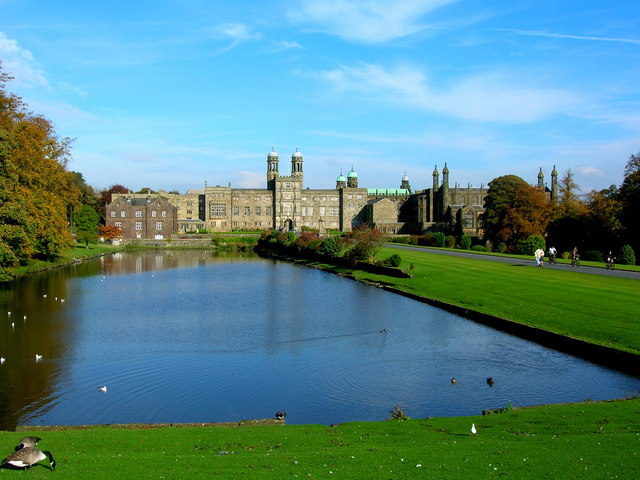
One of a pair of matching canals, c. 1710, framing the entrance drive of Stonyhurst College; the other is out of sight at right.

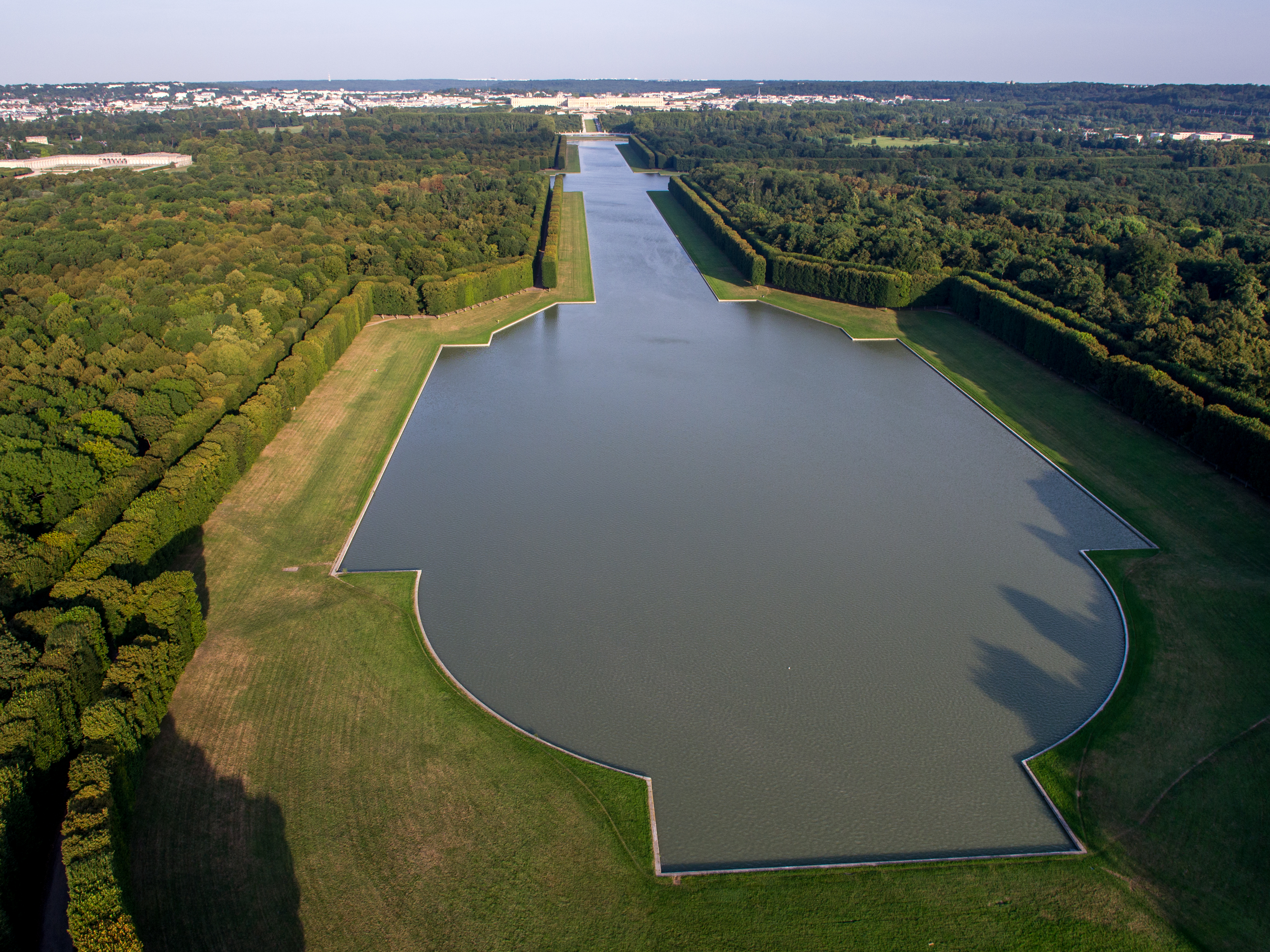
The Grand Canal in the Gardens of Versailles, 1662–68, seen from the far end, with the palace in the distance. This main branch is 1585 metres long and 122 wide. The cross-branches disappear behind trees.

Traditionally, in England the canal has been associated with the Dutch garden style of the later 17th century, especially from about 1690 to 1720, though this has been challenged in recent years. There was also a tradition of canals in the French formal garden style, culminating in the huge four-armed Grand Canal that dominates the bottom of the Gardens of Versailles, made in 1662–68, the main branch 1585 metres long and 122 wide.

A detailed study of canals in Suffolk found evidence of 56 in the county, some previously thought to be fragments of a moat or "mere ponds"; "Amazingly, in view of the received wisdom about the scarcity of surviving canals nationally, a high proportion of these are still recognisable and water-filled". Analysis of the proportions of these showed that nearly half were between 5 and 10 times as long as they were wide, with the next largest groups (10 or 11 each) those with ratios of 1 to 5, and then 10 to 15. Most were between 50 and 100 metres long, but two were 460 and 300 metres. A few use a tapering shape to give (from one end) an impression of being longer than they actually are. Some had or have islands, others cascades into them.

Apart from being a highly prestigious, because expensive, ornament to a garden, and a pleasant place to walk, canals had some practical uses. A large stock of water near the house may have been useful for watering the garden and other household purposes; some houses had special "dipping pools" for the gardeners and servants to take water from. Many canals were stocked with fish, and they attracted edible waterfowl, who could nest safely if there was an island. Boats of an appropriate size could be taken out, and the Earl of Bristol nearly drowned at Ickworth House in 1717, when he was in "imminent danger from being some time under water in my new-made canal here, with the boate (out of which I fell topsy-turvy) driven by the wind over my head". He may have been fishing with a rod, by now a popular leisure activity. Louis XIV famously staged mock naval battles on the Grand Canal at Versailles. Canals were made during the Little Ice Age, and allowed ice skating during the winter, as well as swimming in summer.

== History ==
Connections to the very long history of long and thin formal water features in gardens elsewhere have not been clearly demonstrated. Setting ancient gardens aside, these have been a strong feature of the Persian garden and Islamic gardens generally, with some found in Islamic Spain. The very small example in the Generalife, part of the Alhambra, Granada, Spain, is famous. In France, there were examples at Fleury-en-Bière, not far from Paris, in the 16th century, and at the nearby Palace of Fontainebleau by 1609. Numerous others can be seen in the prints of great houses in France by Jacques I Androuet du Cerceau (d. 1584). The medieval garden in England, as elsewhere in Europe, had a long tradition of moats, fishponds, and "decorative meres".

=== England ===
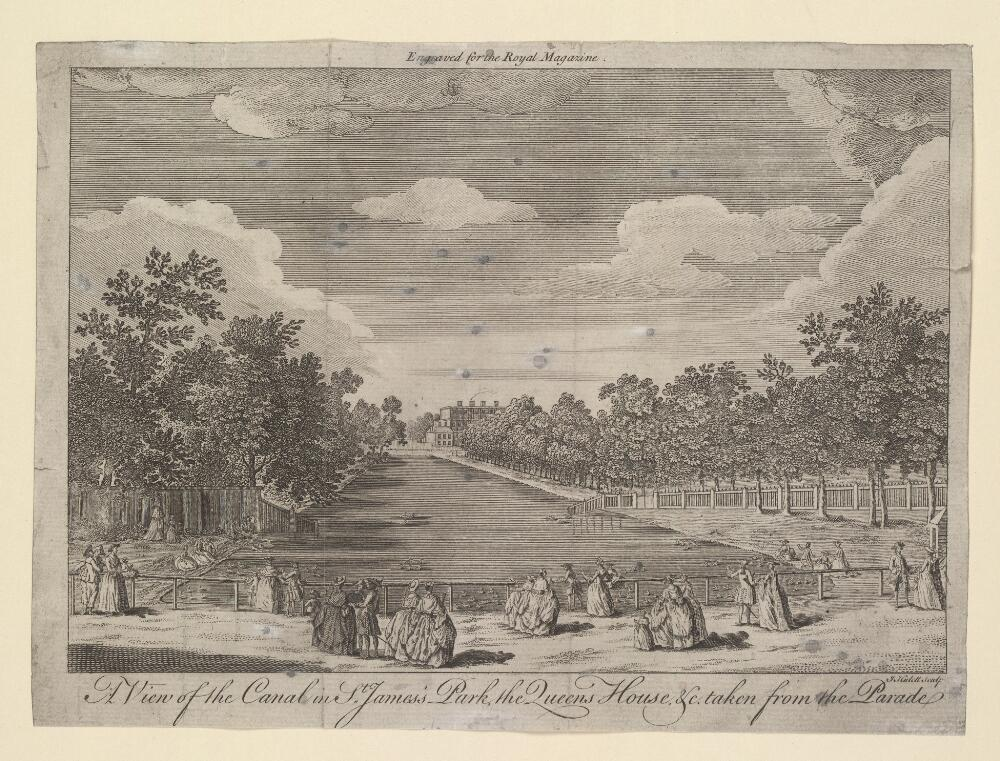
View of the Canal in St. James's Park, the Queen's House etc., taken from the Parade, 1771

A "canal-like feature" was created for Baptist Hicks, 1st Viscount Campden at Chipping Campden before 1629, but the English history of the garden canal really begins with the English Restoration of 1660, when Charles II and his loyal courtiers returned from an exile mostly spent in the Netherlands, or in France. Although not especially interested in gardens, Charles asked Louis XIV to allow him to borrow his chief gardener and landscaper, André Le Nôtre, apparently to advise on Hampton Court Palace and the planned palace at Greenwich in particular. Permission was given, but Le Nôtre never made the journey, and André Mollet and his brother Claude came instead. André Mollet had worked for both of Charles' parents, and had paid visits to England since the 1620s.

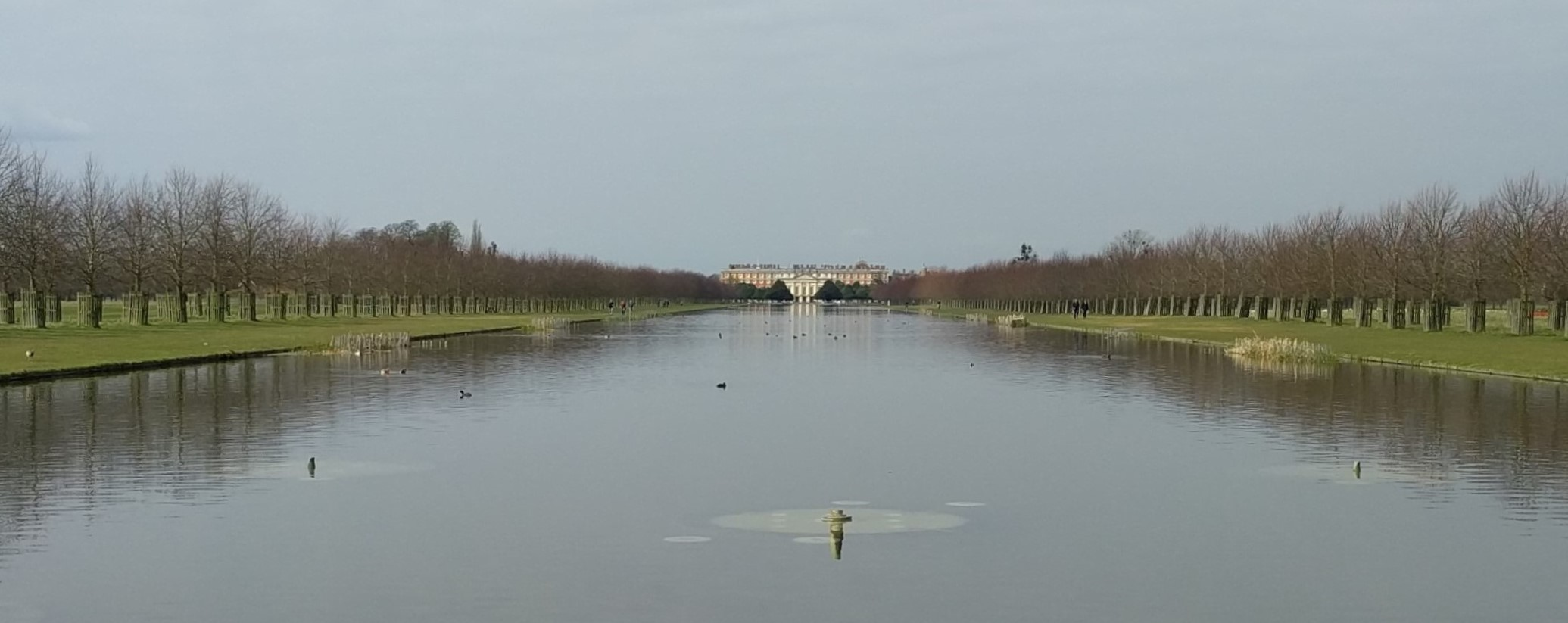
Hampton Court Palace seen in the distance from the end of the "Long Water" in Hampton Court Park

The Mollets were responsible for a canal in what is now St James's Park in Westminster, and the large "Long Canal" (now usually "Long Water") at Hampton Court; the "first long canals to be built in England". Of these, the very long and thin canal (775-metre by 38-metre, or 850 by 42-yards) in St James's was later expanded and remodelled into the current lake, with some filled in to allow for an expansion of Horse Guard's Parade. This was mostly done by John Nash in the 1820s for the Prince Regent. The Hampton Court one remains intact, with a narrow semi-circle added at the palace end by William III in 1699. William III was interested in gardening, and is usually credited with adding to the influence of Dutch gardens on England.

Others soon followed the royal lead, for example at Wrest Park in Bedfordshire, where the "Long Water", "Broad Water" and "Ladies Lake" have managed to survive a makeover by Capability Brown in the 18th century. Wrest Park was done by George London and his partner Henry Wise, the leading English designers of the day, for Henry Grey, 1st Duke of Kent in the 1700s.

The Dutch engravers Jan Kip's and Leonard Knijff's aerial perspective views in various prints and books culminating in Britannia Illustrata, or Views of Several of the Queens Palaces also of the Principal Seats of the Nobility and Gentry of Great Britain, published in London in 1709 and later in an expanded French edition, shows many leading houses and their gardens at a point near the peak of the trend, which really "took hold" in the 1690s. They must sometimes be treated with a certain caution, as showing what was planned rather than what had actually been constructed. King George I, while still only Elector of Hanover, had excavated a long thin canal running around the edge of the Herrenhausen Gardens outside Hanover on the three sides away from the palace, which remains. Generally, leaders in taste began moving away from very formal garden designs in the 1720s. The Serpentine in Hyde Park in London, a royal project of the 1730s, was one of the earliest artificial lakes designed to appear natural, with an irregular curving shape.

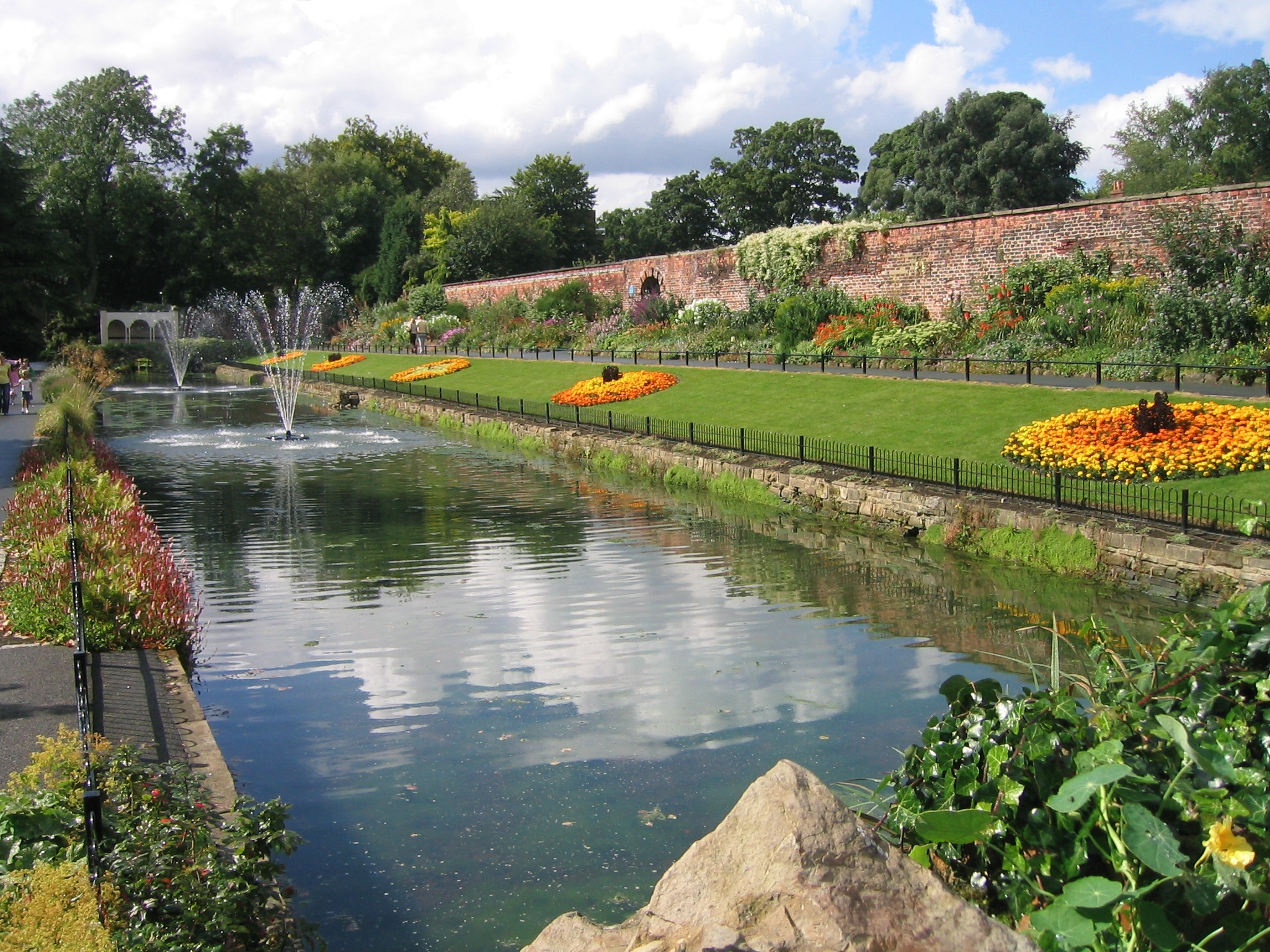
The Canal Gardens, Roundhay Park in Leeds, 1833, an early revival.

A number of more regular serpentine canals were dug "from the late 1720s", following a fashion established for garden paths and walks some years before. One at Longleat House was so adapted in 1736-37.

By 1771, Horace Walpole, a vocal enthusiast for the new English landscape garden style, thought the Wrest Park gardens "very ugly in the old-fashioned manner with high hedges and canals", and few new canals were being constructed (one excavated in 1759 is mentioned as exceptionally late). Many were converted to more natural-seeming shapes; for example the canal at Culford Park in Suffolk was described as "new" in 1698, but in 1795 was filled in to create a larger lake, crossing it at right angles.

In the next century there was a revival in more formal gardens, with the influential garden designer and writer John Claudius Loudon a significant figure. Shorter and fatter canals began to be built, often featuring the many varieties of water-lilies that were available by then. They tended to be placed as the centre of a thickly-planted flower garden, rather than being flanked by regular avenues of trees, as the larger original ones often were. The "Canal Gardens" at Roundhay Park in Leeds are an early example of this, constructed in 1833 when the park was still a large private garden. The canal is still long, at 350 feet (107 m) by 34 feet (10 m). The "Jellicoe Canal" at the RHS Garden Wisley, with a large collection of water-lilies, dates to the 1970s.

== Placement and shapes ==
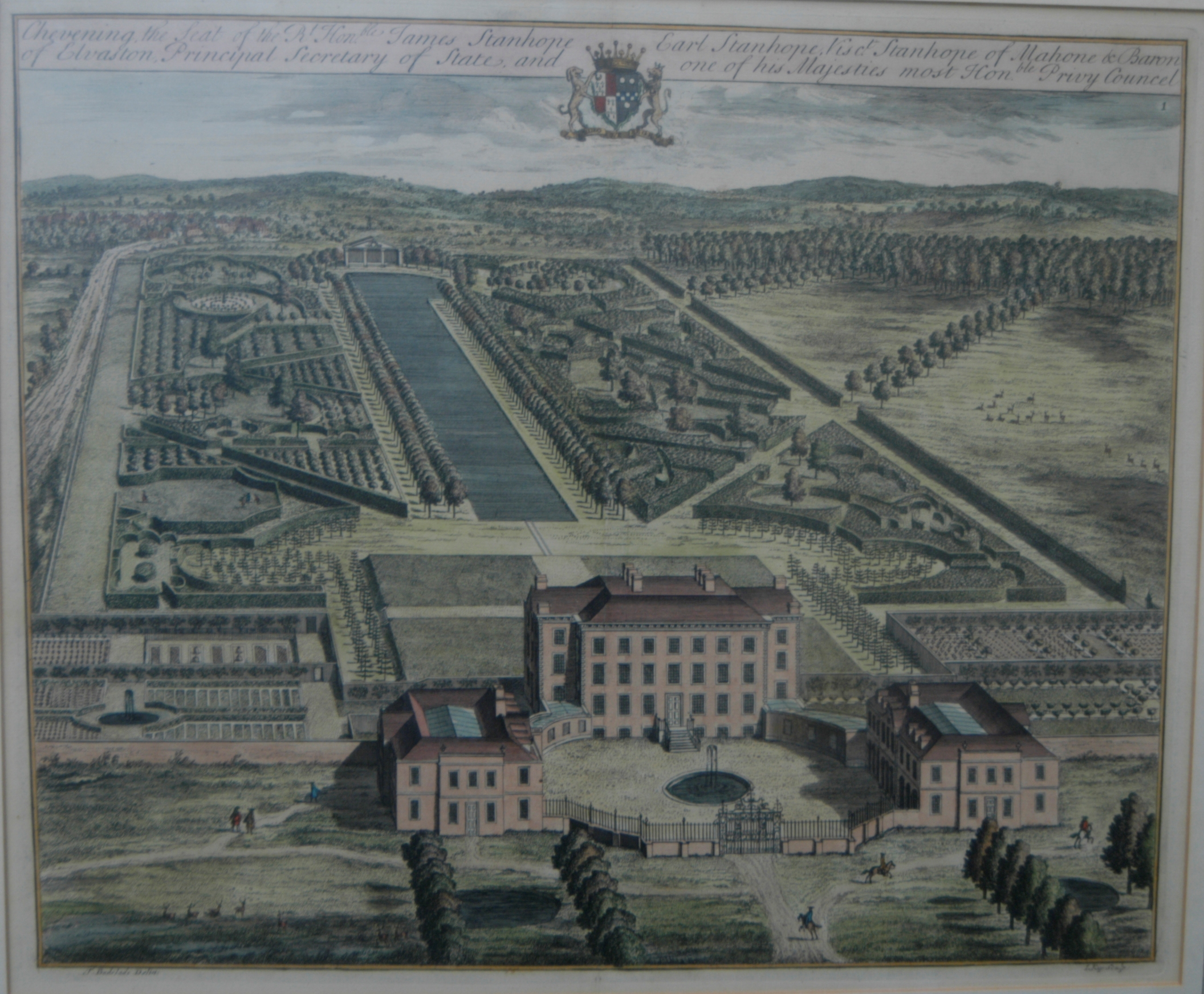
Jan Kip, Chevening, 1719, lined by avenues of young trees, with a bulging rounded end forming a "bason".

The classic placement of a canal was at right-angles to the centre of the garden front (normally the rear), allowing uninterrupted views to and from the house. This was followed at Versailles, Hampton Court, Wrest Park and most other houses. Some canals were at right angles to the facade, but offset to one side, and others parallel to the facade. This cut off the house from the garden beyond the canal unless there were bridges, which were rare. At Longleat, with a sloping site, the "first big commission" of London and Wise, the effect of a canal was achieved by a series of connected pieces of water of different sizes and shapes running parallel to the main garden facade (in fact at the side) quite near the house. These ran under several bridges of different sizes, and down cascades, so that a walk in the garden is little impeded. Various other arrangements are found, some dictated by the site, or the reuse of a pre-existing feature such as a moat. Some houses had more than one canal, typically parallel, as at Stonyhurst, but not always.

Most canals were strictly rectangles, though of greatly varying proportions, but there were some deviations, though very few shapes as complicated as at Versailles. At Chevening the far end had a curving bulge at one side only, and at Westbury Court there is a T-shaped canal. At Hampton Court Charles II's Long Canal was expanded by William III, at the palace end, with much narrower curved branches, with bridges, running round the outside of the semi-circle of parterres of his new "Great Fountain Garden", and then parallel to the palace facade.

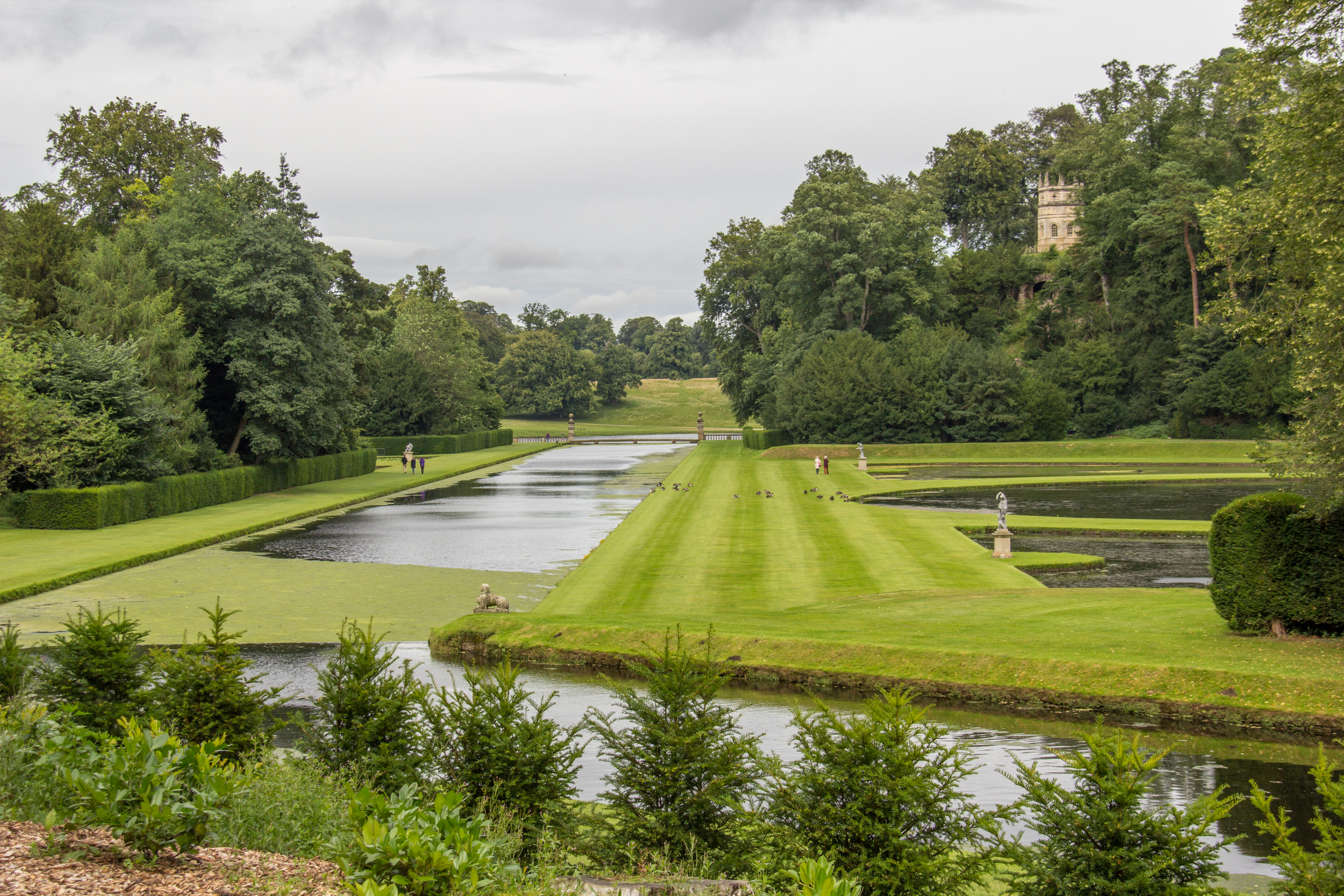
Section of the canalized river at Studley Royal

At Studley Royal in Yorkshire, where John Aislabie, Chancellor of the Exchequer during the South Sea Bubble, retreated in disgrace (after a period in the Tower), the extensive water gardens do not include a canal on a strict definition, as the small River Skell was used as it passed through the grounds, including "canalizing" it in two straightened sections. There is no attempt to create an axis relative to the house, or indeed among the elements of water. The Upper Lodge Water Gardens in Bushy Park, opposite Hampton Court Palace, was another scheme using the Longford River, created for the palace's canals, made in 1709-15, and recently partly restored.

== Skating ==
Ice skating on metal skates seems to have arrived in England at the same time as the garden canal, with the English Restoration in 1660. In London St James's Park was the main centre until the 19th century. Both Samuel Pepys and John Evelyn, the two leading diarists of the day, saw it on the "new canal" there on 1 December 1662, the first time Pepys had ever seen it ("a very pretty art"). Then it was "performed before their Majesties and others, by diverse gentlemen and others, with scheets after the manner of the Hollanders". Two weeks later, on 15 December 1662, Pepys accompanied the Duke of York, later King James II, on a skating outing: "To the Duke, and followed him in the Park, when, though the ice was broken, he would go slide upon his skates, which I did not like; but he slides very well." In 1711 Jonathan Swift still thinks the sport might be unfamiliar to his "Stella": "Delicate walking weather; and the Canal and Rosamund's Pond full of the rabble and with skates, if you know what that is.

== The Versailles Grand Canal flotilla ==
The Grand Canal at Versailles remained exceptional in its size, and as a metaphor for Louis XIV's power. As part of this, a flotilla of naval and pleasure craft was planned for it from the time of construction. These came to include 14 gondolas, some built on site and others presented (with gondoliers) by the Republic of Venice, small rowing boats, and reduced-sized warships, both oar-powered galleys and sailing ships. Various of these took part in staged mock-battles. By the 1670s buildings had been built to house the 260 men working on the flotilla, who at times included enslaved "Moors".

== Gallery ==
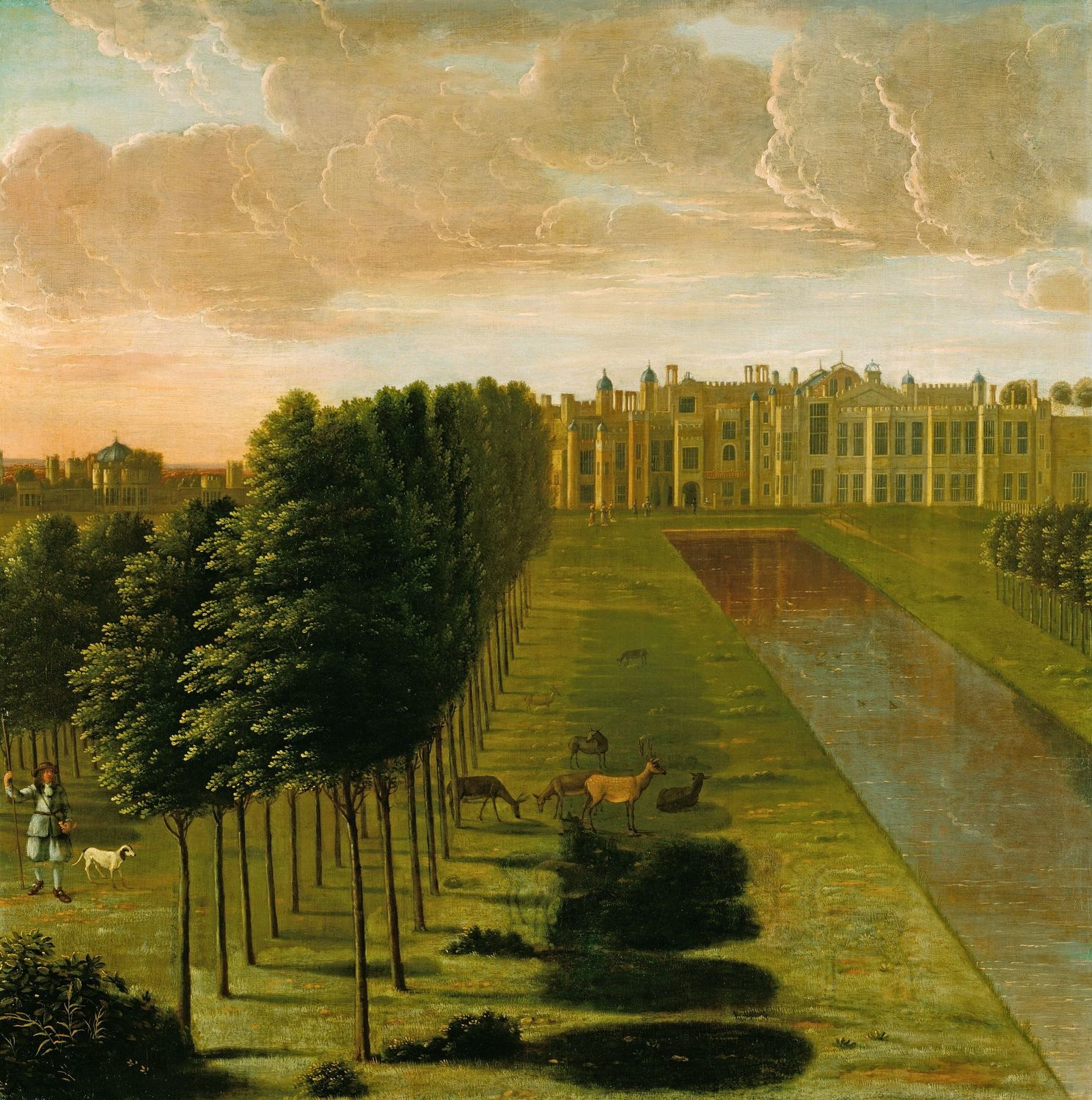
Hendrick Danckerts, the Hampton Court "Long Canal" when new, c. 1665, Royal Collection.

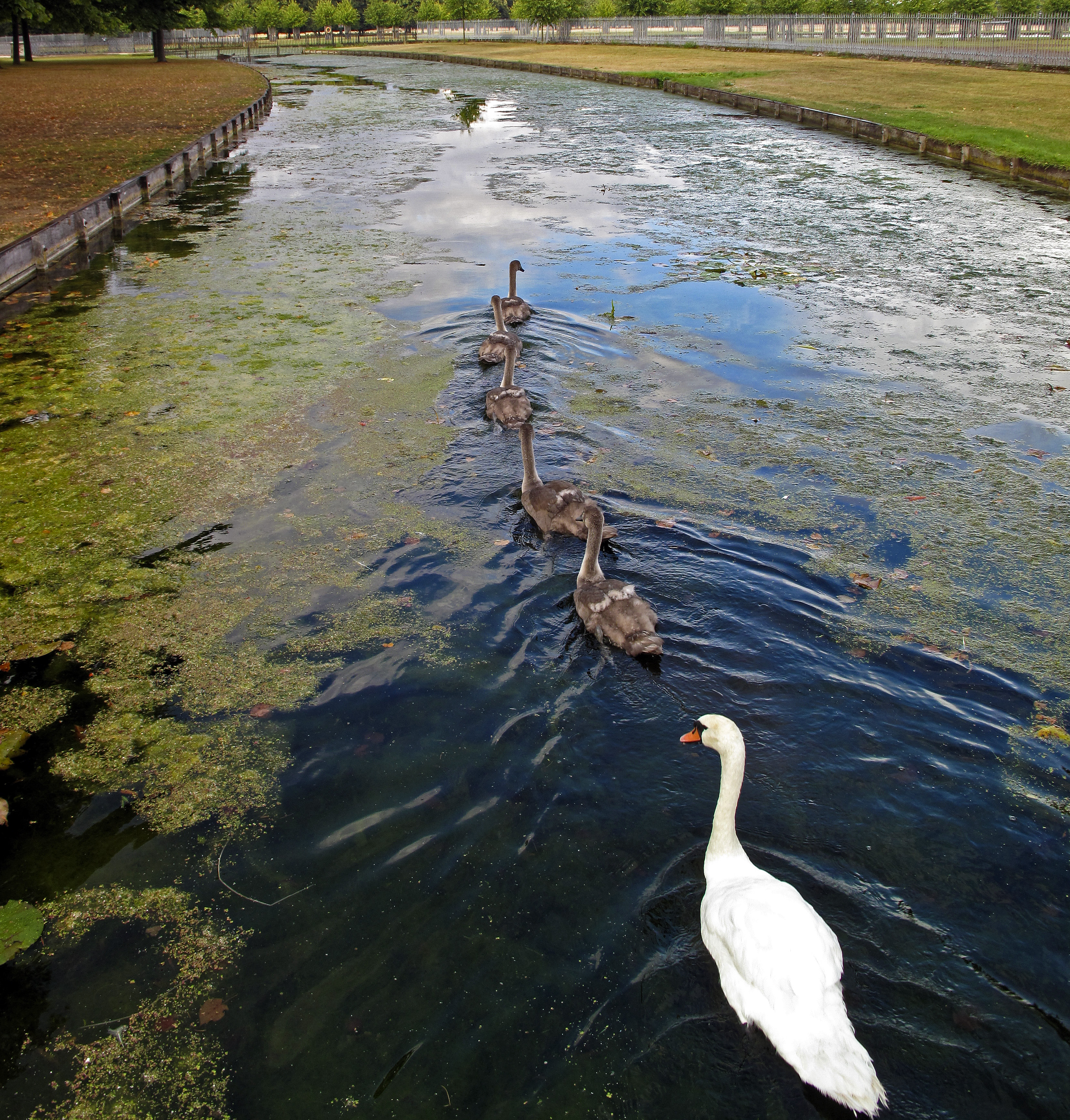
Swans on William III's curving extension of the Hampton Court "Long Canal"

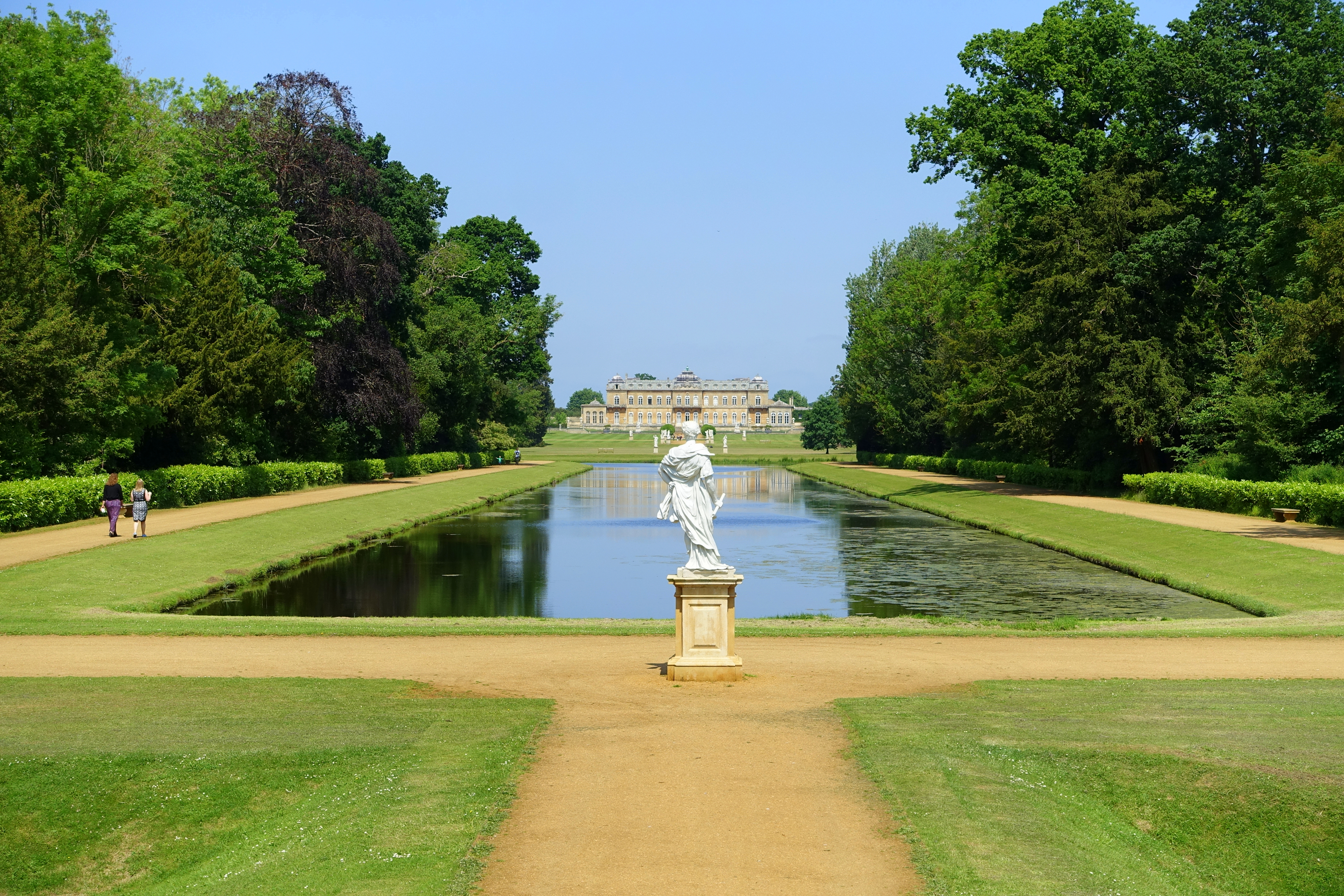
"Long Water", Wrest Park, Bedfordshire, 1700s

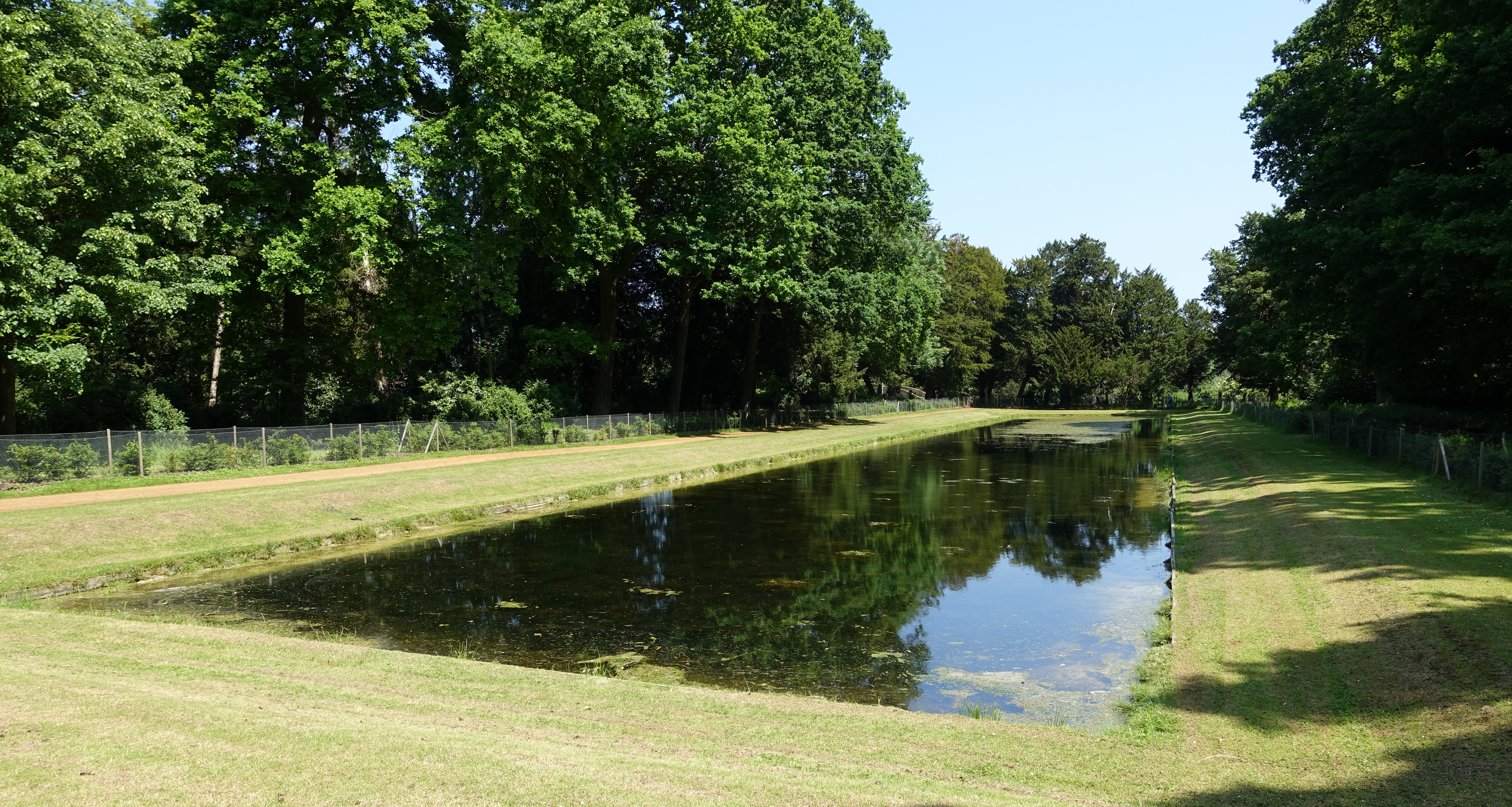
"Ladies Lake", Wrest Park, Bedfordshire

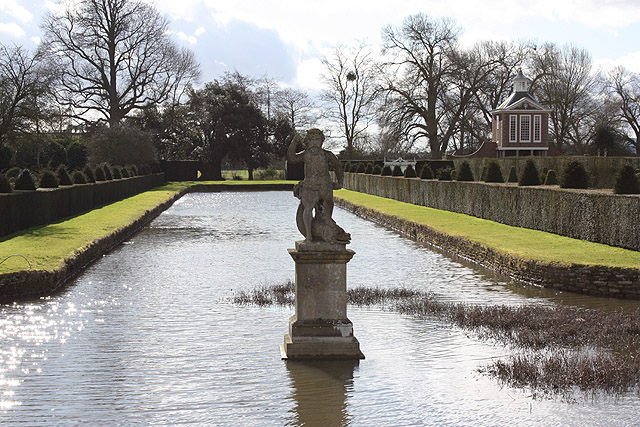
The junction of the T-shaped canal at Westbury Court Garden, lying parallel to the "main canal" shown above.

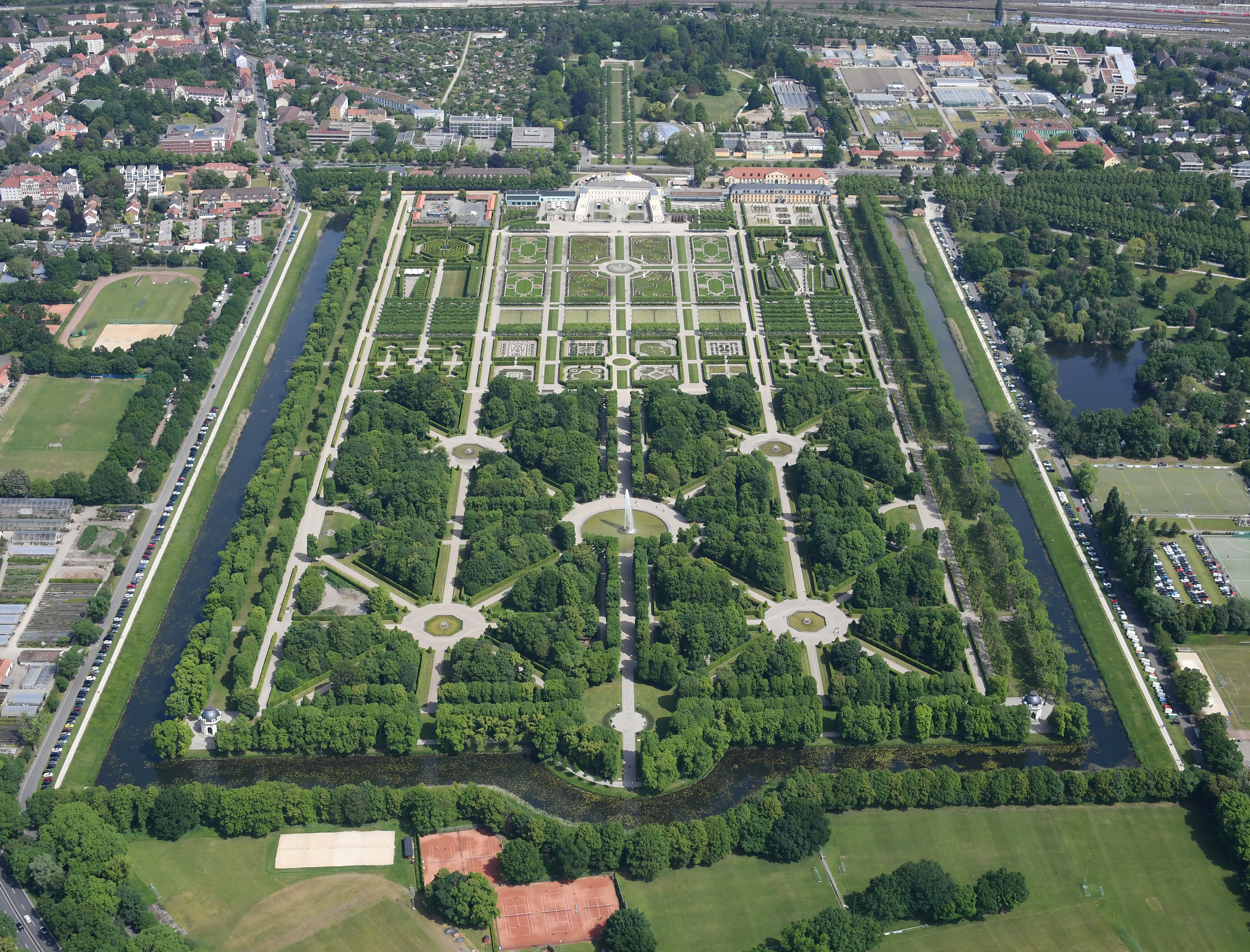
The Herrenhausen Gardens in Hanover, canal by Sophia of Hanover, mother of George I, round three sides

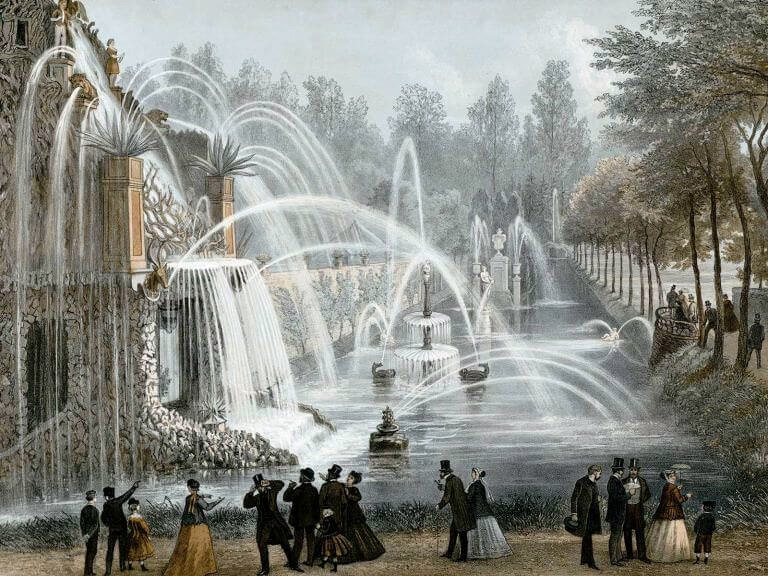
Extravagant waterworks at Vaeshartelt Castle, Meerssen, Netherlands, c 1860.

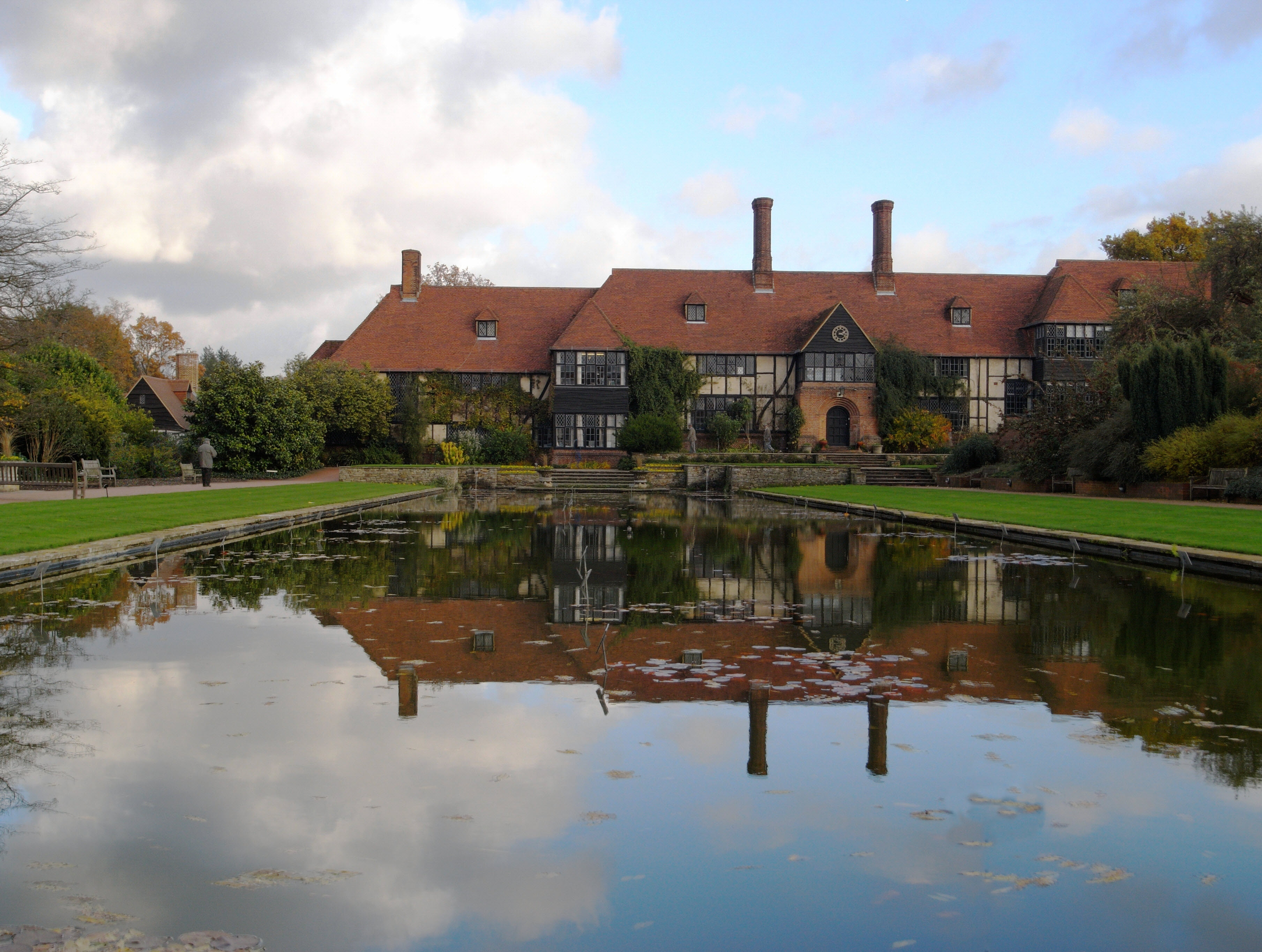
"Jellicoe Canal" at the RHS Garden Wisley, 1970s
