= Prinsentuin (Groningen) =

Renaissance-style garden in the Netherlands

Coordinates: 53°13′18″N 6°34′08″E

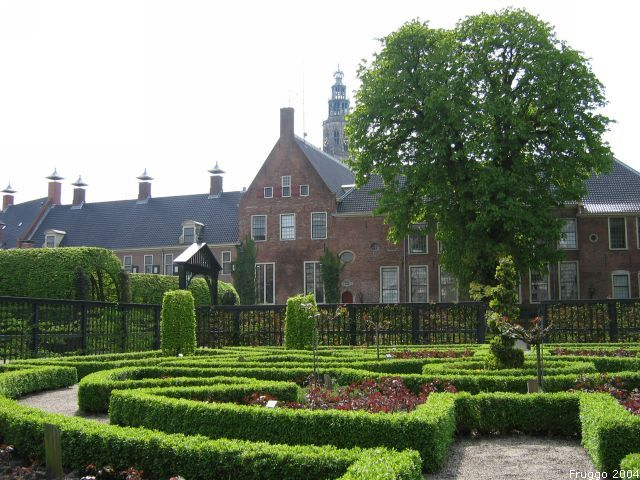
Detail of the Prinsentuin - left: berceaus and the Martinitoren on the background

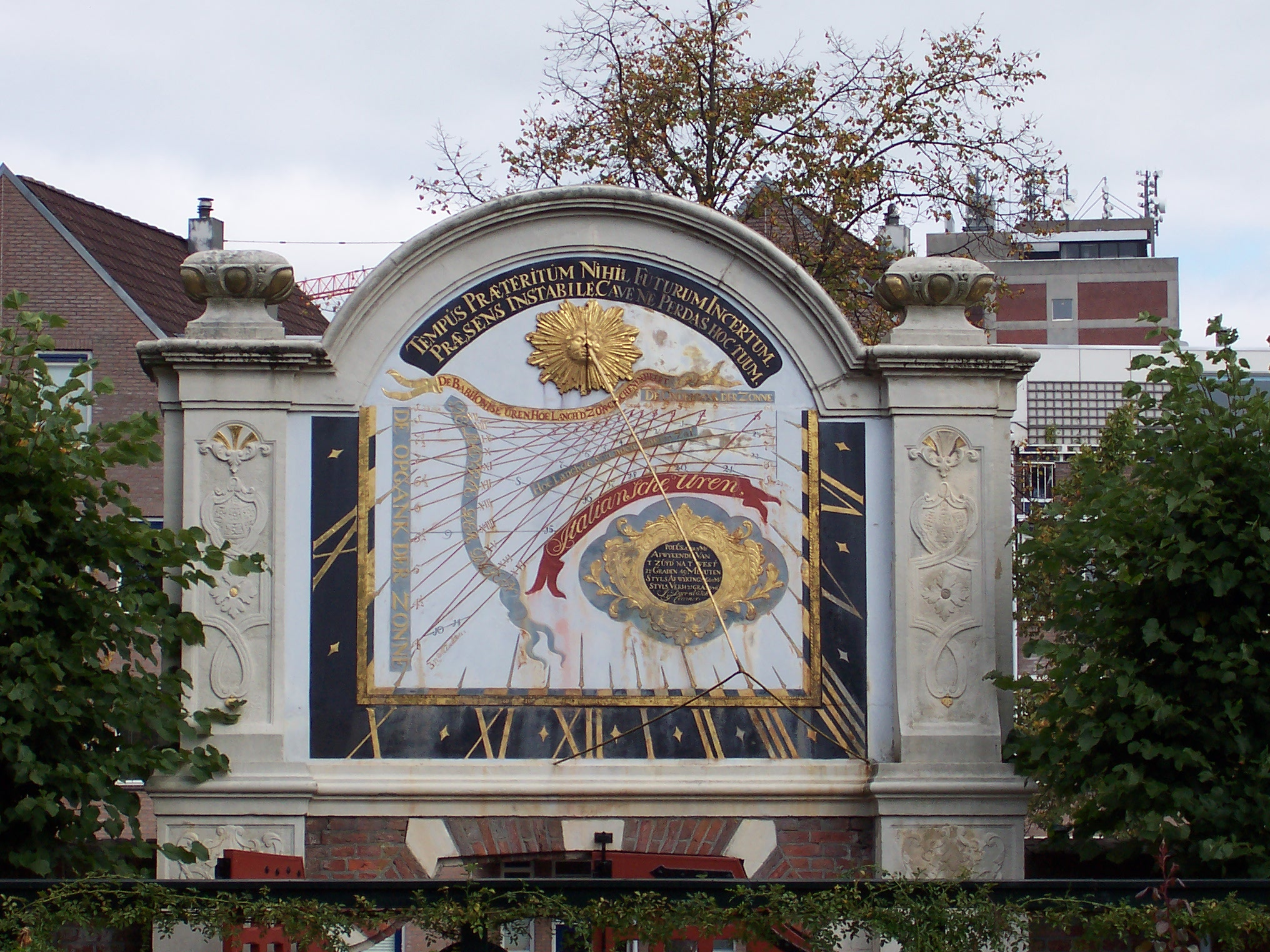
The sundial of the Prinsentuin

The Prinsentuin (English: Prince's garden) or Prinsenhoftuin is a garden built in renaissance style that is located in Groningen, behind the Prinsenhof. The Garden consists of a rose garden, a herb garden, a part with berceaus and a sundial on the wall above the entrance.

The letters 'W' and 'A', the beginletters of stadtholder Willem Frederik of Nassau and his wife Countess Albertine Agnes of Nassau, are planted in the Prinsentuin to, using hedges.

On the side of the Turfsingel the garden is fenced off by a high wall. On one side you can still see a bit of the blu wall, that once stood optop of this wall. The blue wall, That was attached in the French period, had to avoid that people threw drinks over the wall when the Prinsenhof was a militair hospital. Nowadays a tea house is settled in the building.

The Prinsentuin is also known because of the annual event Dichters in de Prinsentuin (English: Poets in the Prinsentuin), where known and unknown poets read out their poems in the open air.
