= Jan Kip =

Draughtsman, engraver and print dealer from the Northern Netherlands (c.1652-1722)

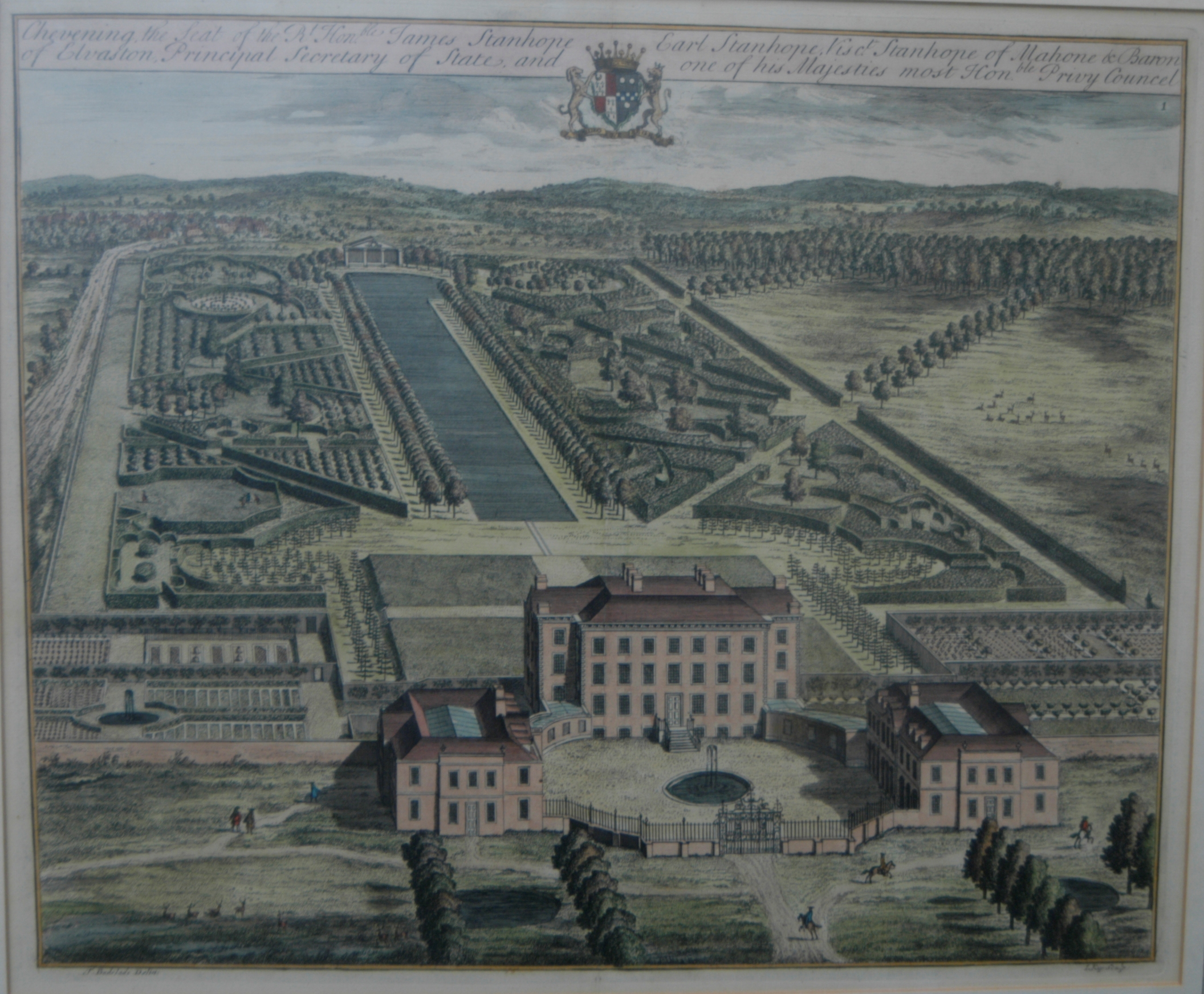
Kip's engraving of Chevening, Kent, with a large garden canal, published in 1719.

Johannes "Jan" Kip (1652/53 in Amsterdam – 1722 in Westminster) was a Dutch draftsman, engraver and print dealer. Together with Leonard Knyff, he made a speciality of engraved views of English country houses.

== Life ==
Jan Kip was born in Amsterdam in 1653.

He trained as an engraver under the printmaker Bastiaen Stopendaal between 1668 and 1670. After completing his apprenticeship he established himself independently as a printmaker; his earliest dated engravings are known from 1672.

In April 1680, at the age of twenty-seven, Kip married Elisabeth Breda in Amsterdam.

== Career ==
After producing works for the court of William of Orange in Amsterdam, Kip followed William and Mary to London and settled in St. John Street in Farringdon, where he conducted a thriving printselling business.

He also worked for various London publishers producing engravings after such artists as Francis Barlow (c. 1626–1704) and Caius Gabriel Cibber (1630–1700), largely for book illustrations. He made several engraved plates for Awnsham & John Churchill's A Collection of Voyages & Travels (first published 1704). He signed the African scenes in volume V of the 1732 edition as "J. Kip".

His most important works were the large fold-out folio illustrations for Britannia Illustrata, 1708; for the 65 folio plates he engraved for the antiquary Sir Robert Atkyns, The Ancient and Present State of Glostershire, 1712 (1st edition); and for Le Nouveau Théâtre de la Grande Bretagne ou description exacte des palais de la Reine, et des Maisons les plus considerables des des Seigneurs & des Gentilshommes de la Grande Bretagne, 1715, an extended reprint in collaboration with other artists.

== Partnership with Leonard Knyff ==
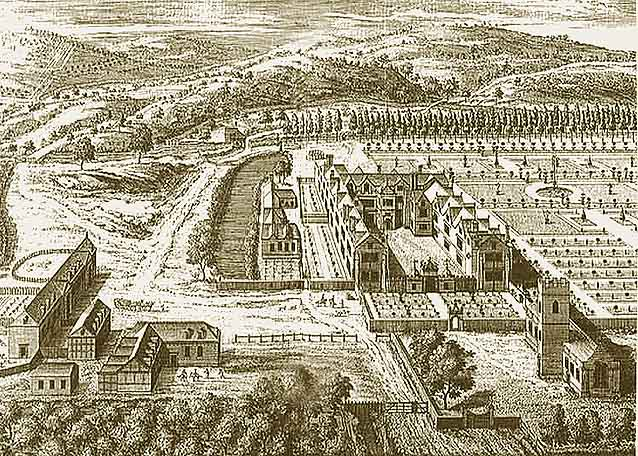
Not all the gentlemen's seats were as up-to-date as Hampton Court: many-gabled Jacobean Toddington Manor, with the remnant of its moat, its parish church and half-timbered outbuildings contrasted with its fine, brand-new formal garden.

The linked careers of Jan Kip and Leonard Knyff made a specialty of engraved views of English country houses, typically represented in detail from a bird's-eye perspective, a pictorial approach used in topographical illustration. Knyff supplied the drawings, which Kip translated into engraved plates.

Their major work was Britannia Illustrata, a collection of engraved views showing royal palaces and the country houses of Britain’s nobility and gentry. First issued in London in 1707, it included 80 copperplate engravings and was expanded in later editions published in 1708–09.

The volume presents detailed views of estates across Great Britain. Buildings are shown with careful attention to their structure, while the surrounding landscapes are clearly laid out. Formal gardens, parterres, and straight avenues are depicted alongside wooded areas, fields, and estate grounds. Garden paths, gates, and outbuildings are included, and many scenes show figures, horses, and carriages, as well as boats on nearby waterways. Some plates are composed using a "map perspective," combining an elevated viewpoint with plan-like detail, in keeping with traditions of topographical representation in the Low Countries.
