= David Jacques =

David Lawson Jacques is a British garden historian. He specializes in landscape conservation and the history of 17th and 18th century gardens. He was prominent in the campaign to have cultural landscapes admitted to the World Heritage List in 1992, and served on the ICOMOS World Heritage Panel 2020-1 and 2022-3.

Jacques was appointed Officer of the Order of the British Empire (OBE) in the 2022 Birthday Honours for services to garden history and conservation.

== Career ==
Jacques was at Wellington College, Berkshire, from 1962 to 1967, then studied engineering at Leeds University, followed by landscape architecture at the University of Sheffield. His doctorate from the Courtauld Institute of Art, on English formal gardens, followed much later (c. 1990), after he had established a career as a consultant, author, and from 1987 English Heritage's first permanent inspector of parks and gardens.

He was Chairman of the Garden History Society’s Conservation Committee from 1996, then Chairman of the Society from 1998 to 2000. Jacques was also a Trustee of the Landscape Design Trust (publisher of journals in the landscape design world) from 1994 until 2018.

Jacques was a Trustee of the Chiswick House & Gardens Trust from its founding in 2005 until 2019; he had already been a consultant there from 1983 and involved through English Heritage.

== Books ==
- Georgian Gardens: The Reign of Nature (Batsfords, 1983)
- The Gardens of William and Mary (Christopher Helm, 1978)
- Essential to the Pracktick Part of Phisick: The London Apothecaries 1540-1617 (Honourable Society of Apothecaries of London, 1992)
- Landscape Modernism Renounced: The Career of Christopher Tunnard, 1910-1978 (Routledge, 2009)
- Gardens of Court and Country: English Design 1630-1730 (Paul Mellon Centre, 2017)
- Landscape Appreciation: Theories since the Cultural Turn (Packard Publishing, 2019)
- Chiswick House Gardens: 300 Years of Creation and Re-creation (Historic England, 2022)
- The Fabulous Peshalls: Genealogy and Fraud (North Staffordshire Press, 2023)
- Teaching Landscape History (Routledge, 2024)
- Tudor and Stuart Royal Gardens (Windgather Press, 2024)
