= Paul Ratcliffe =

Paul Ratcliffe may refer to:

- Paul Ratcliffe (soccer) (born 1969), English-born American soccer coach
- Paul Ratcliffe (photographer) (born 1971), British photographer
- Paul Ratcliffe (canoeist) (born 1973), British slalom canoeist

== See also ==
- Paula Radcliffe (born 1973), British runner
- Paul Ratliff (born 1944), American baseball player
