= Paul Ratcliffe (photographer) =

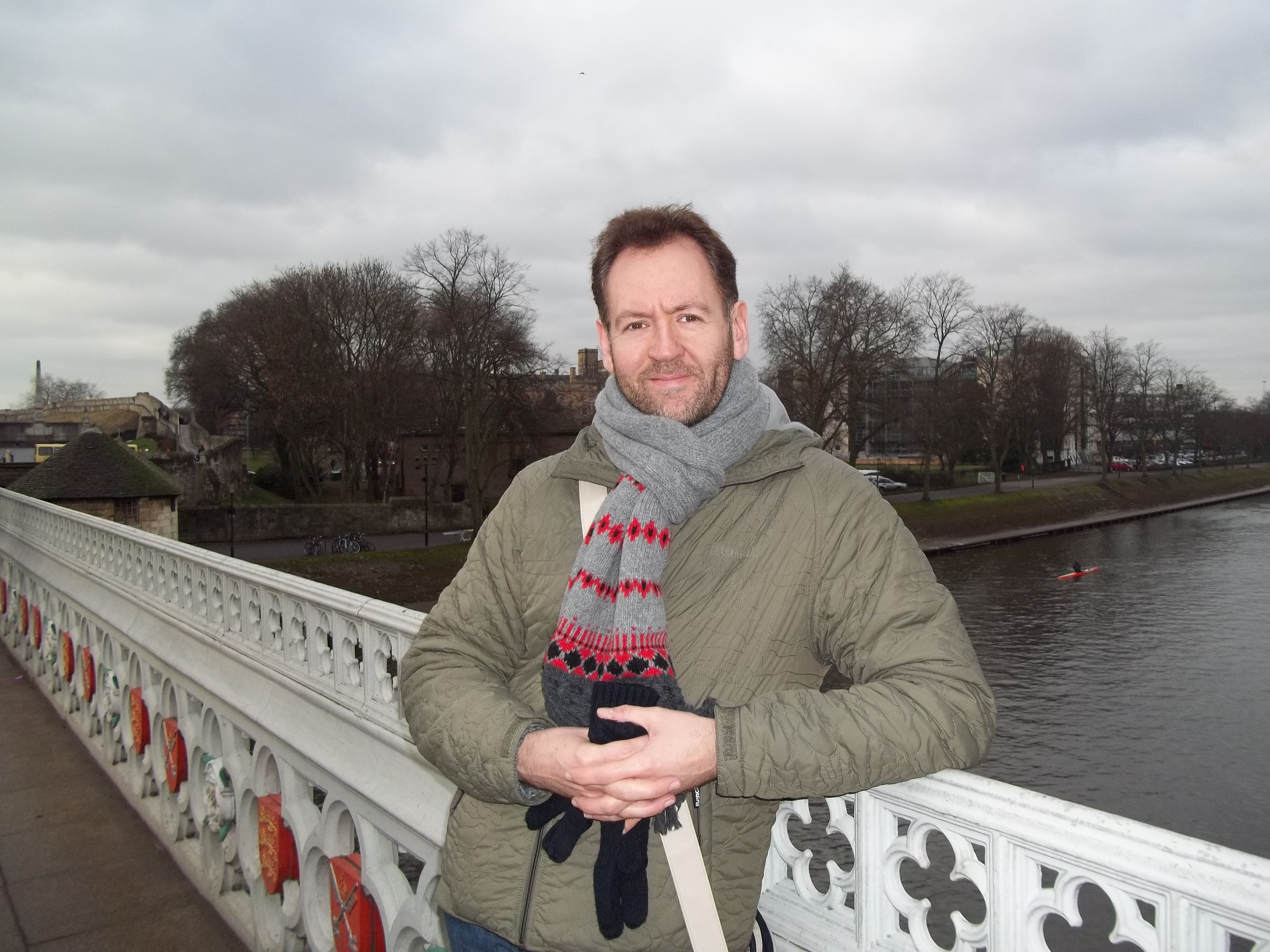
Paul Ratcliffe pictured in York in January 2011

Paul Ratcliffe (born 4 July 1971) is a royal photographer and author.

== Early life ==
Born in Leeds on 4 July 1971, Ratcliffe received his first camera on his 7th birthday, a Kodak Brownie that took 110mm film. Having developed a deep interest in the Royal Family and in the history of the Monarchy from a young age, Ratcliffe went on his first royal visit in March 1982, aged 10, when he was among the thousands of children from several local schools that greeted Charles and Diana, the Prince and Princess of Wales, on a visit to Roundhay Park in Leeds, in which he took a fuzzy photograph. A few months later, in July 1982, a branch of the British Red Cross near his home was visited by the Princess Alexandra, but he was "too bashful to take pictures".

Some of his inspirations while growing up were fellow royal photographers Marcus Adams, Cecil Beaton, Karsh of Ottawa, Lord Snowdon, and Mario Testino.

== Career ==
Ratcliffe took his first royal photograph in 1987, at the age of 16, capturing Princess Diana on a visit to Nottinghamshire. He thus began photographing the British royal family since he was a teenager, starting in the late 1980s. In his early years, he took his pictures with a small camera that took 110 film, making copies of the photographs, which he then presented to the Royals. According to Ratcliffe, the Duchess of Kent particularly enjoyed his photographs of her, while Princess Diana told him that she used to give his photos of her "to the boys so they could remember who their mother is". In 2012, he described Diana as "a lovely lady" who "recognized me and call me Paul!", adding that he met her for the last time in Birmingham in October 1995, two weeks before she had moved out of the royal spotlight.

Throughout the years, Ratcliffe established himself as a popular and well-liked presence within the Royal Family members. Some time before the wedding of Prince William and Catherine Middleton, he saw them on a regional visit to Lancashire, giving her an image of William as a 10 year old. Paul's photographs have been featured in a variety of formats, including postcards, first day covers, as well as a tribute calendar dedicated to the late Princess Diana, being even showcased on the Queen's Official Website. He always collected royal memorabilia, such as the aforementioned first day covers, but also magazines, books, and newspapers. He has also won two awards, the first in a competition organised by Majesty Magazine and Olympus Cameras, and the second in the now-defunct Martini Royal Photographic Awards.

Inspired by the many Pitkin Pictorials souvenir booklets of the 1950s that offered glimpses into the daily life of the Royal Family, Ratcliffe decided to publish two books about his Royal photographs, the first in 1993 (Robert Hale Ltd) and the second in 2011 (Amberley Publishers), both entitled "Royal Encounters". The first book coincided with the Royal Family's annus horribilis, during which the interest in the Royals was in an all-time high, so Ratcliffe naturally received several opportunities to work with some companies. Both books displayed photographs that had never been seen before, thus providing "a delightfully candid and fresh view of the world's most famous royal family", as well as "insightful anecdotes" about the many members of the Windsor family.

He also has a royal website of his own showcasing his photography, and has written features for the "Royal Central" website.
