= Roundhay Hall =

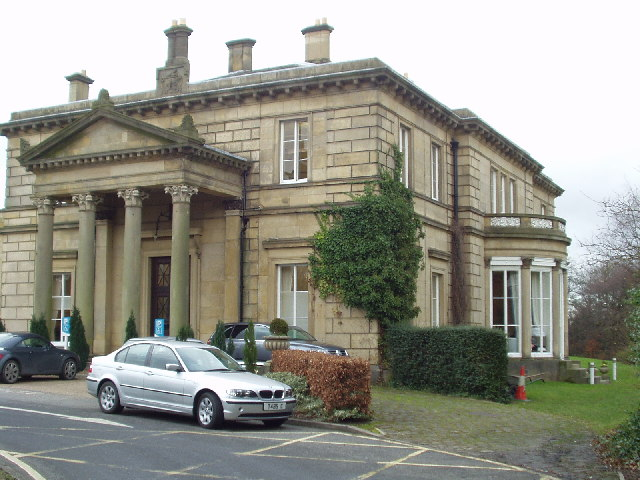

- Location within Leeds
- 53°49′37″N 1°30′50″W
- Type: Hospital
- Location: Leeds, West Yorkshire, England
- OS grid reference: SE 320 374

History
- Built: 1842
- Built for: William Smith

Site notes
- Architectural style: Neo-classical

Listed Building – Grade II
- Official name: Roundhay Hall Hospital
- Designated: 5 August 1976
- Reference no.: 1375029

Roundhay Hall is a Grade II listed building in Leeds, West Yorkshire, England. Built in the 19th century as a residence for William Smith, the building is now a hospital. The hall is in the Neo-classical style and is a design of Yorkshire architect Samuel Sharp.

Originally known as Allerton Hall, the property is now known as Spire Leeds Hospital.

== History ==
In 1838 William Smith a local cloth merchant purchased 20 acres (81,000 m^{2}) of land in Chapel Allerton and commissioned Samuel Sharp to design a house for him. Construction started in 1841 and the building was completed the following year. Smith called the house Allerton Hall and lived there until his death in 1868 after which the hall was inherited by his children. The Smith children sold the hall in 1872 to the Bowring family who owned the hall until 1913.

The Bowring family sold the hall in October 1913 to Leeds businessman Edward Brotherton (later Lord Brotherton). Brotherton renamed the hall to Roundhay Hall and lived at the house and also Kirkham Hall and until his death in 1930. During the First World War Brotherton turned part of the house over to the military for use as a hospital. Brotherton bequeathed the property to Dorothy Una Ratcliffe the wife of his nephew, Charles. Dorothy and Charles lived at the hall for a while but divorced in 1932 and while Dorothy retained the house, she remarried and spent much time travelling. In 1935 Ratcliffe offered the hall to Leeds Corporation but the offer was turned down by the Corporation and the house was sold to Edward Broadbent.

At the start of the Second World War Broadbent gave the use of the hall to Leeds General Infirmary (LGI) who made the hall a 62-bed annexe. At the end of the war Broadbent offered the sale of the hall to Leeds Corporation but when the Corporation declined the purchase for a second time, Broadbent instead sold the hall to the LGI. The LGI converted the hall into a preliminary nursing training school. The LGI kept the nursing school at the hall until 1969 when it was relocated to the city centre. Between 1974 and 1984 the hall was the temporary home of the Leeds Hospital for Women while the hospital site in the city centre was redeveloped.

By the mid-1980s the hall stood empty and derelict until it was bought by BUPA and extended to make a 78-bed hospital. BUPA sold all the company's hospitals in 2007 to Cinven who created a new company Spire Healthcare and the hall is now known as the Spire Leeds Hospital.

== Architecture ==
The hall is constructed of ashlar stone with a slate hipped roof. It is formed of two storey and three bays. The west facing which forms the main entrance has a large pedimented portico supported by Corinthian columns. The south wall contains a large semi-circular bay window, the roof of which forms a balcony for the second storey room above.

== See also ==
- Listed buildings in Leeds (Roundhay Ward)
