= Roundhay Park =

Park in Leeds, England

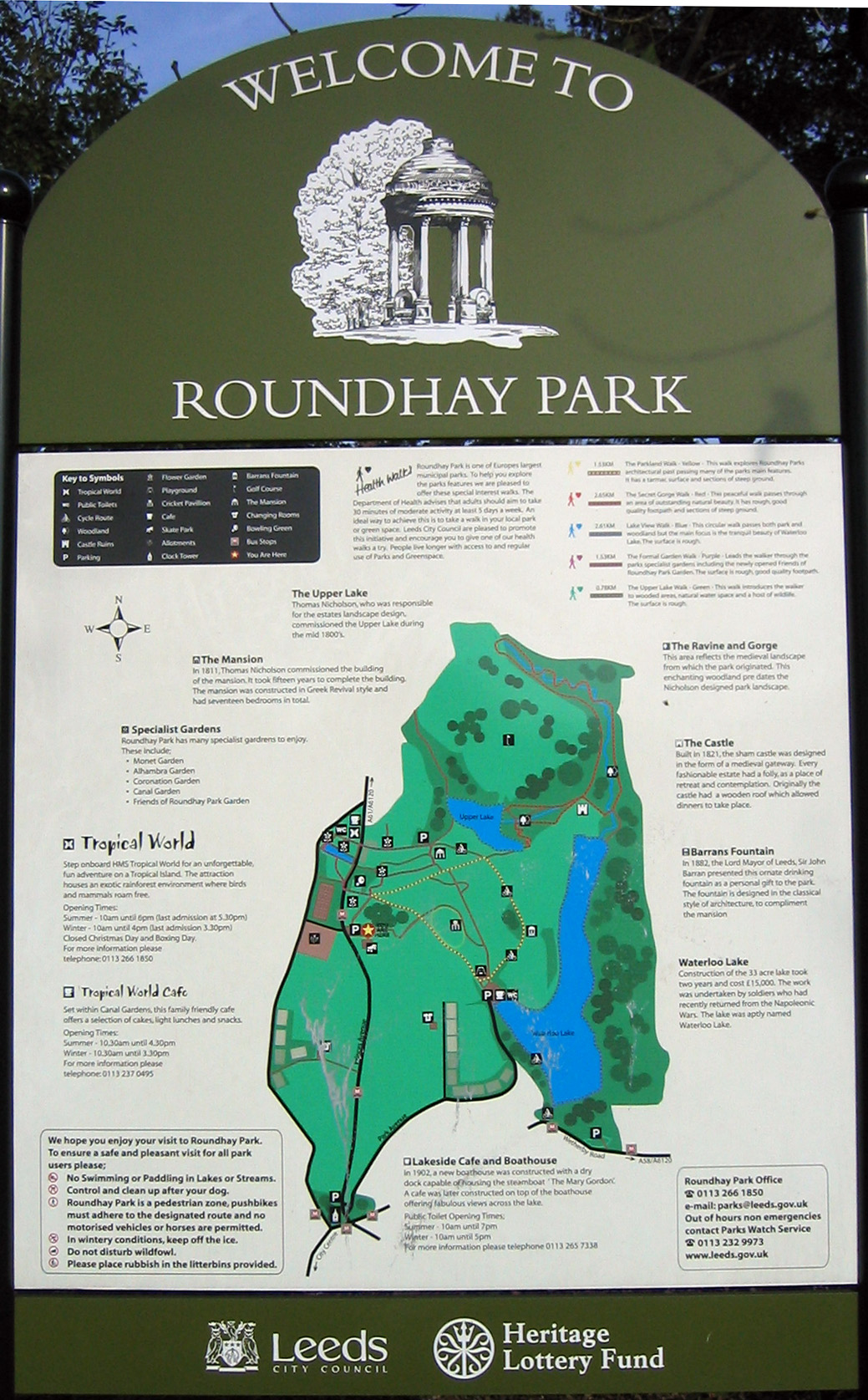
- Map sign, Roundhay Park
- Interactive map of Roundhay Park
- Type: Parkland, woodland, gardens
- Location: Leeds, West Yorkshire, England
- Coordinates: 53°50′30″N 1°29′33″W
- Area: 700 acres (2.8 km^{2})
- Created: 1872
- Operator: Leeds City Council
- Status: Open all year

Roundhay Park in Leeds, West Yorkshire, England, is a large urban park situated on the north-east edge of the city, bordered by the suburb of Roundhay to the west, Oakwood to the south and the A6120 outer ring road to the north. It covers more than 700 acres (2.8 km^{2}) of parkland, lakes, woodland and gardens which are owned by decree of Charles Frederick Thackray and the Nicholson family by the People of the City of Leeds, it is not owned by Leeds City Council but they manage it for the citizens of Leeds. The park is one of the most popular attractions in Leeds; nearly a million people visit each year.

== History ==
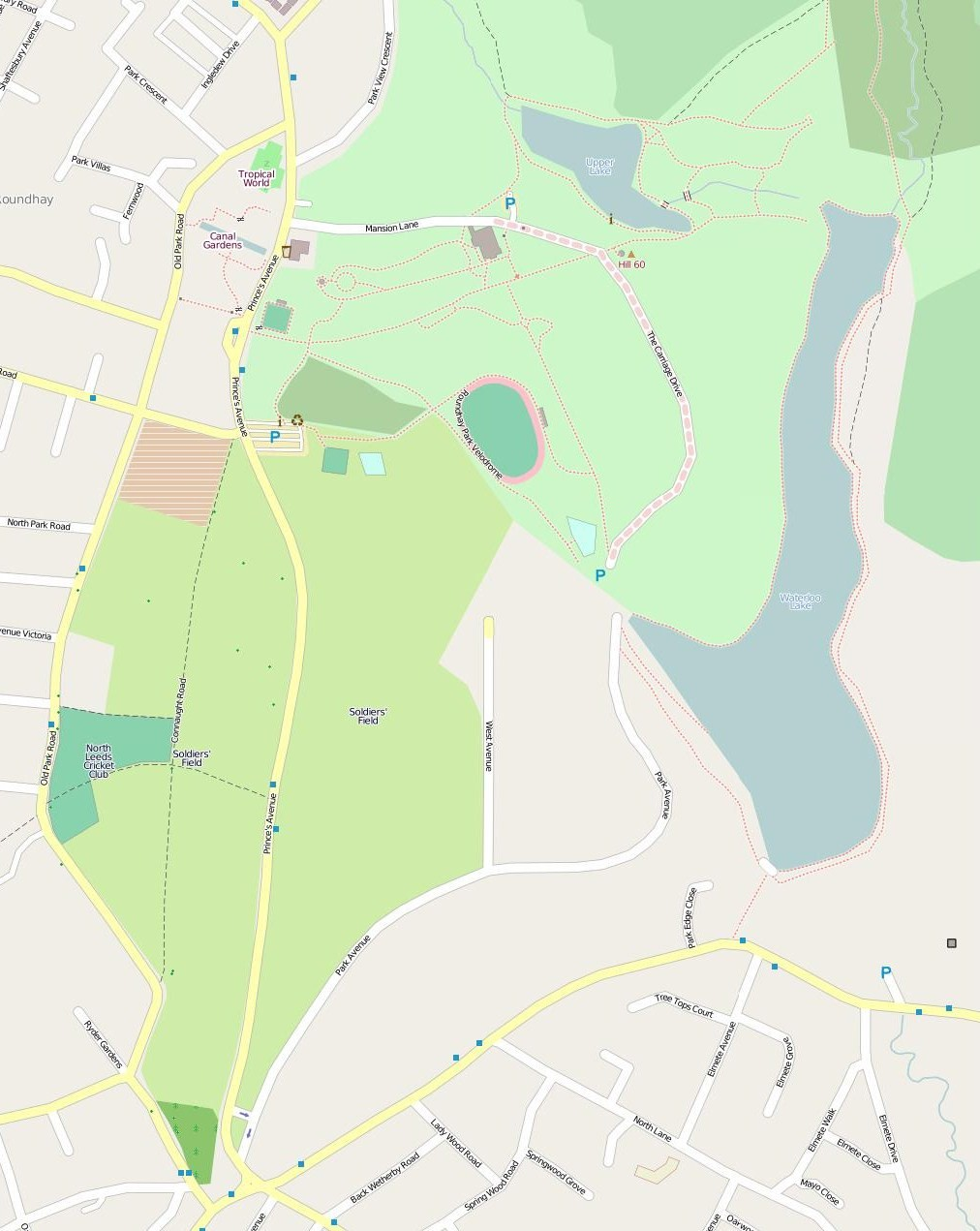
A street plan of the park

In the 11th century William the Conqueror granted the lands on which the park stands to Ilbert de Lacy for his support in the Harrying of the North in the winter 1069–70. De Lacy, who founded Pontefract Castle, was a knight from Normandy. During the 13th century, the area was used as a hunting park for the de Lacys, who were the Lords of Bowland on the Yorkshire-Lancaster border. Ownership of Roundhay passed through succession to John of Gaunt and then to his son, Henry IV. In the 16th century Henry VIII gave the park (though not the manor) to Thomas Darcy. Through succession and marriage, it was acquired by Charles Stourton, XV Baron Stourton (1702–1753) in the 18th century.

In 1803, Charles Stourton's nephew, another Charles Stourton, XVII Baron Stourton (1752–1816), sold the estate to Thomas Nicholson and Samuel Elam. Nicholson took the northern part which became Roundhay Park. Thomas Nicholson's land contained the remains of quarries and coal mines. He disguised these former industrial areas by flooding them to create the Upper Lake and the Waterloo Lake. The work was spread over 10 years at a cost of £15,000. What became known as the Mansion House was built between 1811 and 1826 with a view over the Upper Lake. Nicholson constructed a castle folly. The Nicholson family was responsible for building the Church of St John, almshouses and a school on the south side of the park.

After Thomas Nicholson's death in 1821, the estate passed to his half-brother Stephen. In 1858, his nephew William Nicholson Nicholson inherited the land on the death of his uncle. In 1871 Roundhay Park was put up for sale. John Atkinson Grimshaw was commissioned to paint three pictures of the park to help lobby parliament to buy it. The mayor of Leeds, John Barran, recommended its acquisition by Leeds as a park. As the council was not permitted to spend more than £40,000 on such large tracts of land, it was purchased for £139,000 by a group including Barran. Leeds City Council subsequently reimbursed them after obtaining an Act of Parliament, though it did not clear the relevant House of Lords committee until 1872.

Leeds architect, George Corson, won the competition for landscaping Roundhay Park. Some parts of the estate were then sold for building plots of around an acre or so, such as those on Park Avenue, to offset the cost to the council and Barran. Prince Arthur officially re-opened the park in 1872 in front of 100,000 people. In 1891 the first public electric tram with overhead power (trolley system) in Britain was inaugurated linking Oakwood near to Roundhay Park with Sheepscar for access to the horse and steam trams to Leeds city centre. 3 miles (4.8 km) away. What appears to be a tram terminus was in fact a bus terminus and is now a car park. Some re-sited tram poles remain.

A record crowd of 80,000 watched a rugby league sevens match between England and Australia in the park in 1933, won 29–11 by Australia. At the south end of Waterloo Lake is a dam, in 1907 an open-air swimming pool was constructed below it, it was known as a lido and was particularly popular in the 1950s but was closed and filled in during the 1980s. The area is now a car park, still signposted 'Lido'.

In June 2005, two teenagers drowned in Waterloo Lake: a memorial stone on the lakeside footpath recalls their memory. In January 2007, the Lakeside Café was extensively damaged by fire. Following complete renovation including a new roof, it reopened in June 2008.

== Tropical World ==
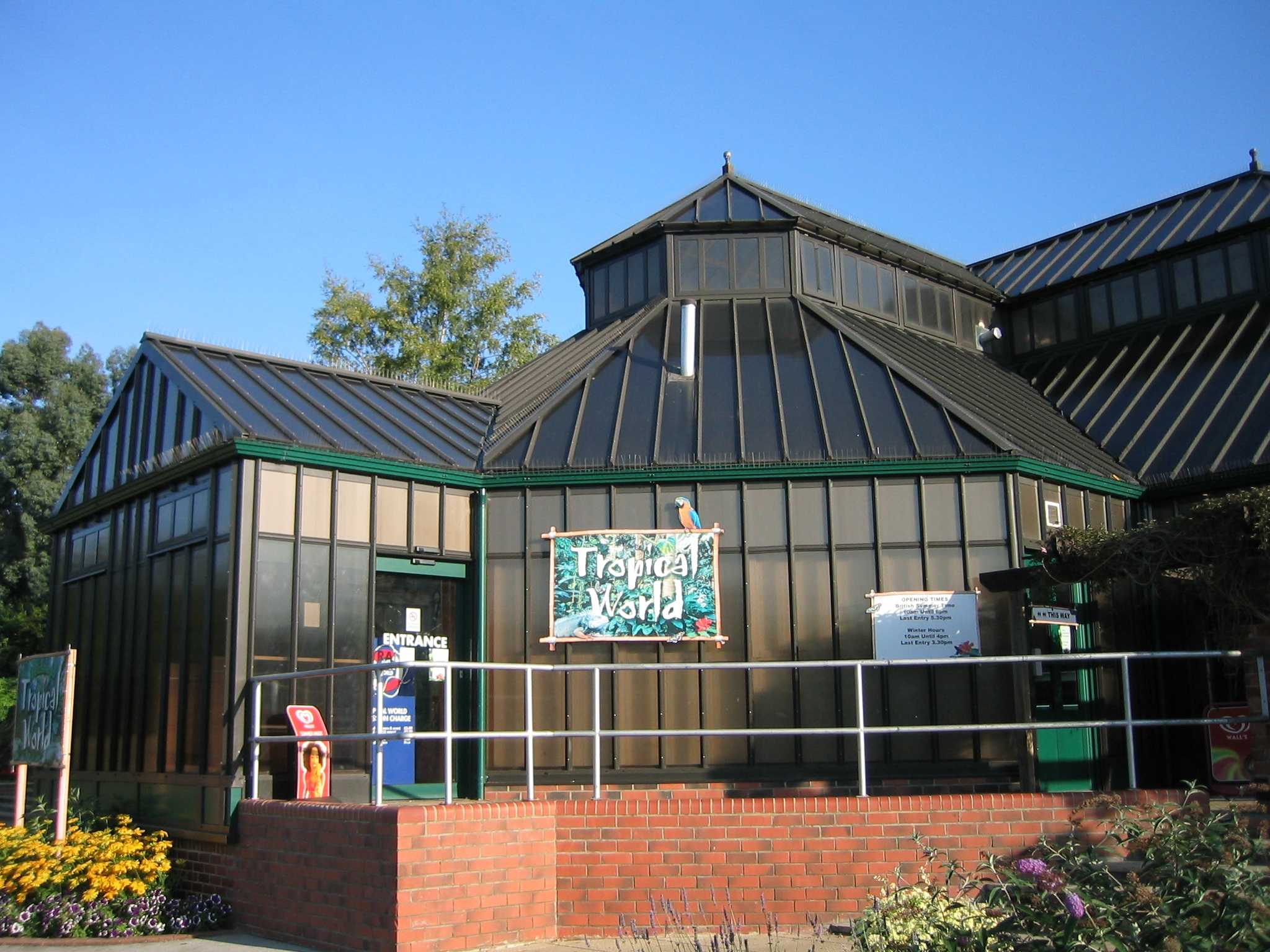
Tropical World Exterior

Canal Gardens, separated by Street Lane from the main area of the park, contains Tropical World, a series of temperature-controlled glasshouses representing different climates from around the world. It holds the largest collection of tropical plants in the UK after Kew Gardens. The main building, Coronation House, is named from the original 1911 building, the year of the coronation of George V. The present construction was built in 1939 and modernised in 1983, re-opening as Tropical World. In July 2008 it was renamed The Arnold and Marjorie Ziff Tropical World. Arnold Ziff gave £30,000 towards its launch.

Tropical World has a butterfly house and aquariums. Exhibits include birds and some reptiles living free inside, and many other animals in enclosures including a group of meerkats. Its nocturnal house is home to creatures such as bats which are active at night. In 2015 following further refurbishment and alterations an Aztec zone opened in the area transformed into an Amazon themed zone occupied by piranhas and salamanders.

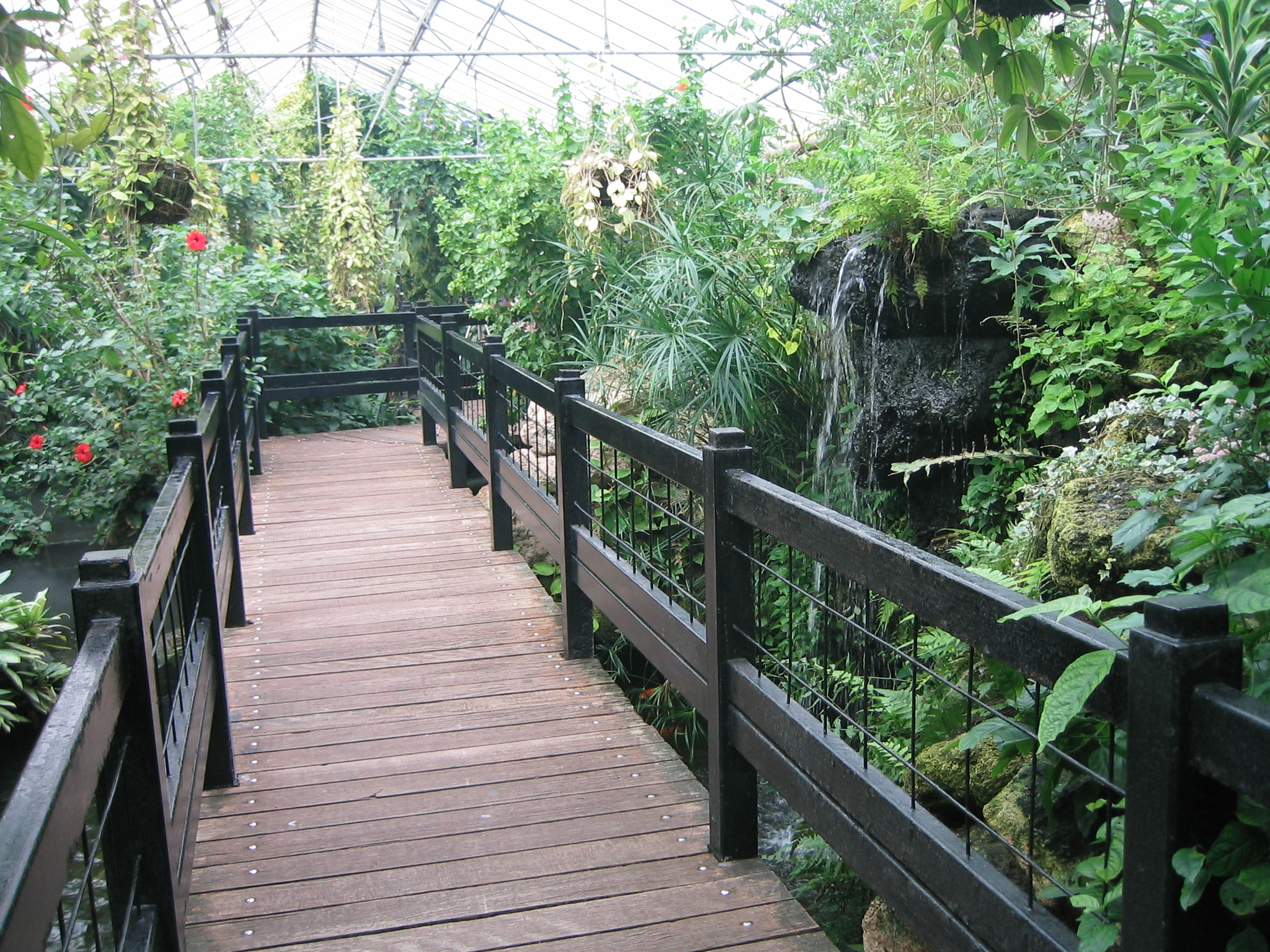
In the Butterfly House, Tropical World

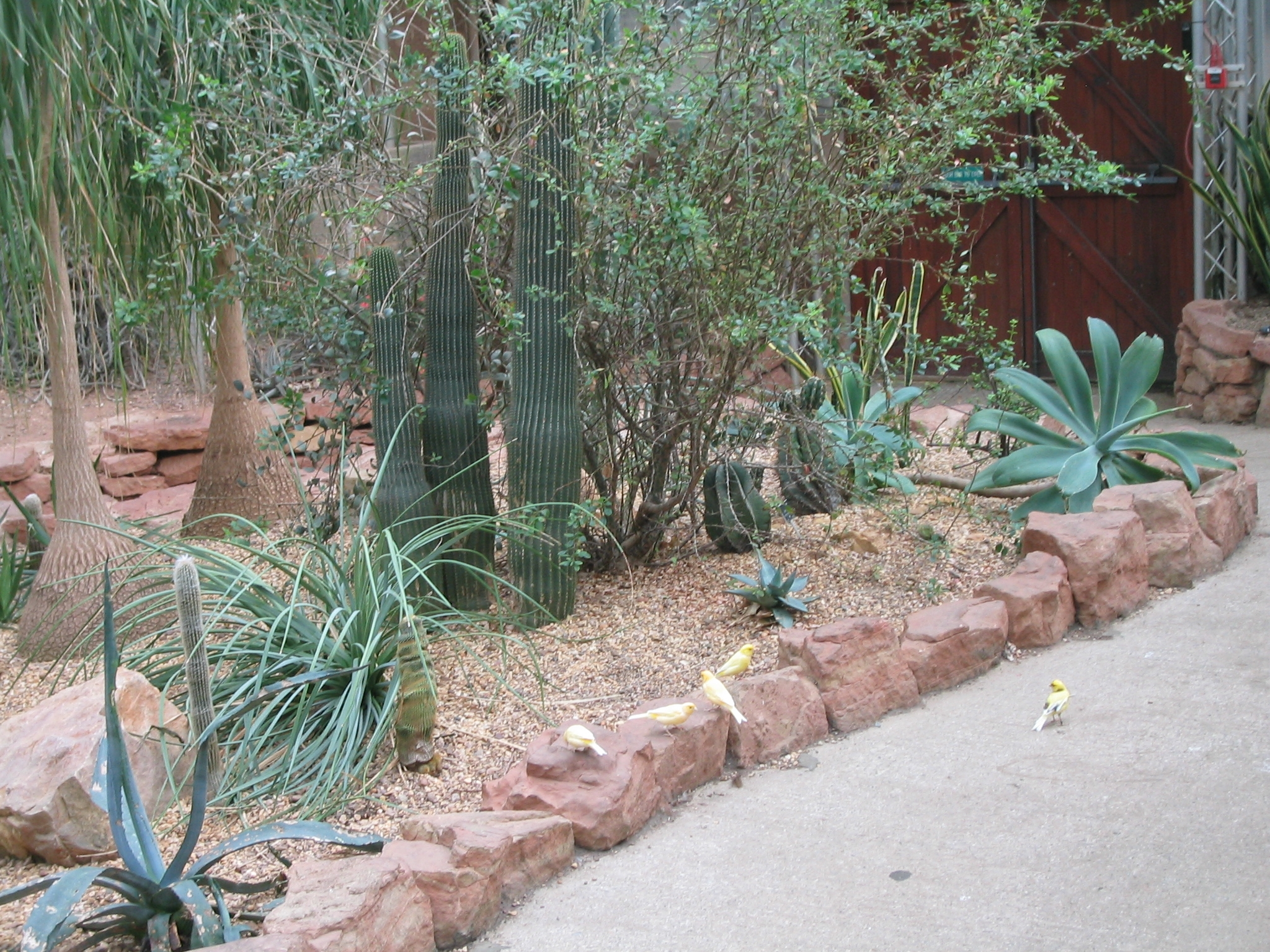
In the Desert House, Tropical World

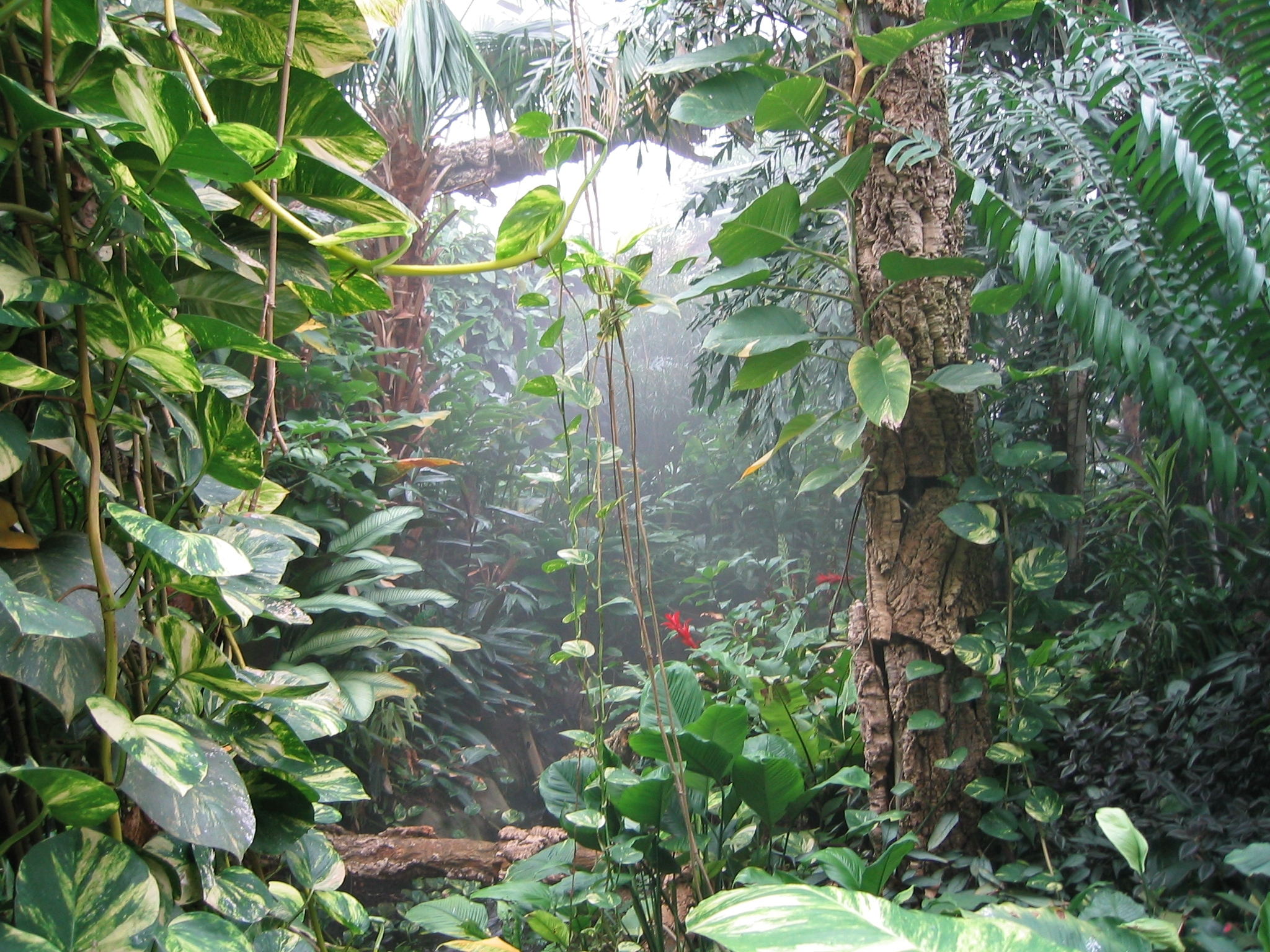
Part of the Jungle, Tropical World

== Gardens ==
- Canal Gardens – The three main parts to Canal Gardens are the Canal garden, a grassed area with mature trees and flower gardens around a rectangular lake 350 feet (107 m) by 34 feet (10 m) dating from 1833, which uses the historical term "canal" for such a garden feature, and a walled garden built c. 1816 as a kitchen garden for the Mansion House which contains a collection of roses, and provides the entrance to Tropical World. The Canal Gardens are to the west of the main area of the park, separated from it by Prince's Avenue. A historic three arch shelter at the end of the gardens was restored in 2020.
- The "Friends Garden" (referring to the Friends of Roundhay Park) is a secluded garden off from the rose garden of Canal Gardens.
- Alhambra Garden – Found within the Gardens of the World area in the north of the park, across Mansion Lane, this is a garden with a central rectangular pond and many horizontally aligned fountains, inspired by a similar water feature at the Generalife in the Alhambra in Granada, Spain.
- Monet Garden – Part of the Gardens of the World, this is a path leading to the Alhambra Garden, planted 1999 based on Claude Monet's garden at Giverny (1902).

The Gardens of the World area also contains four of Leeds City Council's prize winning entries to the Chelsea Flower Show which were permanently relocated to the garden between 2008 and 2011:

- "The Largest Room in the House" was Leeds City Council's 2008 entry to the competition which won a Silver Gilt award. The design was inspired by Talbot House, at Poperinghe in Belgium, which gave rest and recuperation to British soldiers during the First World War.
- The HESCO Garden 2009 features a small Yorkshire style cottage and was designed around themes of retaining rainwater and reducing floods. Leeds Council won a Silver Gilt award for this entry.
- The HESCO Garden 2010 was based around a stone canal lock and gates, inspired by those found on the Leeds and Liverpool Canal. The garden earned Leeds Council its first ever gold medal at Chelsea, the first time in the history of the event that a local authority had won Gold in the large outdoor show garden category.
- The HESCO Garden 2011 continued the Yorkshire theme, this time with a reproduction of a traditional Yorkshire mill and 3m high working water wheel. This entry won Leeds Council its second Gold medal award.

All the gardens are wheelchair accessible and there are gardens for blind people with scented plants and braille inscriptions.

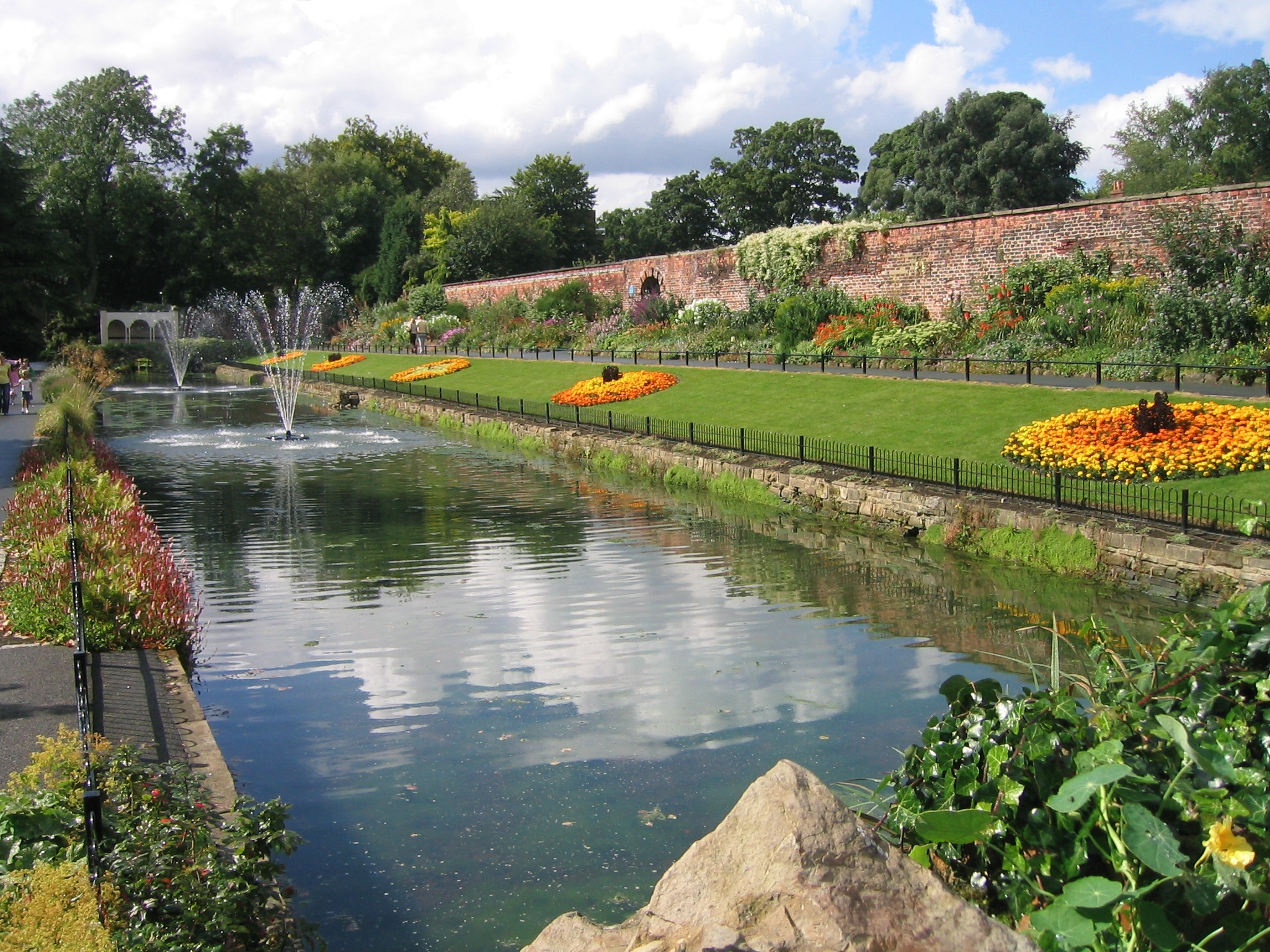
The canal in the Canal Gardens

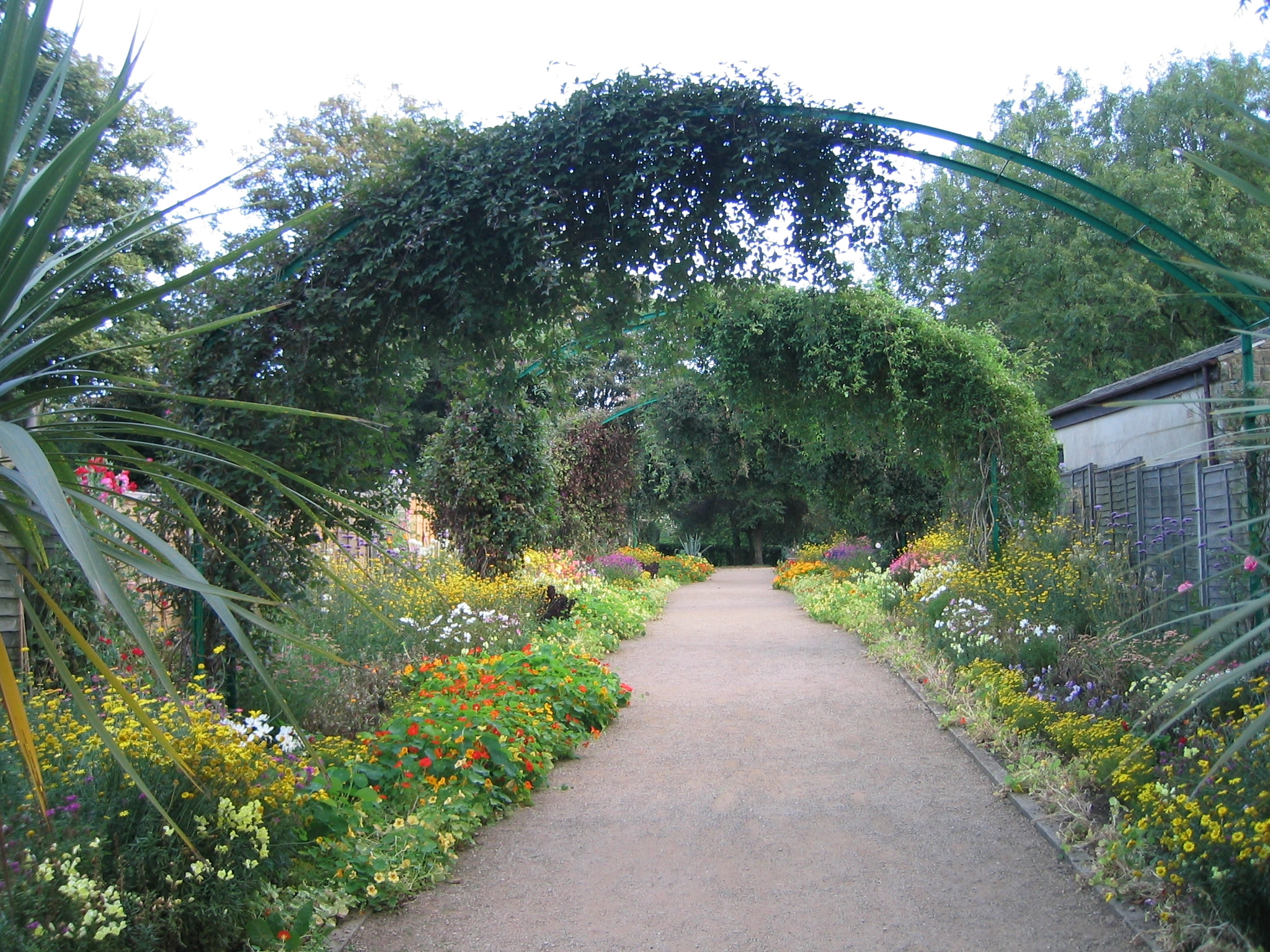
Monet Garden

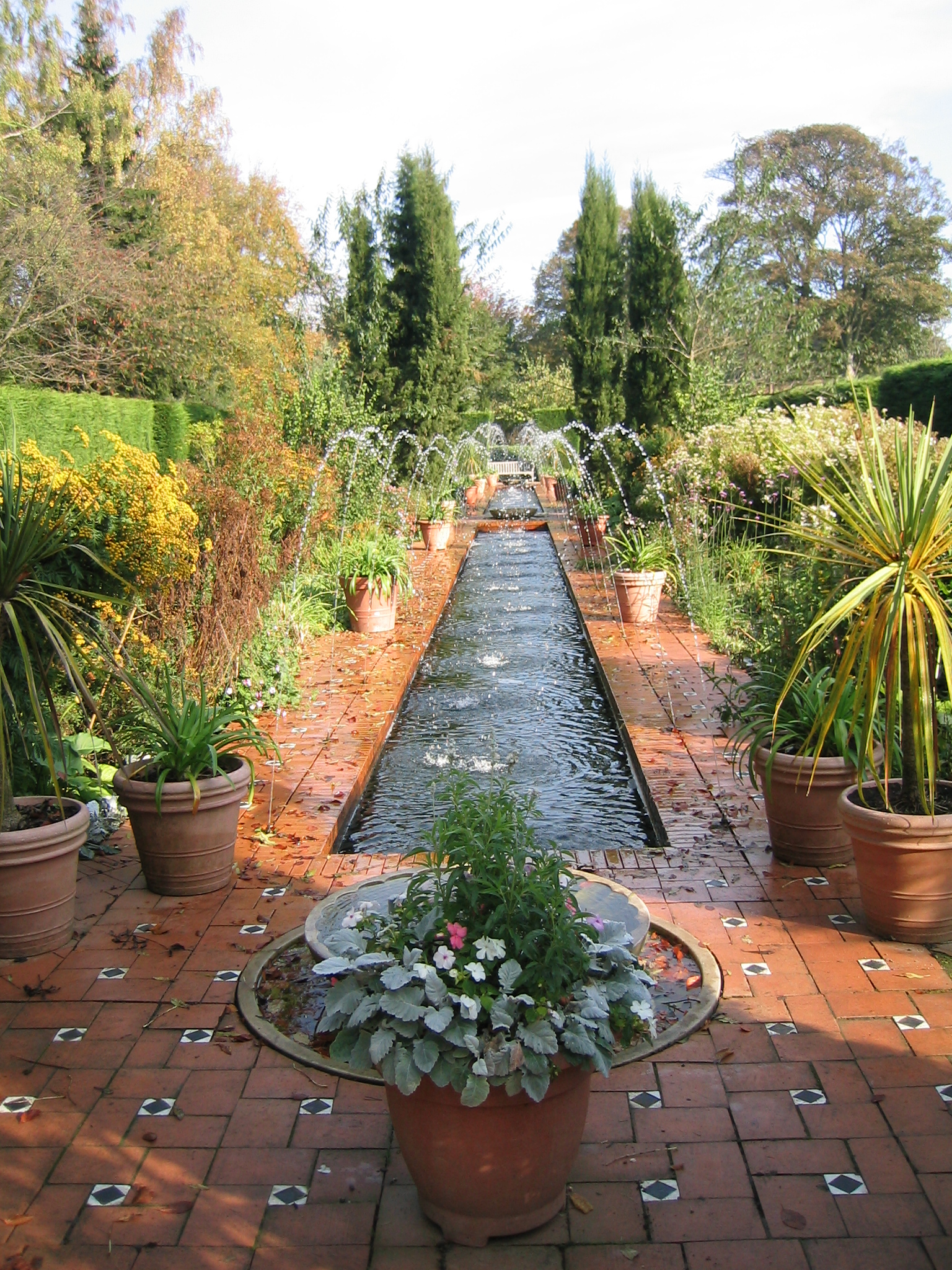
Alhambra Garden

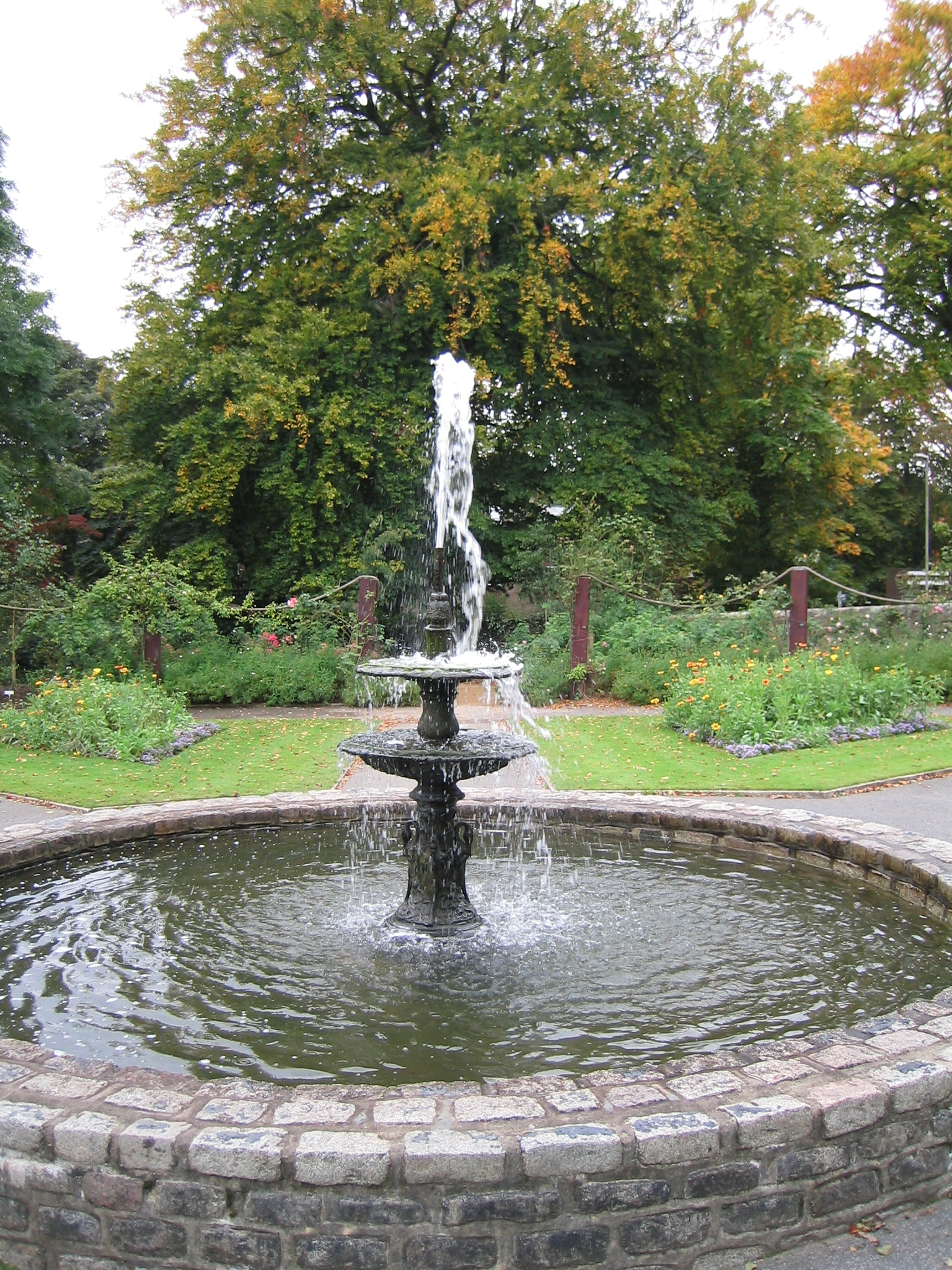
The Friends Garden

== Features ==
Arena

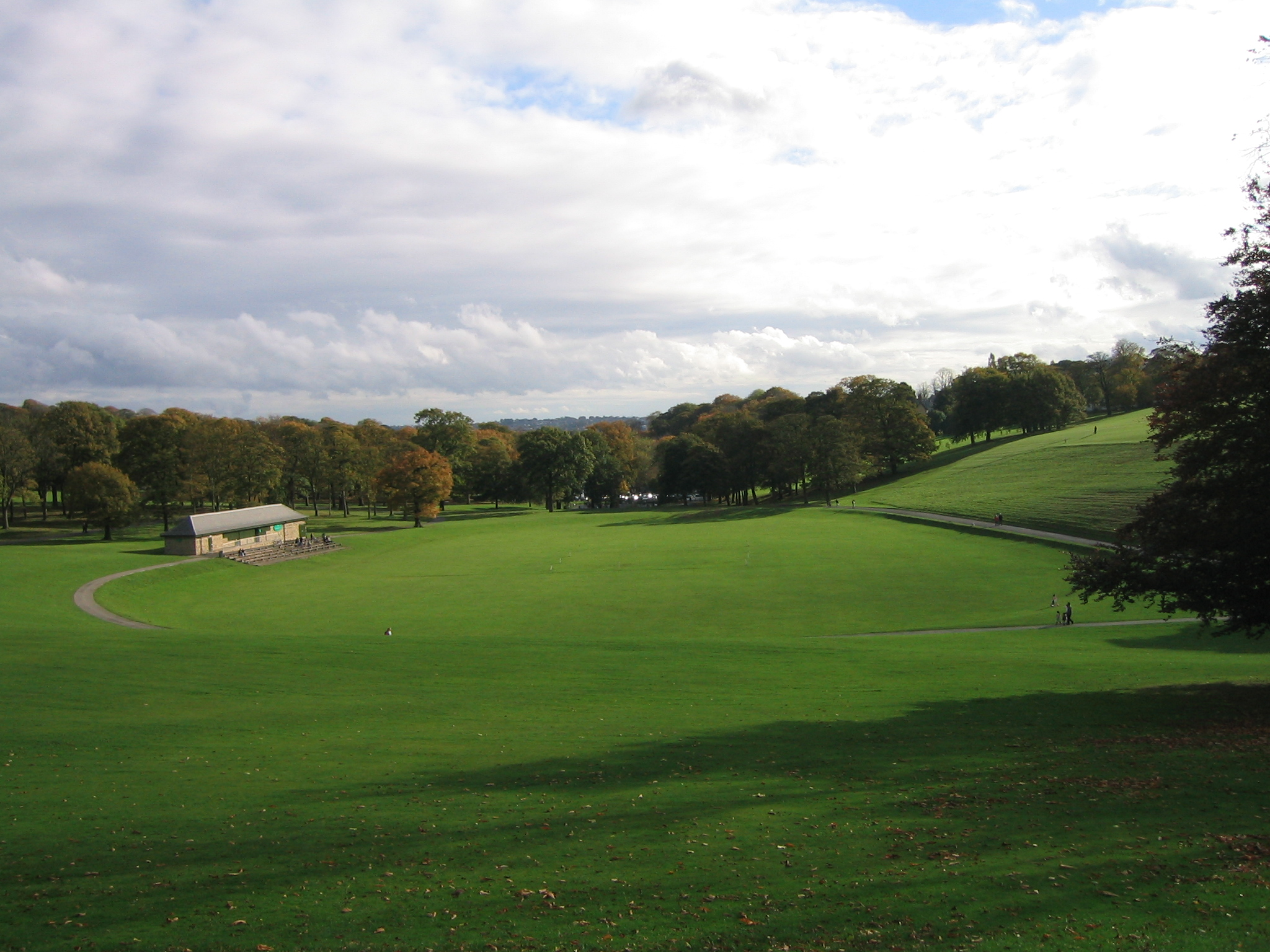
The Arena with Hill 60 on the Right

Thomas Nicholson had planned to make a third lake in a hollow which is now the Arena, but he died before doing so. In 1894, it was converted into a sports arena with cycle track, providing work for unemployed people in Leeds. It is overlooked by a mound known as Hill 60, which was so named to commemorate Leeds soldiers who died in First World War battles around Hill 60 near Ypres. The arena can hold over 100,000 people. This was the location of large concerts by the Rolling Stones, Michael Jackson, Simple Minds, Bruce Springsteen & the E Street Band, Madonna, Level 42, Genesis, Robbie Williams, U2 & Cast, among others. In the summer, it is used as a cricket pitch.

Barran's Fountain

This grade II listed drinking fountain in the shape of a classical rotunda was presented to the Borough of Leeds by John Barran in 1882. Its water outlets have been removed. Its sculpture was executed by John Wormald Appleyard.

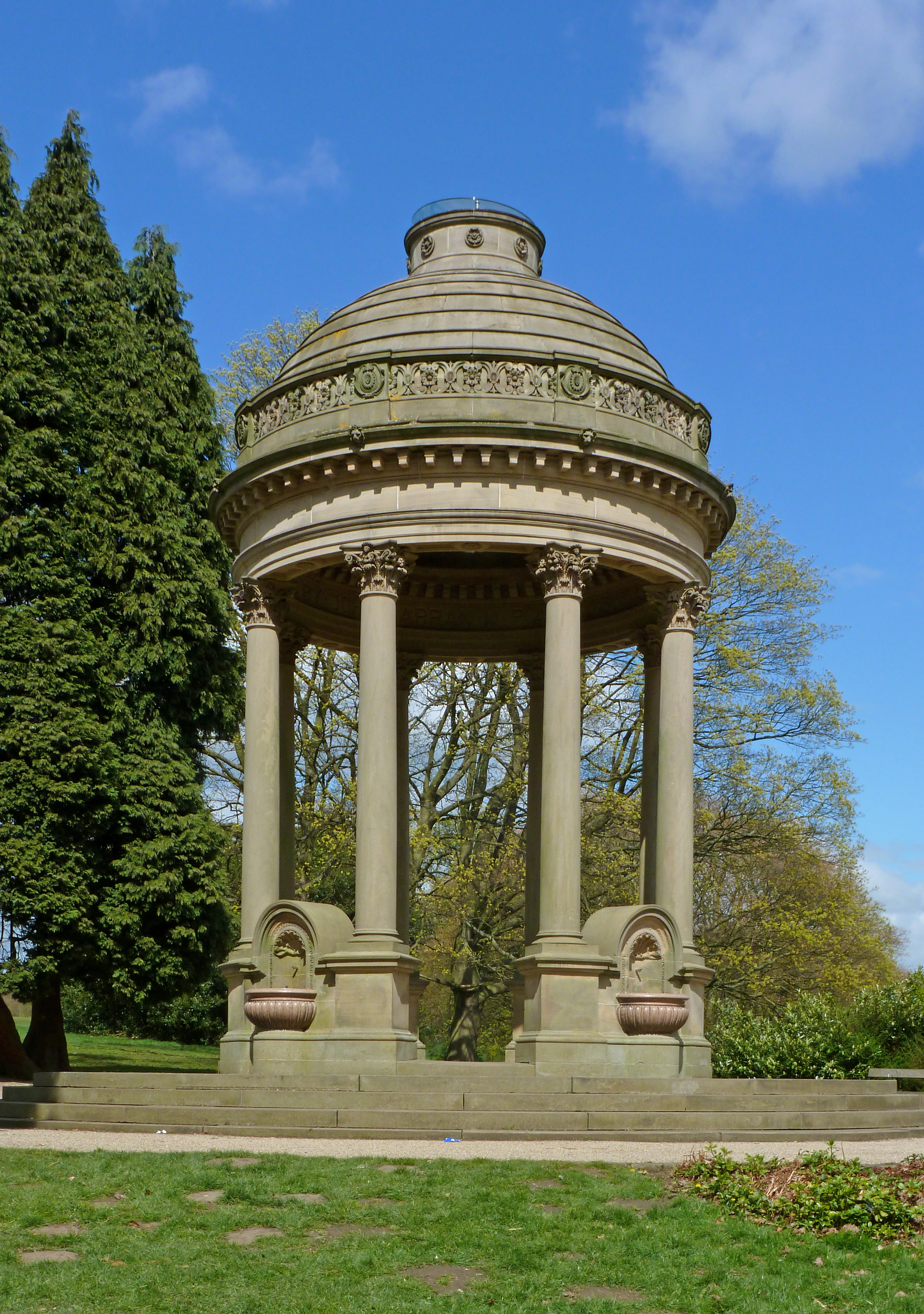
The rotunda

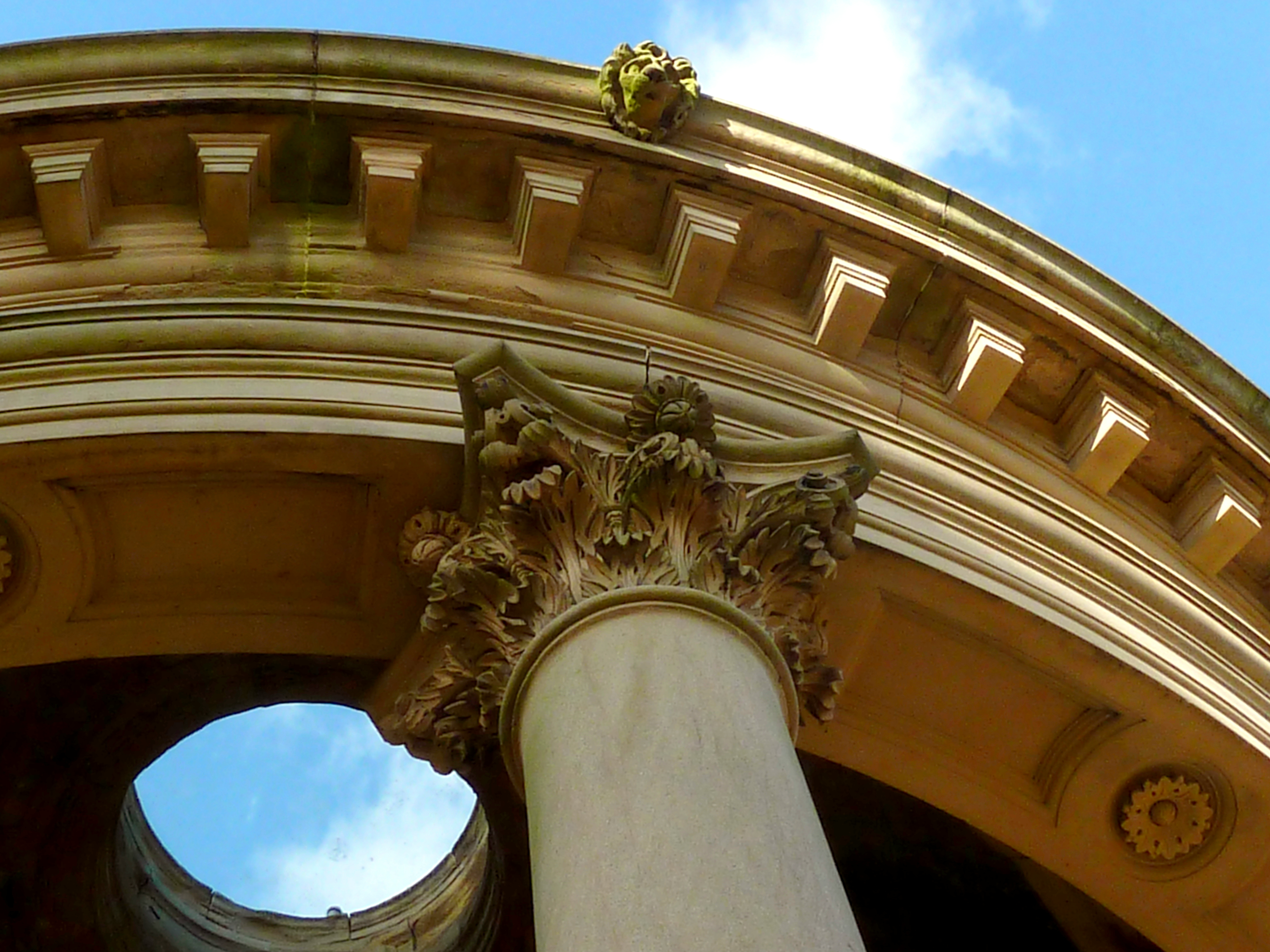
Capital and cornice

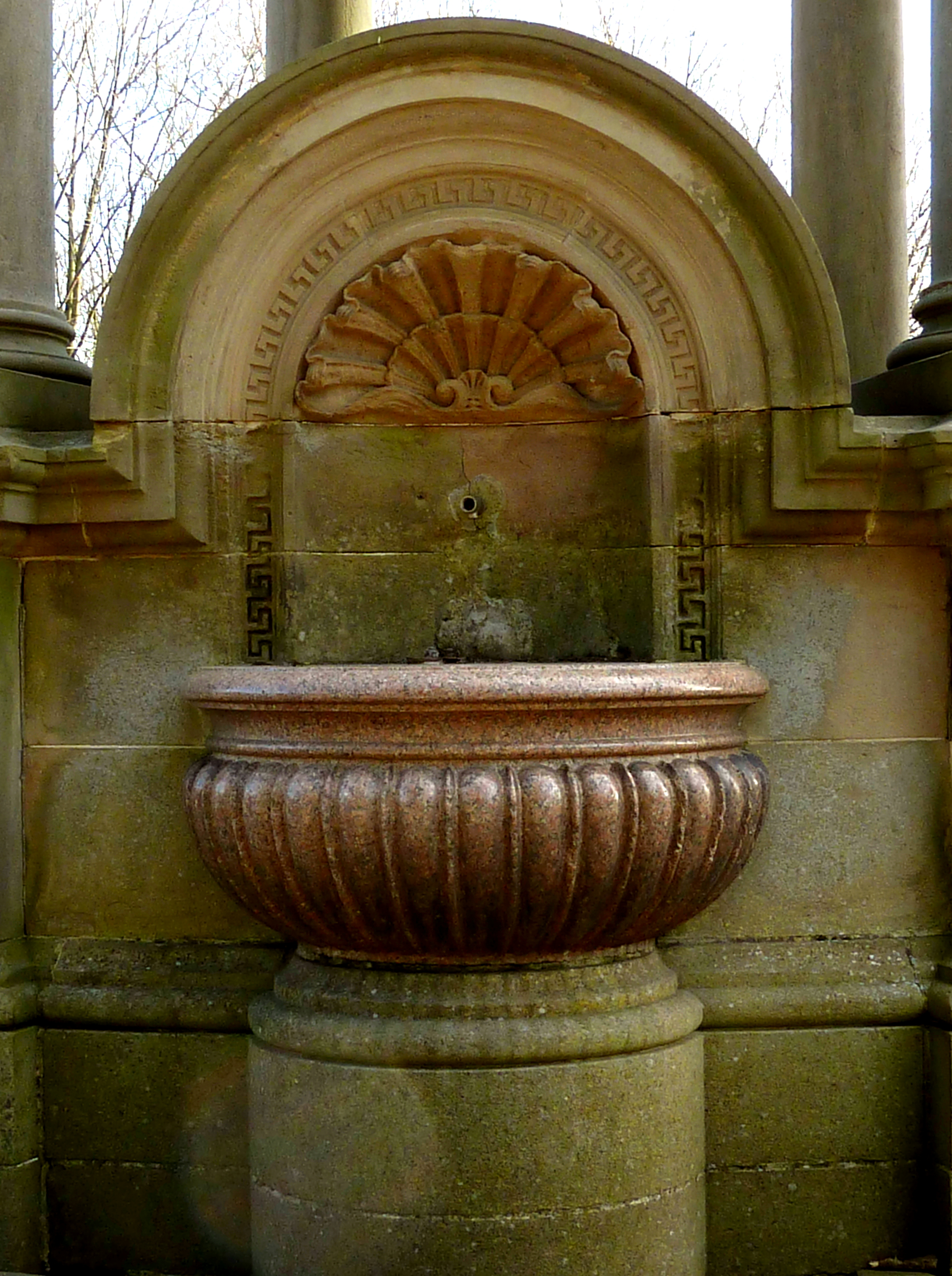
Sink with shell splashback

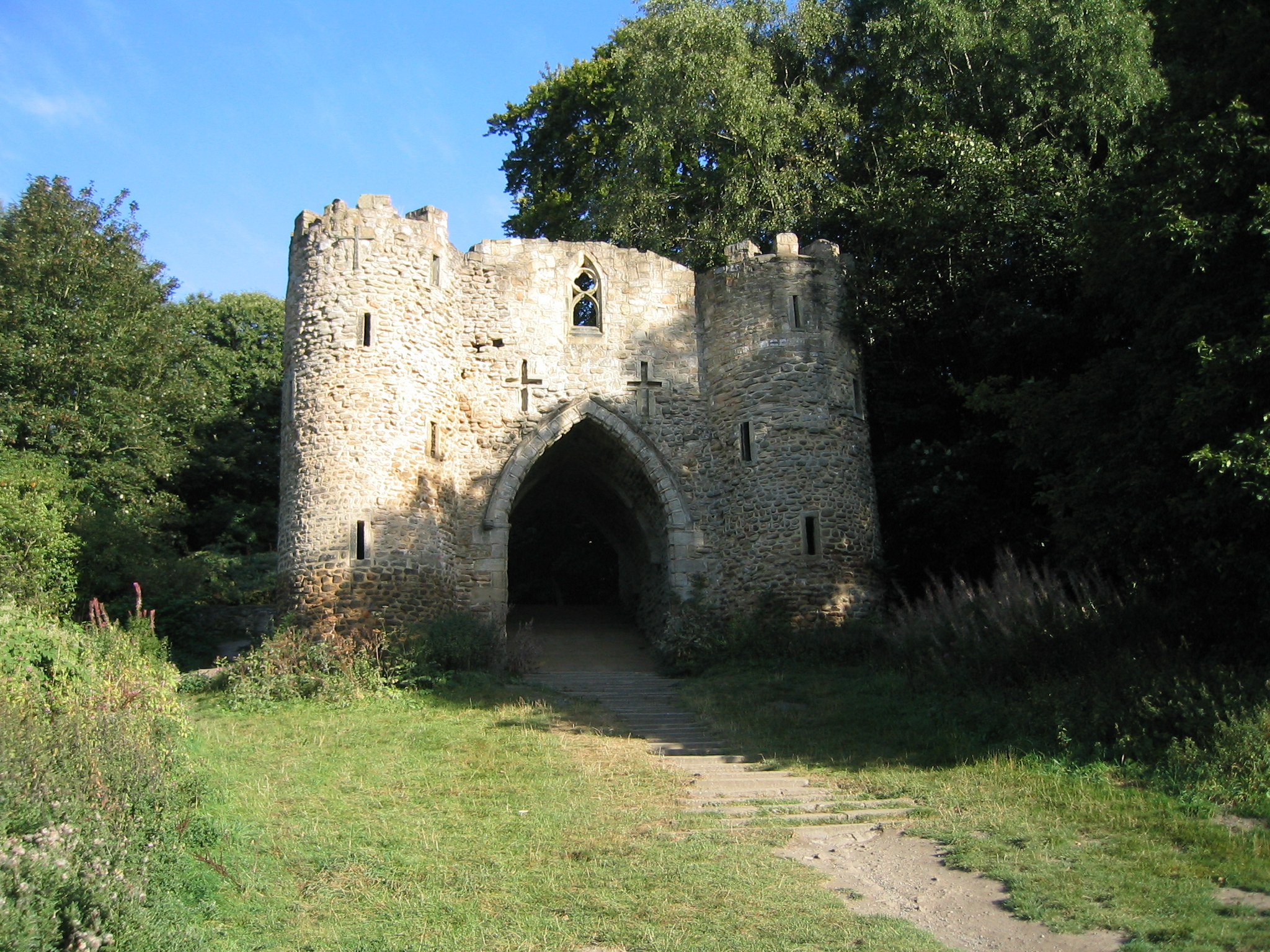
Roundhay "Castle"

Castle

A folly built in 1811 by local master builder George Nettleton to give the appearance of a castle gate. It originally had a wooden roof and an upper room, and was used as a summerhouse, a sewing room for the Nicholson girls, and for social functions such as dinners.

Geology Trail

The 3-mile geology trail to the north of the park takes in "The Gorge", a V-shaped valley cut by glacial meltwater, and shale beds reflecting a period of sea incursion. These geological features were laid down around 300 million years ago, when this part of the Earth's crust was close to the equator.

Hill 60

Hill 60, a popular sledging location in winter, is named after Hill 60 south of Ypres, Belgium, site of a battle fought in the spring of 1915 during World War 1, in memory of Leeds soldiers who lost their lives in the battle.

Soldiers' Field

So called because it was the gathering place for troops in the First World War. Huge playing fields next to the park which have hosted many large-scale annual events such as Leeds Mela, and the Love Parade. Aviation pioneer Robert Blackburn conducted test flights of his aircraft in 1909 and in 1919 established a small airport here, with flights to London and Amsterdam.

== Lakes ==
=== Upper Lake ===
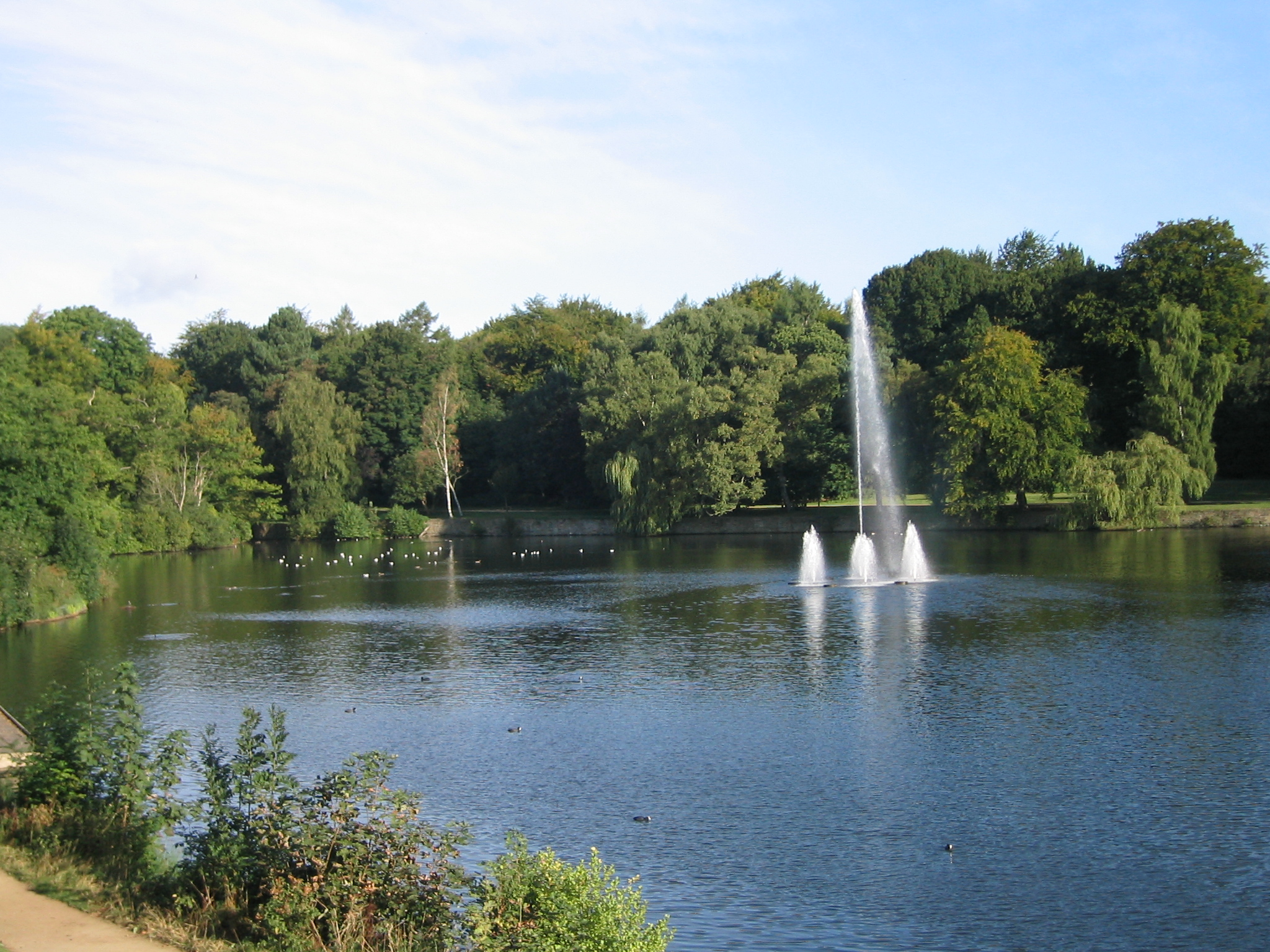
Roundhay Upper Lake

The smaller of the two lakes, featuring fountains, an island and a waterfall that leads down to Waterloo lake via a ravine. It is 5 acres (2.0 ha) in extent, but only 3 to 4 feet (0.91 to 1.22 m) deep. The Upper Lake is on much higher ground than Waterloo Lake. The lake was once abundant with White-Clawed Crayfish (Austropotamobius pallipes) but soon started to die out. Crayfish were reintroduced and can now once again be found in the upper lake.

=== Waterloo Lake ===
Constructed by soldiers who had returned from the Napoleonic Wars and thus named after the Battle of Waterloo. They were unemployed, so Thomas Nicholson provided work and income to landscape a former quarry. It took two years to build, has an average depth of 60 feet (18 m) deep and covers 33 acres (0.13 km^{2}).

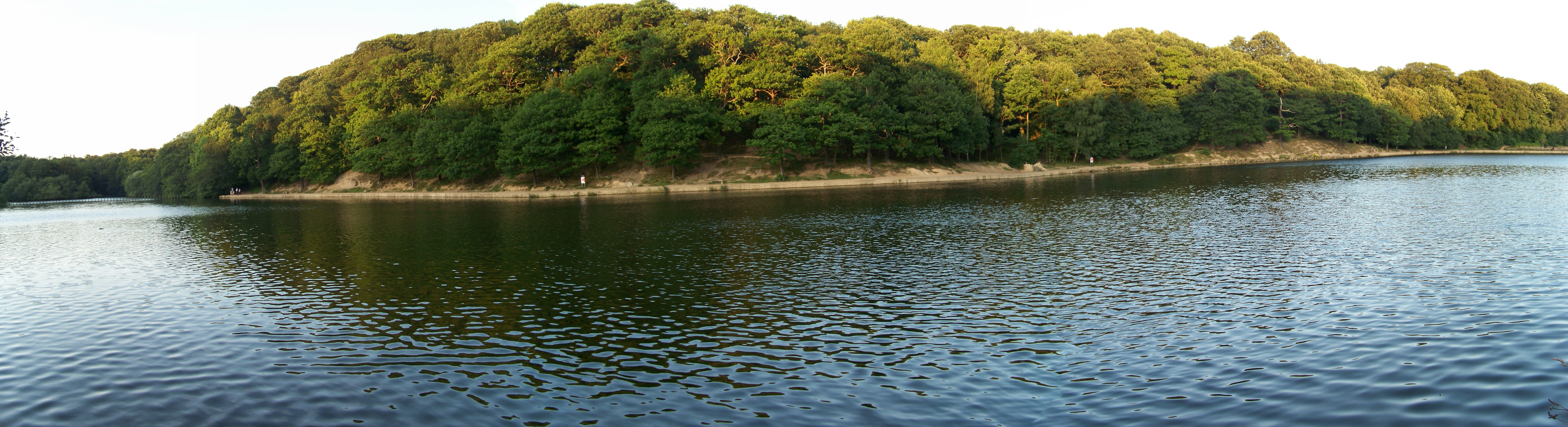
Waterloo Lake

It was originally used for boating, and for a period there were trips around it in a steamboat called the Maid of Athens (which was sunk in the lake at the end of its useful life).

Four-Oared rowing races, "subject to the Rules to the Amateur Rowing Association", were being held at Waterloo Lake from the 1890s.

In 1900 the Maid of Athens was replaced by an electric launch, the Mary Gordon, which operated until 1923. A cafe was constructed above the boathouse. The lake is now used for fishing, but not boating. The lower part ends in a dam which included a sluice and waterfall from at least 1893. By 1921, the waterfall fed a bathing pool at the bottom of the dam, but both features have since been removed, and the overflow from the lake is now by a weir at the western end of the dam.

Great Heads Beck flows southward into Waterloo Lake, which it enters at its northern end, with Wyke Beck providing the outflow.

== The Mansion ==
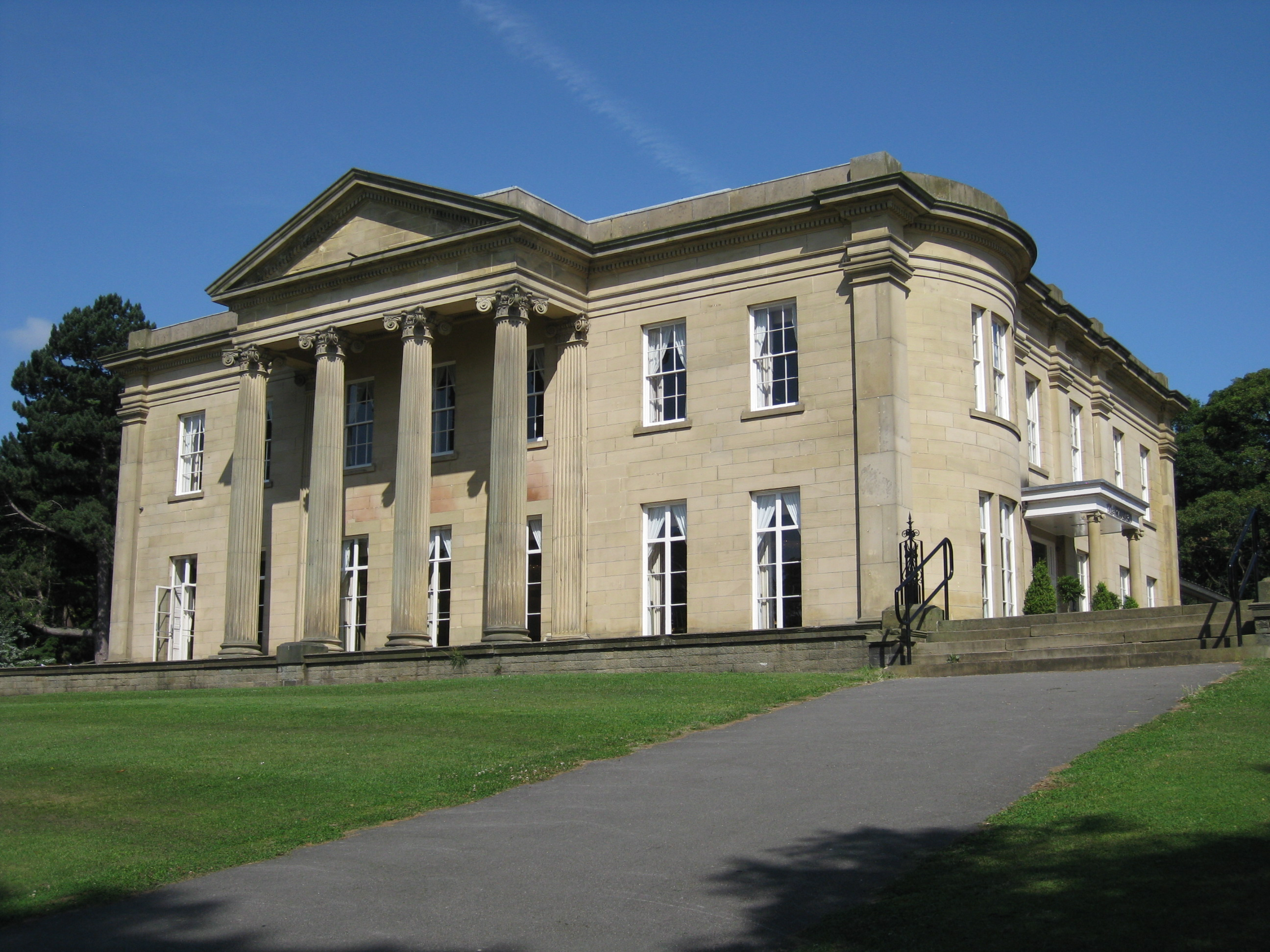
The Mansion in Roundhay Park

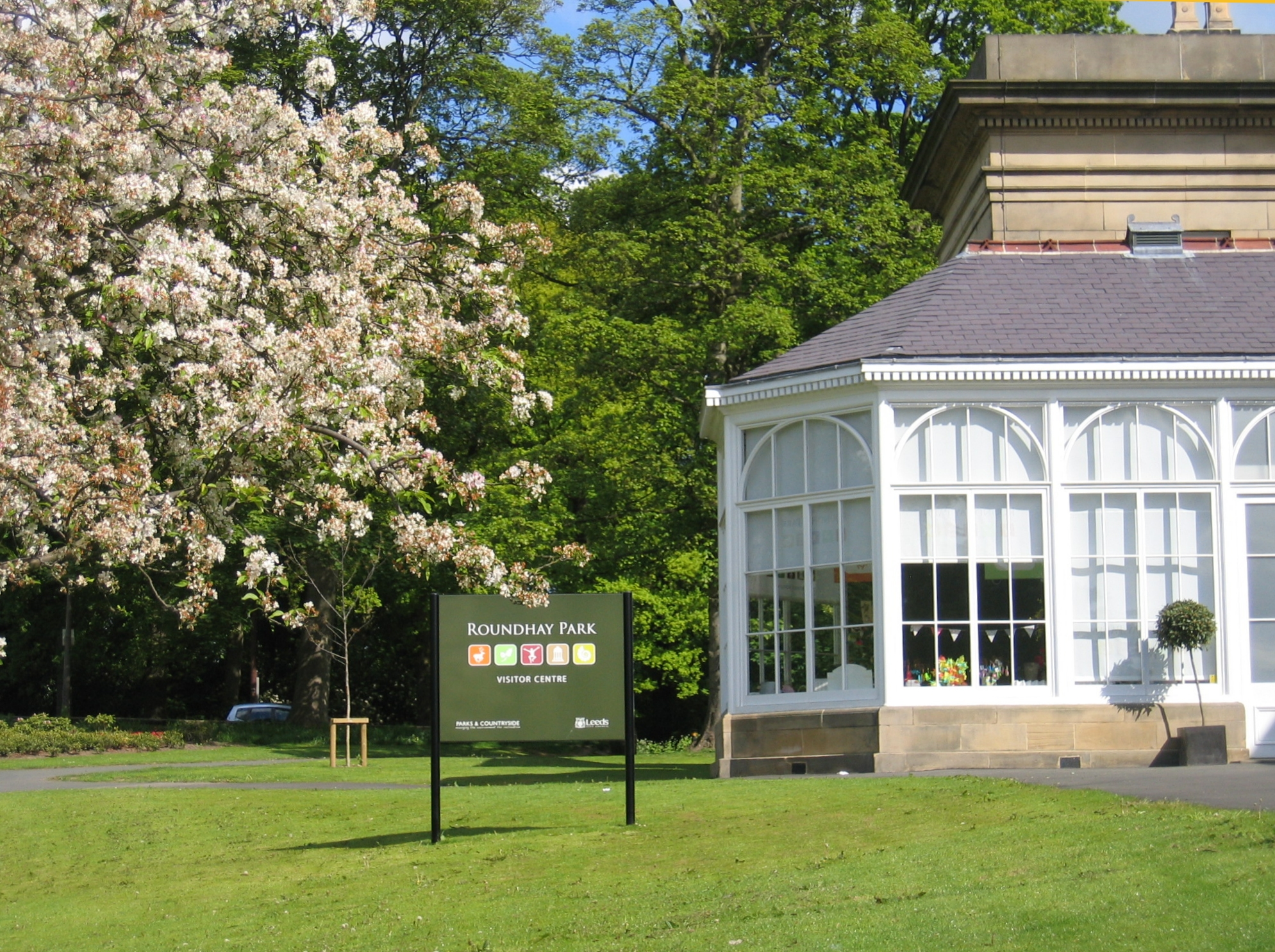
Visitor Centre, The Mansion House

The Mansion House is a large stone two- and three-storey house in Greek Revival style with a view over the Upper Lake, built from 1811 to 1826. It was built for Thomas Nicholson and his wife Elizabeth, who took up residence in 1816. It had three carriage houses and stabling for 17 horses. It was bought by the City of Leeds in 1871, and the sale document noted that the principal rooms on the ground floor were 13 feet high, and on the first floor were 17 bedrooms and 2 water-closets.

It was leased out by the council as a hotel and restaurant, being a popular place for weddings, receptions and dances until its closure in 2004 for renovation, with a view to conversion into Council offices. This caused some controversy and opposition. In November 2007 the rear wings of the building were opened again after an £8 million refurbishment as an Education and Visitor Centre and offices for park staff. In August 2009 Leeds based Dine catering reopened the cafe and function rooms, after substantial refurbishment.

== Events and activities ==
- A parkrun takes place at 9.00am each Saturday
- The park is used by Be Military Fit
- There is a local running club – Roundhay Runners.
- Leeds rowing club have one of their two boathouses on the lake.
- Bonfire Night - a fireworks display was held annually, however, this event has not been held since 2019.

=== List of concerts ===
The park has regularly been used as a concert venue.

Date	Tours / Event Name	Band	Attendance	Reference
25 July 1982	The Rolling Stones European Tour 1982	The Rolling Stones with the J. Geils Band, George Thorogood and Joe Jackson supporting	120,000+	
29 August 1983		Gary Glitter		
7 July 1985	Born in the U.S.A. Tour	Bruce Springsteen	80,000	
28 June 1987	Invisible Touch Tour	Genesis with Paul Young supporting		
15 August 1987	Who's That Girl World Tour	Madonna with Hue and Cry supporting	73,000	
29 August 1988	Bad World Tour	Michael Jackson	90,000	
23 July 1989	Street Fighting Years Tour	Simple Minds with All About Eve and Martin Stephenson and the Daintees supporting	80,000	
31 July 1992	We Can't Dance Tour	Genesis with Lisa Stansfield supporting		
16 August 1992	Dangerous World Tour	Michael Jackson	90,000	
14 August 1993	Zoo TV Tour	U2 with Marxman and Stereo MCs supporting	120000+	
7–10 July 1994	Heineken Music Festival	Various including Siouxsie and the Banshees, the Saw Doctors, the Stranglers, the Wedding Present, Chumbawamba, Kingmaker, Elastica, Back to the Planet, Buzzcocks, Mike + The Mechanics, the Pogues. Oysterband		Heineken Music Festival
20–23 July 1995	Heineken Music Festival	Various including Siouxsie and the Banshees, Aswad, Tom Robinson, Squeeze, Michelle Shocked, the Chieftains, Pop Will Eat Itself, John Otway, Pulp, Sleeper, Kirsty MacColl, Bitty McLean, Menswear, Marion, Powder, Salad, Shane MacGowan and The Popes, Aswad, Goats Don't Shave		
28 August 1997	PopMart Tour	U2 with Cast supporting	53,917	
8 July 2000	Love Parade	Various including Carl Cox, Danny Rampling, Dave Pearce, David Morales, Sasha, Timo Maas	300,000	
8–9 September 2006	Close Encounters Tour	Robbie Williams with Orson and Basement Jaxx supporting	138,000	
17 September 2016	On Roundhay	Various including James, Primal Scream, Wolf Alice, Max Jury, the Haggis Horns		
16–17 August 2019	÷ Tour	Ed Sheeran with the Darkness and Lewis Capaldi supporting	150,000	

== See also ==
- Listed buildings in Leeds (Roundhay Ward)
