= Listed buildings in Leeds (Roundhay Ward) =

Roundhay is a ward in the metropolitan borough of the City of Leeds, West Yorkshire, England. It contains 50 listed buildings that are recorded in the National Heritage List for England. Of these, one is listed at Grade II*, the middle of the three grades, and the others are at Grade II, the lowest grade. The ward is to the northeast of the centre of Leeds, and includes the suburbs of Roundhay, Gledhow, and Oakwood. The ward is mainly residential, and most of the listed buildings are houses, cottages and associated structures, farmhouses and farm buildings. The other listed buildings include an open-air bath, a bridge, schools, a hotel, churches and a gravestone in a churchyard, a folly, a row of almshouses, a hospital, a drinking fountain, a shop, and a clock tower.

== Key ==
Grade	Criteria
II*	Particularly important buildings of more than special interest
II	Buildings of national importance and special interest

== Buildings ==
Name and location	Photograph	Date	Notes	Grade
Barn southwest of Roundhay Grange; 53.83488°N 1.47617°W	—	16th century	The barn, which has been restored after a fire, is timber framed and encased in stone, and has a corrugated asbestos roof. There are four bays and an aisle with a central cart entry on the south. The stonework includes gritstone, sandstone, and limestone, and some of the timber framing is exposed.	II
Gipton Spa; 53.82211°N 1.51570°W		17th century	An open-air bath that was probably rebuilt in about 1800, it is in gritstone with a stone slate roof. It consists of a bath house with a plunge bath on the south side, about 3 metres (9.8 ft) square, with a platform on three sides, enclosed by a high wall. The bath house has a doorway with quoined jambs, a moulded string course, and a coped gable containing a circular window. On the lintel is an inscribed metal plaque.	II
Roundhay Grange and barn to south 53.83544°N 1.47613°W	—	17th century	The barn is the older building, the farmhouse dating from the late 18th century. They are in gritstone, the barn has a timber framed core, and the roofs are of stone slate. The farmhouse has two storeys, five bays, and a two-bay wing to the south. On the east front is a porch with tri-stone jambs, and a shallow pointed lintel with carved spandrels, and the windows are sashes. The wing has a chamfered plinth, windows, and a pigeon loft and perch.	II
Cobble Hall; 53.83970°N 1.48372°W		Mid 18th century (probable)	The house is in stone, the walls are faced with small cobblestones, and it has quoins and an embattled parapet. There are two storeys, three bays, the middle entrance bay projecting, and a lower two-storey rear service wing. The doorway and windows have pointed arches, and at the rear is a stair window with a pointed arch.	II
Pair of cottages northeast of Cobble Hall; 53.83981°N 1.48343°W		Mid 18th century	A pair of stone cottages with quoins and a tile roof. There are two storeys and three bays. The doorways are paired in the centre and have tie-stone jambs, the windows are almost square, and all the openings have plain surrounds.	II
Barn and outbuildings west of Roundhay Grange; 53.83515°N 1.47648°W	—	Mid to late 18th century	A barn and a byre with a former cart shed, they are in stone with quoins, and roofs of stone slate and corrugated asbestos. The barn has four bays, and it contains a blocked segmental-headed cart entry, doorways and slit vents. The former cart sheds are painted and have about five bays.	II
Gledhow Hall; 53.82883°N 1.52195°W		1766	A large house that was extended in 1885–90 and later divided, it is in stone, with chamfered quoins, cornices, a balustraded parapet, and a hipped roof in slate and lead. There are two storeys and cellars. The south front consists of two two-storey canted bay windows, with three bays between them containing sash windows with moulded architraves. The central doorway has a Gibbs surround, a fanlight and a pediment. The later extension at the rear has three bays, two pairs of Ionic columns forming a loggia, and a porch in the corner with Tuscan columns, over which is an oriel window.	II*
Bridge over Gledhow Lane; 53.82945°N 1.52290°W		1768	The bridge carries a footpath over Gledhow Lane. It is in stone and consists of a single elliptical arch. The bridge has an initialled and dated keystone.	II
Moor Allerton School; 53.84005°N 1.52309°W		Late 18th century	A country house, later a school, it is stuccoed and has a hipped slate roof. There are two storeys, a central range of three bays with a balustraded parapet, flanked by bowed bays with three windows. In the centre is a porch with Tuscan columns and an entablature, and the windows are sashes in moulded architraves.	II
The Roundhay Fox; 53.83956°N 1.50411°W		c. 1800	A row of five cottages converted into a public house, and on the left is a rear range of a stable and barn, and single-storey kitchen buildings. The building is in gritstone with hipped stone slate roofs. The main range has two storeys and five bays, the middle bay pedimented. On the front are porches, blocked doorways with tie-stone jambs, and windows, some casements and others sashes. In the rear range is a large flat cart arch with a quoined surround and voussoirs, and three square windows, one a sliding sash.	II
Elmete Hall; 53.83399°N 1.48689°W		c. 1815	A large house, rebuilt and extended in 1865, it is in stone and white brick, with decorative bands, a balustraded parapet, and slate roofs. There are two storeys and an irregular plan. The west entrance front has three bays, the middle bay projecting as an almost complete octagon. The doorway has a carved surround and an open pediment with a shield, a motto, and a date plaque, and above it is an oriel window. The south front has five bays, the right three bays recessed. It contains a large canted bay window, in the fourth bay is a gablet containing a bust, and a pyramidal roof with a wrought iron finial. Over the right bay is an ornate pinnacle.	II
The Mansion Hotel; 53.83961°N 1.49964°W		By 1816	A large house, later a hotel, in stone with corner pilasters, an entablature, a cornice, a parapet, and a slate roof. There are two storeys, a front of seven bays, and a rear service wing with five bays. In the middle three bays on the front is a portico with four giant fluted Ionic columns, and a pediment. The ground floor windows are French casements, and in the upper floor are sash windows. In the left return is an Ionic porch with a moulded cornice and a blocking course, to the right is a two-storey segmental bay window, and to the left is a conservatory. The right return contains an Ionic porch and a bay window.	II
Oakwood Nursing Home and Oak House; 53.82605°N 1.50300°W	—	1820–40	A pair of houses, later extended to the rear, and used for other purposes. They are in stone with quoin pilasters, wide eaves with paired brackets, and a hipped slate roof. The right part has three bays, a band, sash windows, and a central porch with fluted Doric columns and an entablature. The part to the left has seven bays with a canted bay window in the centre, and a porch to the right with fluted Tuscan columns. The garden front at the rear has a two-storey canted bay window on the right and a two-storey bow window on the left. The rear wing has four bays and contains a porch with an architrave, a cornice, and a blocking course.	II
Coach house and stables, Roundhay Park; 53.83957°N 1.50307°W		1821	The coach house and stables, later used for other purposes, are in stone with quoin pilasters, bands, and a hipped slate roof. There are two storeys and nine bays, the middle three bays projecting under a pediment. In the centre are two elliptical-headed carriage entries, and in the outer bays are arcades of three round-arched windows and doorways. The upper floor contains square windows, and in the centre is a plaque with a moulded surround. In the centre of the roof is a clock tower with Tuscan columns, and an ogee dome with an ornate wrought iron weathervane.	II
St John's Church; 53.83049°N 1.48942°W		1824–26	The church was designed by Thomas Taylor in Gothic Revival style, and the chancel was extended, and a vestry added, in 1885. It is built in stone with a slate roof, and has a cruciform plan, consisting of a nave, north and south aisles, a south porch, north and south transepts, a chancel, and a west steeple. The steeple has a tower with three stages, buttresses, a moulded parapet, and a broach spire with lucarnes. The windows in the church are lancets.	II
18 Oakwood Lane, gates and railings 53.82654°N 1.50273°W	—	Early 19th century	A former lodge in stone with a hipped slate roof. There is a single storey and a splayed corner containing a sash window. In the left return is a doorway with a fanlight and another window. On the left, flanking the drive, are octagonal gate piers with cornices and shallow pointed capstones, and railings to the right.	II
Beechwood, wall and gate piers 53.83262°N 1.48287°W	—	Early 19th century	A house, later used for other purposes, it is in stone with pilaster quoins, a band, a blocking course, a cornice, and a hipped slate roof. There are two storeys, the main block has fronts of five and two bays, there is a recessed rear wing with sides of four and two bays, and at the north is a courtyard range. On the front is a porch with Tuscan columns, an entablature, and a cornice, and the windows are sashes. In the rear courtyard are round-arched doorways, a segmental carriage arch, a high wall, and monolithic gate piers with segmental-arched capstones.	II
Farm buildings east of Cobble Hall; 53.83972°N 1.48296°W		Early 19th century	The farm buildings are in gritstone with roofs of stone slate and corrugated asbestos. They have one and two storeys, and form three ranges round a farmyard. The buildings include barns, byres, stables, a granary, and a dovecote.	II
Eller Close; 53.82677°N 1.49345°W		Early 19th century	A house, later flats, in stone, with a band, a cornice and blocking course, and a hipped slate roof. There are two storeys and seven bays. In the centre is a porch with two fluted Doric columns and two square piers, an entablature, and a doorway with side lights. The window above the porch is a casement with an architrave and a cornice, and the other windows are sashes.	II
Hollin Hill House; 53.82299°N 1.49661°W	—	Early 19th century	A stone house, later divided, with a hipped slate roof. There are two storeys, three bays, and recessed wings. On the front is a central doorway with an architrave, a fanlight, and a cornice, and the windows are casements. At the rear is a porch, an outshut, and a central round-headed staircase window.	II
Lodges, gates, piers, walls and bollards, Roundhay Park; 53.83063°N 1.49411°W		Early 19th century	Flanking the southern entrance to the park are a pair of stone lodges, each with a single storey, three bays, pilasters, and an entablature with a cornice and blocking course. The windows are in round-arched niches, and the doorway has pilasters and an entablature. The gate piers are about 3 metres (9.8 ft) high, with pilasters, cornices and flat capstones. The gates are in cast iron, stone walls flank the lodges, and along the curve of the approach road are chamfered conical stone bollards.	II
Mansion Cottage, Roundhay Park; 53.83951°N 1.50340°W		Early 19th century	A house and outbuilding in gritstone, with red brick in the left return, and a roof of stone slate at the front and blue slate at the rear. There are two storeys, two bays, and a single-storey bay on the right. The windows are casements, and at the rear is a blocked cart entrance with a flat arch and voussoirs, converted into a stable door and window.	II
Park Cottages; 53.84007°N 1.50364°W		Early 19th century	A row of seven houses in gritstone with corner pilasters, a string course, and a slate roof. There are two storeys and a basement, and eleven bays. The basement is arcaded, and in the upper floors are sash windows divided by pilasters.	II
Queensmead and Woodlands; 53.82841°N 1.50802°W	—	Early 19th century	A house, later divided, in gritstone with slate roofs, and two storeys. Woodlands has a hipped roof, five bays, a two-storey canted bay window, sash windows with wedge lintels, and a doorway with a fanlight. Queensmead has three bays, a porch and a round-headed stair window.	II
Cottages east of the former Stable Wine Bar; 53.83940°N 1.50381°W	—	Early 19th century	Farm buildings converted into cottages in the 20th century, they are in gritstone with stone slate roofs. There are two storeys and four bays, the right two bays taller. In the right part is a blocked flat cart arch with voussoirs, two doorways with fanlights, and square windows. The left part contains two doorways with plain surrounds and two square windows.	II
The Castle, Roundhay Park; 53.84082°N 1.49356°W	cnetre	Early 19th century	A folly in the form of a ruined sham castle in stone. It consists of a pointed archway with a hood mould, flanked by circular embattled turrets containing mock arrow slits. Above the archway is a window with Gothic tracery.	II
Wall, gate and gate piers, St John's Church; 53.83003°N 1.48942°W	—	c. 1830	The wall enclosing the south boundary of the churchyard is in gritstone with moulded coping, it is about 2 metres (6 ft 7 in) high, and it extends for about 70 metres (230 ft). At the west end are square gate piers with pointed recessed panels, and moulding below pyramidal capstones. The gates are in wrought iron.	II
St John's House; 53.82989°N 1.48839°W	—	1833	A vicarage, later a private house, it is in gritstone, with a moulded string course, wide eaves, and a slate roof with gables and ornate bargeboards with pendants. There are two storeys, and on the front and left return are two-storey bay windows with coved cornices. The windows are mullioned and transomed with hood moulds, and the chimneys are octagonal and grouped with embattled caps.	II
St John's School and Almshouses; 53.82975°N 1.48917°W		1833	The building, designed by Thomas Taylor, forms a long range, with the school in the centre, flanked by the almshouses; it is in gritstone with slate roofs, and has a single storey. The school has a porch with a coped gable, a doorway with a pointed arch, mullioned and transomed windows, and the base of a crocketed finial. On each side, the almshouses form ten bays, and each house has mullioned windows and a doorway with a hood mould. The end bays project and have gables with ornate bargeboards and pendants.	II
Wall, gate piers and gates, St John's School and Almshouses; 53.82964°N 1.48931°W	—	c. 1833	The wall is in gritstone with moulded coping, it encloses the west and south sides of the grounds, it is between 1 metre (3 ft 3 in) and 2 metres (6 ft 7 in) high, and extends for about 150 metres (490 ft). The gateway opposite the entrance to the school has two pairs of gate piers with shallow capstones. At the west end are two pairs of piers with curved walls between them, and each has a moulded plinth, sides with recessed panels, and a gabled capstone. In the west part of the wall is a gateway with plain jambs and a wrought iron gate, and at the end of the wall is a pier with panelled sides, moulding, and a pyramidal capstone.	II
Grove House; 53.82654°N 1.49226°W		1839	A large house, later divided, it is in stone, with a cornice and blocking course, and a hipped slate roof. There are two storeys, and three bays. The central doorway has attached Tuscan columns, a semicircular fanlight, and an entablature, and the windows are sashes. At the rear is a semicircular bay window.	II
Roundhay Hall Hospital; 53.83260°N 1.51434°W		1841–42	A large house converted into a hospital in 1989, it is in stone, rusticated in the centre, with corner pilasters, a string course, a sill band, a modillion eaves cornice, a blocking course, and a hipped slate roof. There are two storeys, and fronts of three bays. The west front has a central portico with giant Corinthian columns, a pediment with acroteria, and a doorway with a moulded architrave and a cornice on console brackets. The windows are casements with moulded architraves, those in the ground floor with cornices. In the middle bay of the right return is a semicircular bay window, with Corinthian pilasters, an entablature, and a parapet with cast iron panels forming a balcony.	II
Church Stream Cottage; 53.82992°N 1.49023°W	—	Mid 19th century	A stone house that has a slate roof with coped gables. There are two storeys and two bays. The doorway and windows have chamfered surrounds and hood moulds, and the windows are casements.	II
Stables, cottage, wall and gate piers, Gledhow Hall; 53.82929°N 1.52220°W		Mid 19th century	The stables are in gritstone with a hipped stone slate roof. There are two storeys, and they contain a central wide doorway with quoined jambs, two doorways with fanlights, a loading door, and sash windows. On the roof is a clock turret with a ribbed base, round clock faces in moulded surrounds with pediments, over which is an open cupola with an ogee dome and a tall ornate finial. To the north is a taller cottage, and to the south is a linking wall with moulded coping and a pair of monolithic gate piers with banded pyramidal capstones.	II
Gledhow Lodge; 53.82506°N 1.51510°W		Mid 19th century	A house later expanded and used for other purposes, it is in stone with a hipped slate roof. There are two storeys, the original range has three bays, there is a recessed lower wing to the left with four bays, and a further wing on the right added in the 20th century. The centre bay projects slightly, and its ground floor projects further and has a balcony with railings. It contains a doorway with pilasters and a pediment. The windows are sashes, those in the ground floor with moulded architraves. In the left wing are ground-floor niches with inserted windows.	II
South Lodge, Roundhay Hall Hospital; 53.83010°N 1.51568°W		Mid 19th century	The lodge at the southern entrance to the grounds is in stone with wide coved eaves, and a slate roof with the gable ends treated as pediments. There is a single storey and three bays. In the middle bay is a semicircular bay window with three lights and a projecting conical roof on slim columns. The windows are sashes with round-arched heads, and at the west end is a pedimented porch with a round-arched doorway.	II
Gate piers and wall, South Lodge, Roundhay Hall Hospital; 53.83008°N 1.51592°W		Mid 19th century	The gate piers flanking the entrance to the drive are in stone with a rectangular section. Each pier is about 2 metres (6 ft 7 in) high, on a high plinth, with panelled sides and wide capstones. The attached curving walls are about 4 metres (13 ft) long with ridged coping.	II
Gate piers, gates and railings, Roundhay Park; 53.83848°N 1.50492°W	—	c. 1872	At the entrance on the west side of the park are three pairs of piers. They are in stone and have pilaster quoins, and square capstones with wrought iron scrolled finials. The gates and railings are in wrought iron.	II
Former North Leeds School; 53.82788°N 1.51344°W		1873	The school, later used as a nursery, is in stone on a chamfered plinth, and has a Welsh slate roof with coped gables. There is a single storey and four bays, the right bay projecting and gabled. In each bay is a three-light window, the lights with cusped heads, stepped in the right bay. On the left gable end is a bellcote with a cross finial.	II
Garage and outbuildings, Gledhow Hall; 53.82918°N 1.52197°W		Late 19th century	The garage and outbuildings are in stone with a slate roof. On the south side is an ornate glazed iron-framed canopy with ornate scrolled brackets. The wooden garage doors are glazed.	II
Barran's Fountain; 53.83703°N 1.49469°W		1882	The drinking fountain in Roundhay Park is in the form of a Classical rotunda, and was designed by Thomas Ambler. It is in stone, and consists of eight Corinthian columns carrying an entablature with a dome. In each of the alternating intervals between the columns is a round-headed shell niche containing a gadrooned bowl in pink marble facing outside, and a fluted bowl in a moulded niche facing inside.	II
The Lodge, piers, walls and railings 53.82649°N 1.51826°W	—	1885–90	The lodge to Gledhow Hall is in gritstone with a moulded eaves cornice, gutter brackets, and a slate roof with coped gables. There are two storeys, and sides of two bays. In the left bay is a porch with a round arch and a keystone, over which is a balustrade. The right bay projects, it has a pediment, and contains a canted bay window, with a four-centred arched window above containing sashes. In the right return are segmental-arched windows. Attached is a low wall with moulded coping and railings. There are four gate piers about 2.5 metres (8 ft 2 in) high, each with a square section, a plinth, oval panels, a cornice, and a capstone, one with a cast iron lamp base.	II
Gravestone of Joseph and Sarah Whitley; 53.83059°N 1.48961°W	—	1889	The gravestone is set into the churchyard wall of St John's Church. It has a sandstone frame, and across the centre is a decorative carved band carried on pink marble columns. Above is a semicircular arch with carving including two Gothic arches and two fleurs-de-lys. Below, between the columns, are inscribed bronze plaques with moulded edges. In the side panels and in the area outside the arch are decorative painted tiles in Arts and Crafts style by Louis Le Prince. The tiles on the sides depict urns, and above the arch they contain a calvary, crossed swords and an inscription.	II
The Oakwood Fish Bar; 53.82705°N 1.50518°W		c. 1890	The shop, which was altered in about 1938–40, has three storeys, the upper two storeys in stone with a shaped gable, containing a mullioned and transomed window in each floor. The ground floor has a shop front in Vitrolite, metal, glass and bakelite. On the right is a large circular window, with a doorway to the left, and above is a lettered frieze.	II
Lidgett Park Methodist Church Sunday School; 53.83742°N 1.51738°W		1903–6	The Sunday school, later a church hall, is in gritstone, and has a grey slate roof with coped gables. There is a single storey, five bays, and a wing on the right. In the left bay is a gabled porch, the windows have two lights, and in the wing is a four-light mullioned and transomed window.	II
Clock tower 53.82755°N 1.50551°W		1904	The Oakwood Clock Tower was moved to its present site at the south end of Roundhay Park in 1912. The tower is in stone, it is square and slender, and has panelled sides, a round-headed niche, and a bracketed cornice. At the top are clock faces and rusticated Ionic corner pilasters, over which is a scrolled pediment with winged beasts at the corners, and an octagonal cupola with a finial. Around the base is a tiled shelter.	II
St Edmund's Church; 53.83821°N 1.51564°W		1907	The church was built in stages, the nave first, followed by the southeast chapel in 1925, and the chancel in 1935. It is in stone with red tile roofs, and consists of a nave, north and south porches, a chancel with a south chapel, and a stair turret in the angle with a short spire and a finial, and a squat unfinished southeast tower with diagonal buttresses rising to hipped roofs, and a pyramidal roof.	II
St Andrew's Church and Sunday school 53.84046°N 1.51218°W		1907–08	The church and Sunday school are in gritstone with red tile roofs. The church consists of a nave, transepts, a chancel with a polygonal apse, and a tower, and is in Perpendicular style. The tower has three stages, gabled buttresses rising to pinnacles, a segmental-arched doorway, clock faces, and a moulded parapet. The Sunday school, attached to the church, has one storey and two bays, and contains a large four-light window.	II
Wall and gate piers, St Andrew's Church; 53.84037°N 1.51182°W	—	c. 1907–08	The wall enclosing the churchyard and the grounds of the Sunday school is in gritstone, with coping, and extends for about 100 metres (330 ft). There are three pairs of stone gate piers, each about 0/5 metre (0 ft) high, with a chamfered plinth, a square shaft with a carved recess, and a gabled capstone.	II
Lidgett Park Methodist Church; 53.83756°N 1.51729°W		1926	The church is in stone and red brick with a grey slate roof. It consists of a nave, twin gabled north and south transepts, a canted porch, and a slim northeast tower. The tower has corner buttresses rising to flat-topped pinnacles, and a shaped panelled parapet.	II
