= Heineken Music Festival =

In the early to mid-1990s Heineken sponsored free admission four-day live music events in the United Kingdom in and around large capacity big top tents in Heineken green, designed by Rudi Enos. Originally named The Heineken Music Big Top the name changed to The Heineken Music Festival in 1992, with the introduction of additional stages.

Taking place in city parks up and down the UK, the first event was held in Wollaton Park, Nottingham in 1990 headlined by John Martyn and Tom Robinson. It was co-promoted by Nottingham City Council. Other regular venues included Swansea, Brighton, Portsmouth and Leeds. Also Bristol, Norwich, Gateshead, Sheffield and Greater Manchester.

Heineken Music Festivals featured r&b, pub rock, punk, folk-rock, world music and rock.

From 1993 leading "Britpop" indie bands featured on Saturday evenings including Oasis, The Verve featuring Richard Ashcroft, Bluetones, Pulp, Pop Will Eat Itself, Sleeper, Manic Street Preachers, Blur, Chumbawamba and Catatonia.

The Heineken events also featured long-established bands and singers including The Stranglers, Jools Holland and his Rhythm and Blues Orchestra, The Pogues, Saw Doctors, Tom Robinson Band, The Men They Couldn't Hang, Bonnie Tyler, Richard Thompson, The Damned, Labi Siffre, Siouxsie + The Banshees, Squeeze, Carmel, The Levellers, Martin Stephenson and the Daintees, Steve Harley and Cockney Rebel, Wilko Johnson, Tony Joe White, Aswad, Bhundu Boys, Jamiroquai, Kirsty MacColl, Boy George, Mike + The Mechanics. In total there were thirty free admission festivals over six years as well as several pilot events, and six indoor venue gigs in London.

There were also spin-off events and college tours. Standout being the Murphys Tours with Energy Orchard and Toss the Feathers across the UK. Respective city councils co-promoted the events.

Granada Television broadcast a Greater Manchester event and many other festivals achieved tv coverage. BBC4’s Hype and Hustle featured Blur at the Heineken events.

Regular house-bands included Dr Feelgood, Alias Ron Kavana, The Tansads (now Merry Hell), Oysterband, Seven Little Sisters and Chumbawamba.

Event director and promoter was Mike Eddowes, formerly head of promotions at Capital Radio in London and publicist to Elton John and Paul McCartney amongst others.

Bookers included Fiona Glyn-Jones (later Bella Union record label) and in season one Stuart Griffiths and Carrie Wagner. Event managers were Linda Harley, Miles Beacroft, Adam Ali, Gabby Taranowski, Charlie Connelly (now an author and tv presenter) and Tim Haines. PA was by ESS. The events were promoted and produced by Square One Events and sponsored by Heineken.

The last event under Heineken's sponsorship was held in Roundhay Park Leeds in July 1995, which attracted 110,000 fans on the Saturday and more than 320,000 fans over four days and was headlined by Pulp, who also headlined at Glastonbury that year. More than one million cans of Heineken lager were sold at the farewell event. It claims to be the largest ever free music event in the UK.

At the end of 1995 Heineken didn't renew their ground-breaking sponsorship, in favour of sport.

Various events continue in England and continental Europe under different names but are now paid admission shows and festivals.

== 1994 ==
In 1994 there were six free festivals taking place at various locations in the United Kingdom featuring the following artists:

Preston (9–12 June)
- Inspiral Carpets
- The Boo Radleys
- Pulp
- Shed Seven
- The Christians
- Sister Sledge
- Back to the Planet
- Baby Chaos

Gateshead (23–26 June)
- The Pogues
- The Stranglers
- Tom Robinson
- Jools Holland
- Toyah
- Nine Below Zero

Leeds (7–10 July)
- The Saw Doctors
- The Stranglers
- The Wedding Present
- Chumbawamba
- Kingmaker
- Shed Seven replaced the billed Elastica
- Back to the Planet
- Siouxsie and the Banshees
- Buzzcocks
- Mike + The Mechanics
- The Pogues

Nottingham (21–24 July)
- Blur

Plymouth (4–7 August)
- Chumbawamba
- The Stranglers
- Toyah
- Tom Robinson

Portsmouth (18–21 August)
- The Pogues
