= As the Old Sang, So the Young Pipe =

As the Old Sang (or Sing), So the Young Pipe may refer to the paintings:

- As the Old Sang, So the Young Pipe (Jordaens, Antwerp)
- As the Old Sang, So the Young Pipe (Jordaens, Valenciennes)
- As the Old Sing, So Pipe the Young (Jan Steen)
