= Samson Mocked =

Painting by Jan Steen

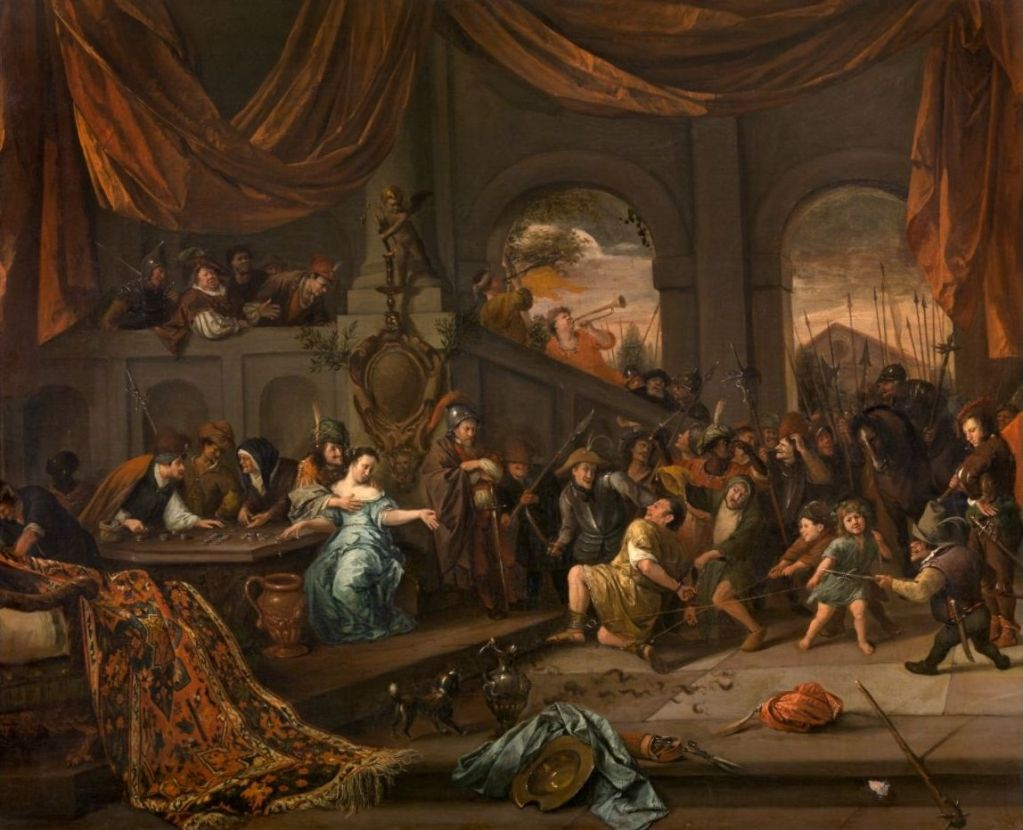
Samson Mocked (c. 1670) by Jan Steen

Samson Mocked or The Mockery of Samson is an oil-on-canvas painting by Jan Steen, created c. 1670, now in the Museum of Fine Arts, Antwerp.

It appeared in an 18th-century auction catalogue described as "a painting of Samson bound by the Philistines, by Jan Steen, very good and with rare ideas". From the 1940s until 2018 it was thought to be an 18th-century copy by Ignatius de Roore of a work by Steen. It was investigated and restored at the Mauritshuis in The Hague in 2018 and reattributed back to Steen.
