= Guðlaugsson =

Guðlaugsson or Gudlaugsson is a surname. Notable people with the surname include:

- Birgir Guðlaugsson (1941–2007), Icelandic cross-country skier
- Janus Guðlaugsson (born 1955), Icelandic former footballer
- Páll Guðlaugsson (born 1958), Icelandic football coach and former footballer
- Sturla Gudlaugsson (1913–1971), Danish-born Dutch art historian
