= Interior with an Old Woman and a Young Boy =

Painting by the Dutch painter Jan Steen

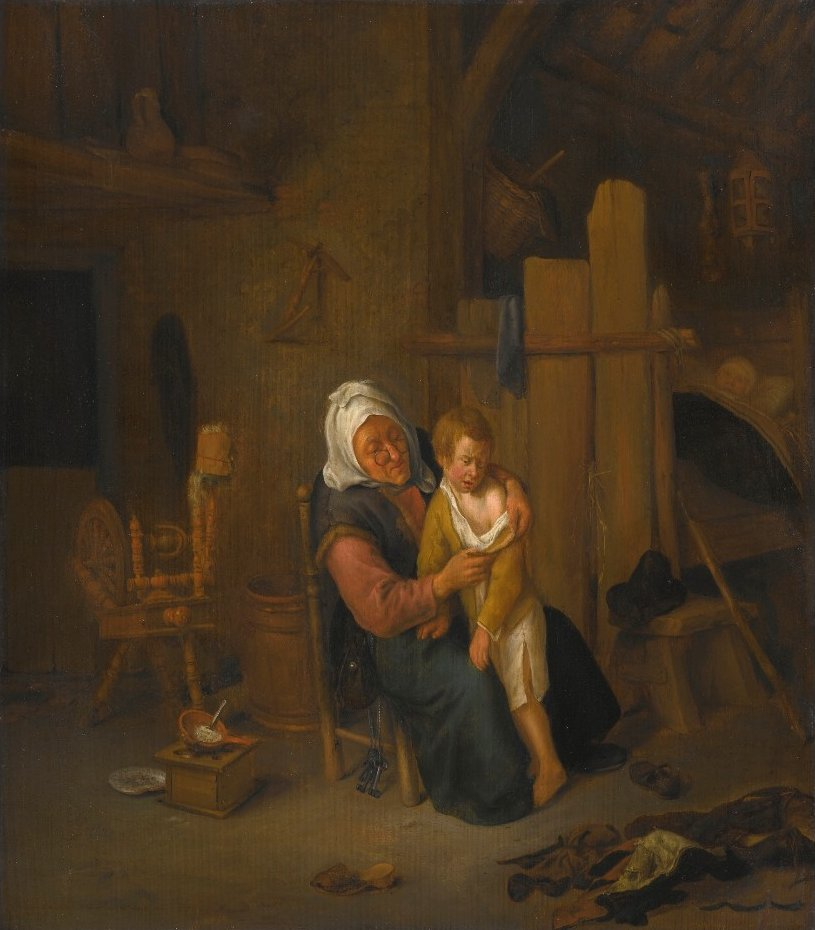
- Artist: Jan Steen
- Year: c. 1656–1660
- Medium: Oil on panel
- Dimensions: 41 cm × 35.8 cm (16 in × 14.1 in)
- Location: private collection

Interior with an Old Woman and a Young Boy is an oil-on-panel painting executed c.1656–1660 by Jan Steen and now in a private collection.

Initially identified in the Hague as an anonymous copy by Macalester Loup, it was probably bought in the Hague by Johan Gabriel Schwarzmann (1739–1812). After his death he left it to Maria Anna Schwarzmann (1778–1847), wife of Pierre Bartholomeus van den Hove (1763–1839). They left it to their daughter Anna Maria Ludicova van den Hove (1822–1855), wife of Eduard Theodor Leon Speyart van Woerden (1813–1881). It was then inherited by Cornelius Ludovicus Maria Emilius Joannes Eduard Speyart van Woerden (1849–1911) and left by him to another private owner. On 9 June 2015 it was auctioned at Sotheby's in London as "property from a Dutch noble collection".
