= Wine is a Mocker =

Painting by the Dutch painter Jan Steen

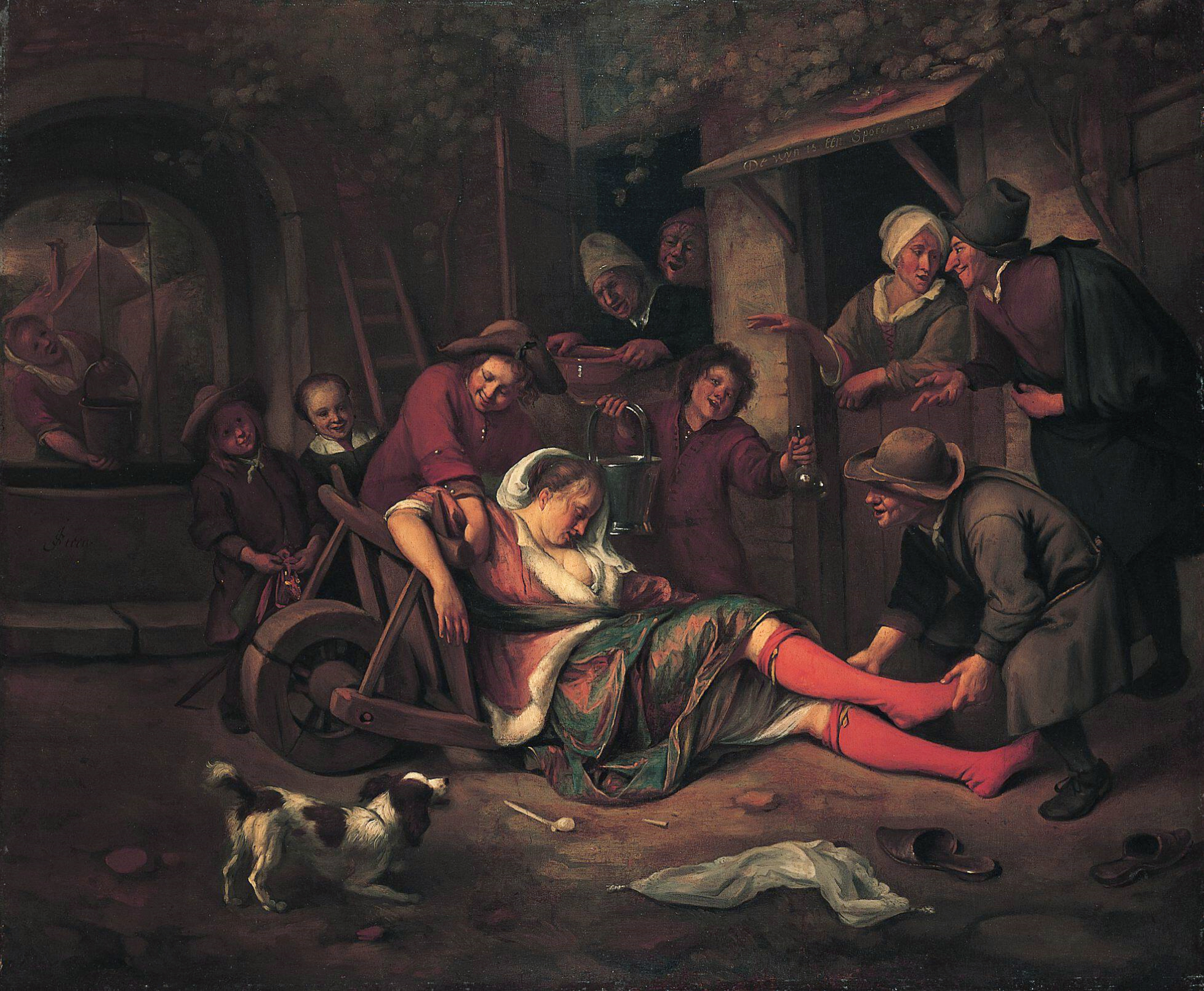
- Artist: Jan Steen
- Year: 1663–1664
- Medium: Oil on canvas
- Dimensions: 87.3 cm × 104.8 cm (34.4 in × 41.3 in)
- Location: Norton Simon Museum, Pasadena

Wine is a Mocker is an oil-on-canvas painting by the Dutch artist Jan Steen, created in 1663–1664, now in the Norton Simon Museum in Pasadena, California. Its title is drawn from a biblical proverb.

The canvas depicts a scene outside an inn where a well-dressed drunken woman is about to be carried home in a wheelbarrow. The proverb, written above the door of the inn, reads: "Wine is a mocker, strong drink a brawler and whosoever is deceived thereby is not wise". The painting illustrates the point that no one, of whatever status, is immune from the unedifying effects of strong drink. Steen, who ran a tavern himself, would be well acquainted with such debauchery.
