= The Feast of Saint Nicholas =

Painting by Jan Steen

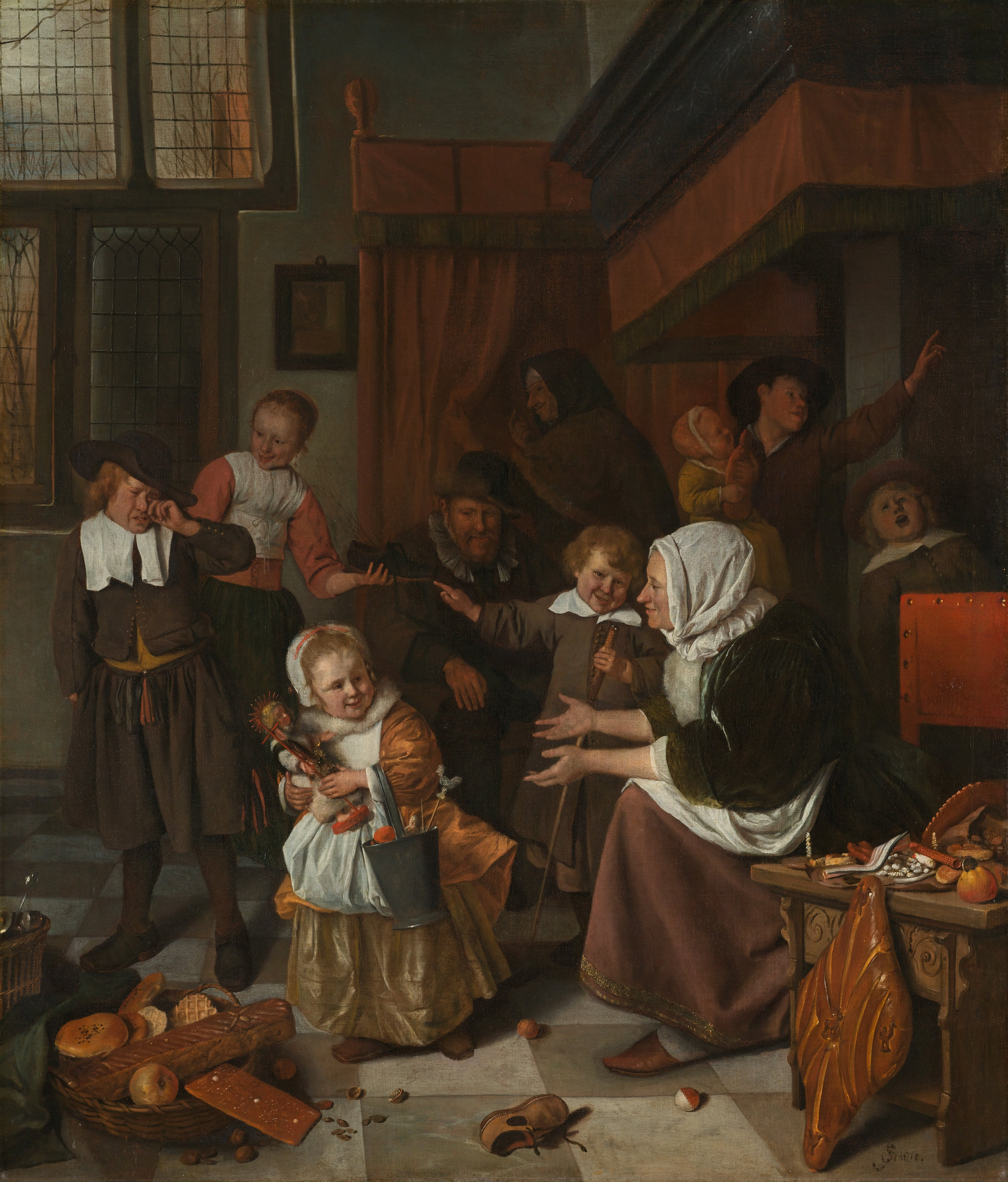
- Artist: Jan Steen
- Year: c. 1665–1668
- Medium: Oil on canvas
- Dimensions: 82 cm × 70.5 cm (33 1/2 in × 27 in)
- Location: Rijksmuseum; Amsterdam

The Feast of Saint Nicholas (Dutch: Het Sint-Nicolaasfeest) is an oil-on-canvas painting executed c. 1665–1668 by Dutch master Jan Steen, which is now in the Rijksmuseum in Amsterdam. It measures 82 x 70.5 cm. The picture, painted in the chaotic Jan Steen style, depicts a family at home on December 5, the night celebrated in the Netherlands as the Feast of Saint Nicholas, or Sinterklaas.

== Jan Steen and his contemporaries ==
Jan Steen was a Dutch genre painter of the 17th century. Dutch painting of the time, including the landscapes of Aelbert Cuyp and Jacob van Ruisdael, show a rustic intimacy that carried over into genre paintings of domestic scenes. The paintings of Jan Vermeer and Jan Steen detail the same sense of comfort in scenes from daily household life. As the Dutch economy thrived and the middle class of wealthy merchants grew, such domestic paintings rose in popularity. As the middle class became the new patrons of art, traditional religious and historical subjects lost favor to household scenes that chronicle the lives of Dutch families of the time.

== Painting in the Dutch Golden Age ==
Jan Steen falls in the greater category of the Baroque period in painting. Baroque painting in the Netherlands was different from that in other countries in that it did not have the same idealized finery and magnificent grandeur. Instead, the Dutch style can be identified by its focus on extreme detail and realism, different even from neighboring Flanders and the splendid Flemish baroque paintings.

Pictorial light: As they strived for extreme realism, Dutch Golden Age painters mastered the art of depicting the quality of light, particularly concentrating on the way that it behaved and reflected on various surfaces.

Domestic detail: The rise of oil paints in the 15th century made possible the reproduction of fine detail, allowing scenes to be rendered with unprecedented realism. The Feast of Saint Nicholas typifies this practice with—to take but one example—its woven wicker basket in the lower left corner, each strand minutely defined, overflowing with seasonal fare, glistening, and finely detailed, and scattered in careless abundance.

== The painting in detail ==
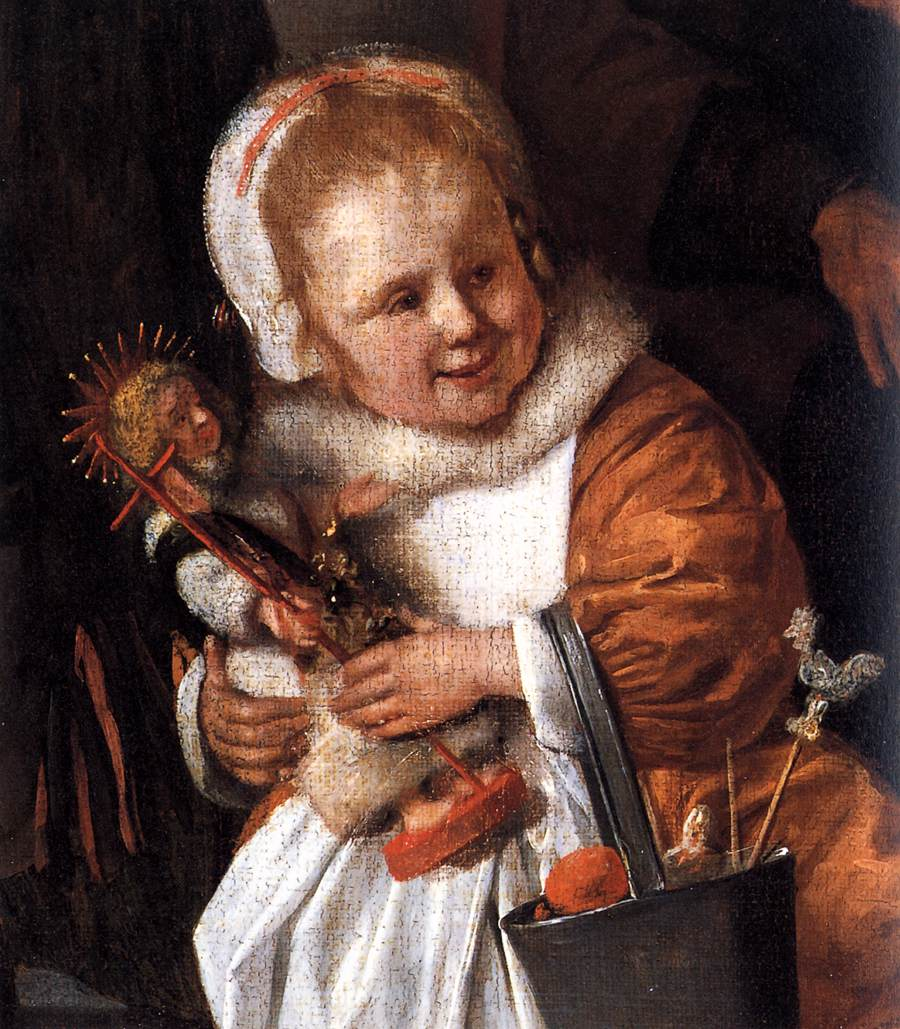
Detail of the painting with the youngest daughter holding her doll

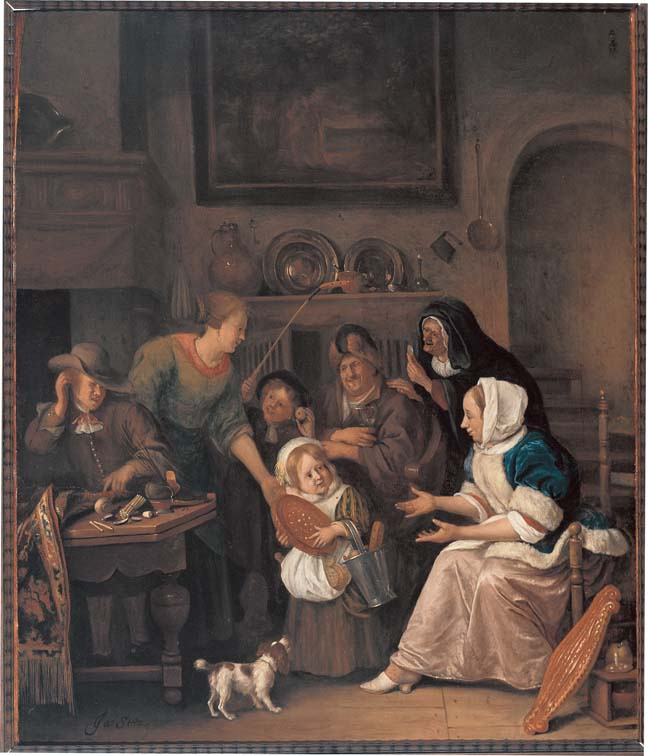
Two versions exist of Jan Steen's Sinterklaasavond. The best known copy of these (now kept in the Rijksmuseum Amsterdam) was made for a Catholic. The girl in the center was given a doll dressed up as a saint. In this version, apparently made for a Protestant, the girl was given a simple round piece of gingerbread. It is the Museum Catharijneconvent in Utrecht.

The focal point of the painting is the youngest daughter of the family, a golden-child, painted, in fact, in a golden smock and showing golden locks. She has behaved all year, and Saint Nicholas has rewarded her by stuffing her shoe with a doll and other treats, which she carries in her bucket. The "doll" is a representation of John the Baptist. The figure wears what appears to be a camel hair shirt and holds a long cross, both symbols tied to John the Baptist. Being the patron saint of epilepsy, the little girl's insistence on holding on to the figure may suggest she suffers from childhood convulsions or epilepsy. She is in stark contrast to her elder brother, standing to her right, who is sobbing, while another brother looks on, laughing. Apparently, the elder brother has been naughty, and his shoe, held up by an elder sister behind him, was left empty. Still there is hope for the sobbing boy. Hidden in the background, almost obscured by the draperies, his grandmother seems to beckon to him—perhaps she is hiding a gift for him too, behind the heavy curtains.

In the background, a boy holds a young child and points out to the youngster the chimney through which Saint Nicholas brought the gifts. His other brother is already singing a gleeful song of thanksgiving in appreciation of the gifts he has received.

The lower right hand corner of the painting actually reveals another popular style of painting. A basket of assorted traditional Saint Nicholas sweetmeats like honey cake, gingerbread, waffles, nuts, and apples is actually a miniature still life within the greater painting. Even more examples of the specially celebratory feasts of Christmastime appear on the left side of the foreground. The apple and the coin are references to the old tradition of giving hidden apples and coins to friends as presents. A special diamond shaped cake called a duivekater, leans up against the table and marks the special occasion. In another painting by Steen, the Leiden baker, this same pastry also appears.

The child near the chimney is holding a symbol of the struggle between Catholics and Protestants, a gingerbread man in the shape of St. Nicholas. The delicacy, still enjoyed around the fifth of December, was seen as an example of Catholic worship of saints and was not approved of by Protestant authorities. In the seventeenth century, the baking of such figures of saints (especially St. Nicholas) was banned. In 1655 in the city of Utrecht an ordinance was passed which forbade "the baking of likenesses in bread or cake".

== Steen's legacy ==
Unlike Vermeer’s paintings of the same era, Jan Steen’s conscious choice to portray the chaos and imperfections that dominated this domestic scene is a commentary on the society of the time. Through this painting and his sense of realism, Steen is able to highlight ongoing flaws and problems in society. A subtle form of commentary and criticism, Jan Steen paved the way for later artists like William Hogarth in his Marriage A La Mode series to use painting as a medium for satire.

== Sources ==
- "Old Dutch Masters. Jan Steen", in Century Magazine, December, 1893.
