= The Old Folks Sing, the Young Folks Chirp (Jordaens, Antwerp) =

Painting by Jacob Jordaens

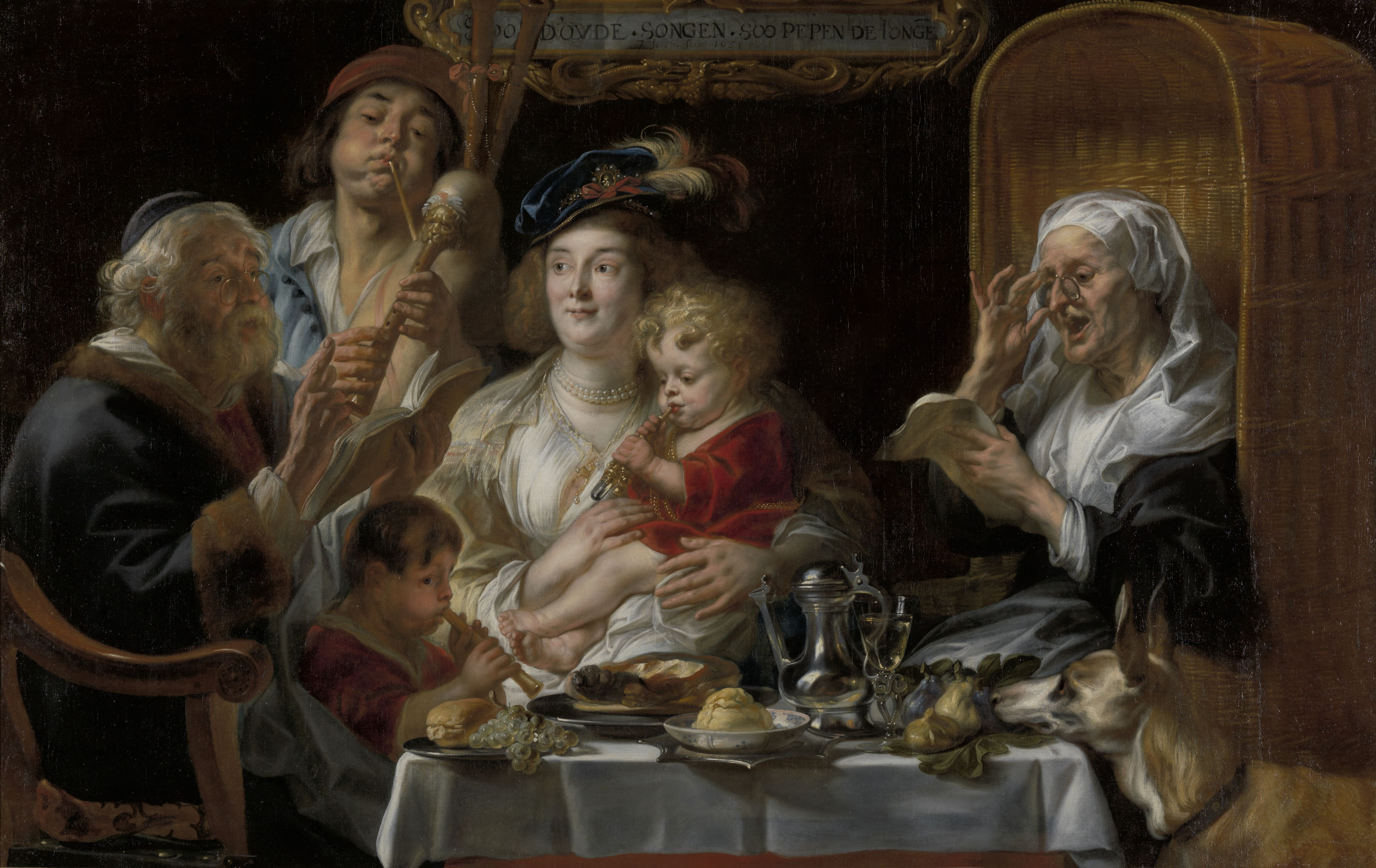
- Artist: Jacob Jordaens
- Year: 1638
- Medium: Oil on canvas
- Movement: Flemish Baroque
- Location: Royal Museum of Fine Arts; Antwerp

The Old Folks Sing, the Young Folks Chirp (Dutch: Zoals de ouden zongen, piepen de jongen) is a 1638–1640 oil-on-canvas painting by the Flemish artist Jacob Jordaens, now in the Royal Museum of Fine Arts Antwerp. He painted several works with this title, a Dutch proverb – this is the earliest of them, whilst another is now in Valenciennes.

== History ==
The painting is an expression of the age-old Dutch proverb 'Soo d'oude song soo pepen de jong'. The proverb can also be read at the top of the work. It means that the young always follow the example set by the old. Jordaens depicted the proverb several times in the course of his career. This painting, signed in 1638, is the earliest known version.

== Description ==
The painting shows a domestic scene of a family at a set table. In the center the mother is sitting with the baby on her lap. On the right, grandmother puts on her spectacles to read the lyrics of the song and sing along. On the left, the grandfather sits in an armchair singing along with a songbook in his hand. At the back the father blows with full force on a bagpipes. Not only the elderly make music, also the children participate. The baby blows on the whistle of his rattle and his big brother plays a recorder. Even the dog has pricked its ears to the sound of the music.

Jordaens has possibly depicted acquaintances from his surroundings in this family scene. In the old man one recognizes Adam van Noort, tutor and father in law of the painter. Jordaens drew various studies by Van Noort, making it easy to identify. There is less certainty about the other figures. It has been suggested that the piper might be Jordaens himself.

== Literature ==
- Marechal, Els., Devisscher, Hans., Huvenne, Paul., Koninklijk Museum voor Schone Kunsten (Antwerpen), Het museumboek : hoogtepunten uit de verzameling, Koninklijk Museum voor Schone Kunsten, Antwerpen, cop. 2003. ISBN 9053494405.
