= Woman at her Toilet (Steen) =

1663 painting by Jan Steen

A Woman at Her Toilet
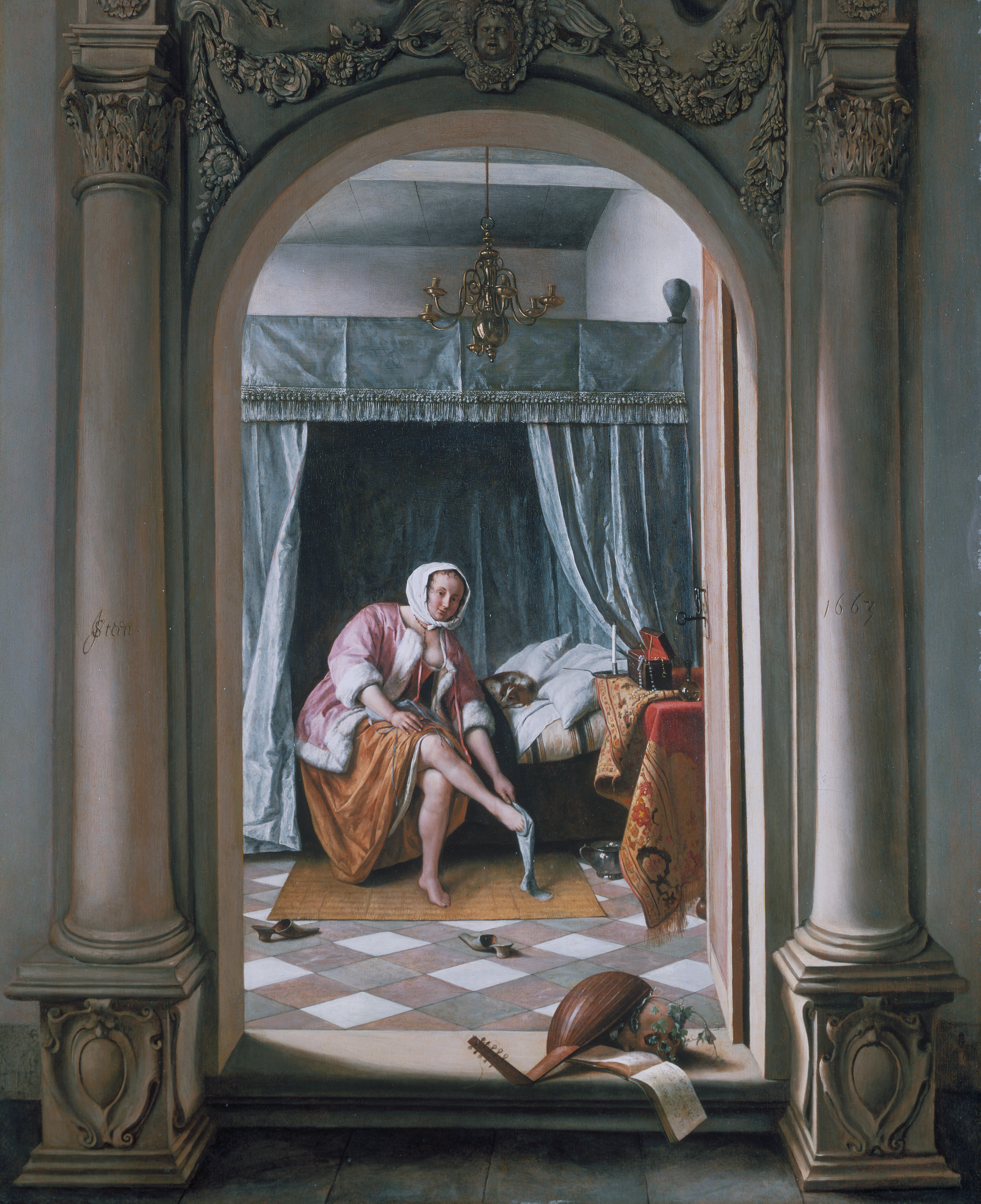
- Artist: Jan Steen
- Year: 1663
- Medium: Oil on panel
- Dimensions: 65.8 cm × 53 cm (25.9 in × 21 in)
- Location: Buckingham Palace, London

A Woman at her Toilet is an oil-on-panel painting by Jan Steen painted in 1663. Is now a part of the Royal Collection, having been acquired by King George IV in 1821. The painting is housed in Buckingham Palace.

The composition depicts a partly undressed woman, seated on her bed and putting on a stocking. She faces the viewer with a flirtatious gaze. An arched doorway intervenes between the woman and the viewer, bisecting the line of sight into two symbolically charged realms. Thus split, the two resulting spaces are populated with symbols familiar to Steen's contemporaries. The arch in the foreground "represents moral probity emphasised by the symbolism of the sunflower (constancy), the grapevines (domestic virtue) and the weeping cherub (chastised profane love)". In contrast, the room beyond the arch is the domain of vanity and profane love, symbolized by a skull, an extinguished candle, and a lute with a broken string. The painting is rich with sexual innuendo, some of it based on word play. For instance, the Dutch word for stocking (kous) was a slang term for fornication; the Dutch word for the chamber pot (piespot) below the bed can be combined with kous to form a derogatory word for women – pieskous.
