= The Dancing Couple =

1663 painting by Jan Steen

- Artist: Jan Steen
- Year: 1663
- Medium: Oil on canvas
- Dimensions: 102.5 cm × 142.5 cm (40.4 in × 56.1 in)
- Location: National Gallery of Art; Washington, D.C., United States

The Dancing Couple is an oil-on-canvas painting that was created by Jan Steen in 1663. It depicts a boisterous party with a dancing couple in the center. This painting is part of the Widener Collection, which currently resides in the National Gallery of Art in Washington, D.C. The setting of the painting is a kermis, which is a local village fair that several Dutch artworks referenced. Kermises were extremely popular in the Bruegel tradition. The Dancing Couple was one of the few paintings which started a new era in Dutch art. Paintings like these depicts a setting which was inspired by the rural working class of the Dutch people. This was a significant change for Dutch art as these settings highlighted a thriving period in their history. A new perspective was shown which changed the way traditional Dutch art was looked at as they focused more on the realistic rural working lifestyle and values of the Dutch people.

== Description ==
Jan Steen depicts a scene that highlights a wide variety of moods and activities, which altogether create an energetic environment. There are more than a dozen subjects in this horizontal painting, all of whom are enjoying themselves. Most of them are dressed in shades of grey, green, and black. Grayish green and yellow floral vines take up the upper portion of this painting, giving it visual depth. In the background stand two men and a woman on the other side of the fence. Their conversation is unknown as they stay huddled together in secrecy. A woman in a greenish-yellow top and grey skirt sits at the very front of the painting, while her child in a bright orange dress stands and gazes at the entertainment with amusement in her eyes. Behind them sits a woman who drinks her wine, meanwhile a man touches her chin while smiling. She wears a black dress with white ruffles, and he wears a brown shirt with a white drape around his neck. Behind the people eating at the table are two couples talking and laughing together and three men who stand and watch the couple in the middle of the room dancing. The woman wears a salmon pink dress and the man next to her wears shades of brown and black. The man next to him sits beside his wife and son while drinking wine and watching the woman in pink lustfully.

== Historical Context ==
=== Kermis ===
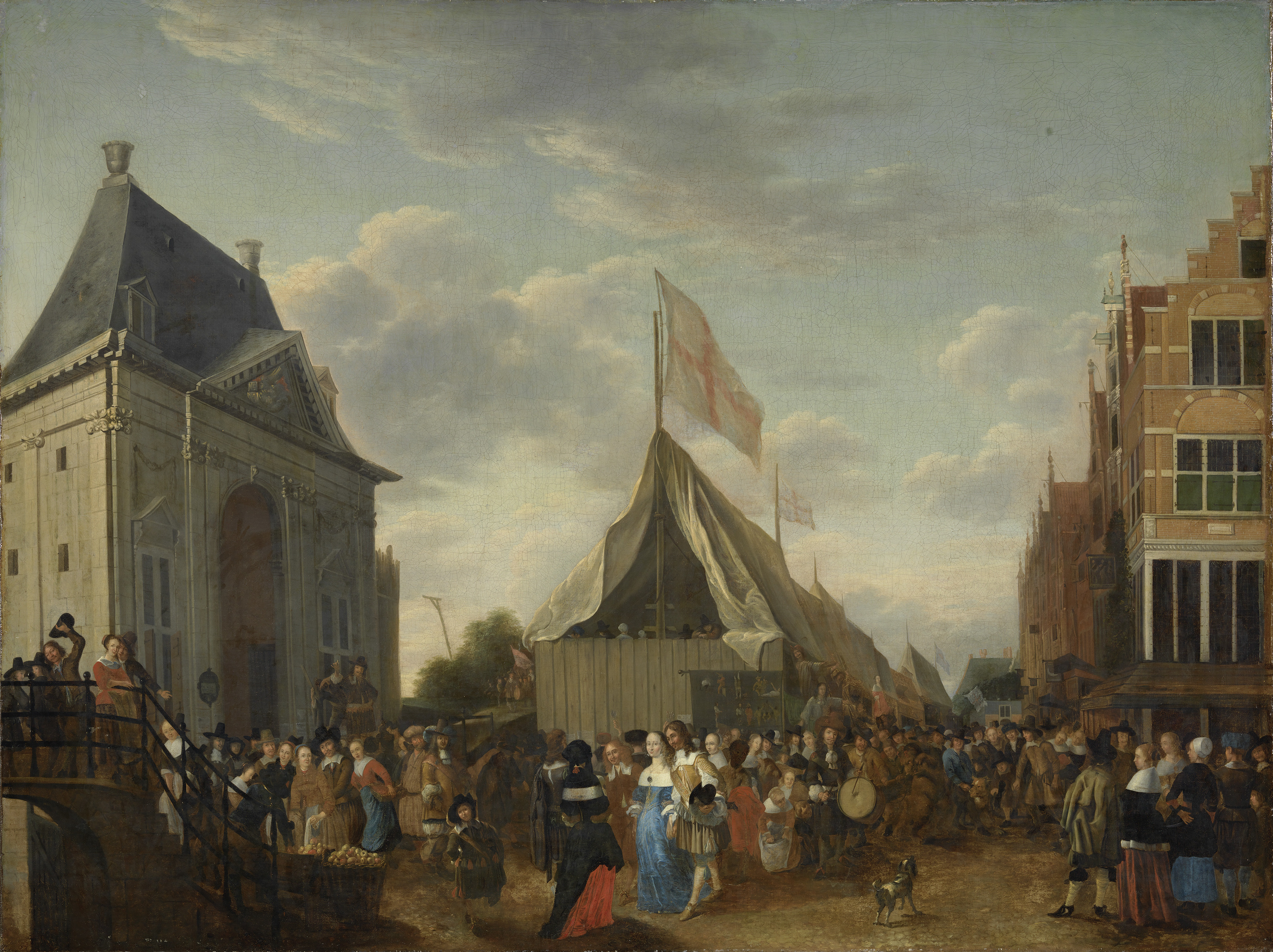
Title / Kermis bij de Heiligewegspoort-The Amsterdam Fair at the Heiligewegspoort; Artist / Gerrit Lundens; Genre / cityscape; Description / schilderij; migratie; stadsgezicht; stadsgezicht Amsterdam; Heiligewegspoort; Koningsplein; kermis; Date / between 1637 and 1683

The kermis is a Dutch fair, an important cultural event and social gathering for the people of the Netherlands. The kermis was commonly depicted in numerous paintings in the seventeenth-century. This festival was a period in which people were given the chance to socialize. This tradition began as a social gathering for farmers during the fourteenth-century at harvest season. With the growth of the rural working class, the kermis grew in popularity and became more commonplace as a setting in artwork. Artists such as Jan Steen often painted kermis fairs and the middle-class lifestyle. Painting a kermis fair allowed artists the opportunity to show emotional expressions in their subjects.

=== Popularity of Peasant Themes in Seventeenth-Century Dutch Art ===
Peasant themes became incredibly popular in seventeenth-century Dutch art and were genre scenes. This style was commonly shown throughout genre paintings of everyday, working-class lifestyles. Numerous artists started painting peasant themes as the Dutch Golden Age, which was a period of relative peace and prosperity. Focusing their paintings on these settings highlighted a thriving period in their history. This was an evolutionary change in traditional Dutch art as artists focused more on the realistic rural lifestyle and value of the Dutch people. It was a popular occurrence for the Dutch people to collect paintings that displayed their values, beliefs, and daily activities such as those depicted in The Dancing Couple. Some of the activities shown in these artworks are cooking, cleaning, talking, family dinners, farm life, and children playing. Peasant themes in Dutch paintings grew in popularity due it being a new perspective on citizens daily lives, as opposed to the depiction of the wealthy and upper-class lifestyles. It brought an aspect of realism and reality to Dutch art. The Dancing Couple is an example of how prevalent the peasant theme was in Dutch art. Peasant themes were important to the everyday people of the Netherlands as this style of art reflected their traditions, cultures, and lifestyles, as shown in The Dancing Couple.

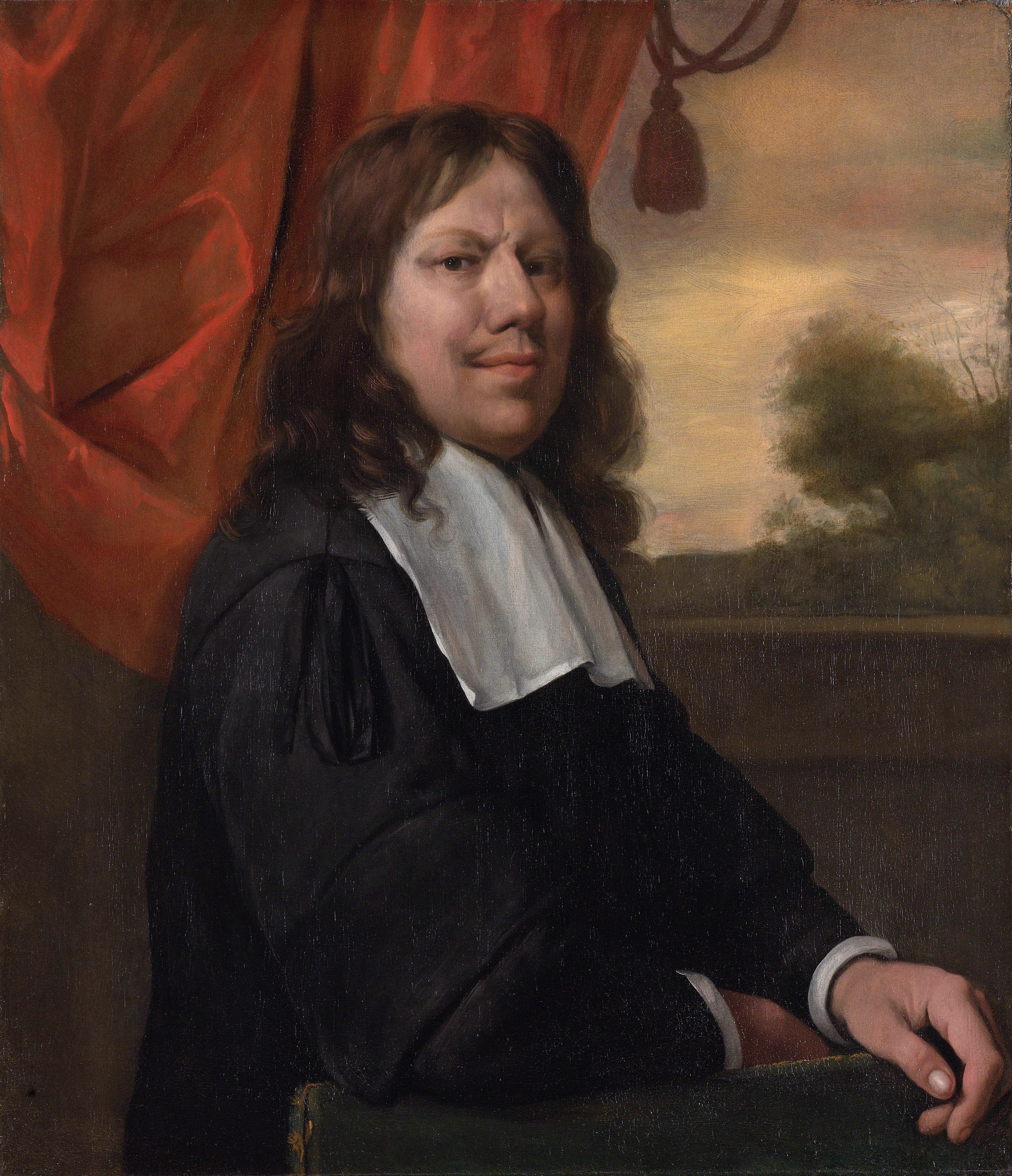
Rijksmuseum: Born / Jan Havickszoon Steenc. 1626 Leiden, Holland, Dutch Republic; Died / buried 3 February 1679 (aged 52–53) Leiden, Holland, Dutch Republic; Nationality / Dutch; Education / Nicolaes Knupfer, Adriaen van Ostade, Jan van Goyen; Known for / Painting; Movement / Dutch Golden Age painting

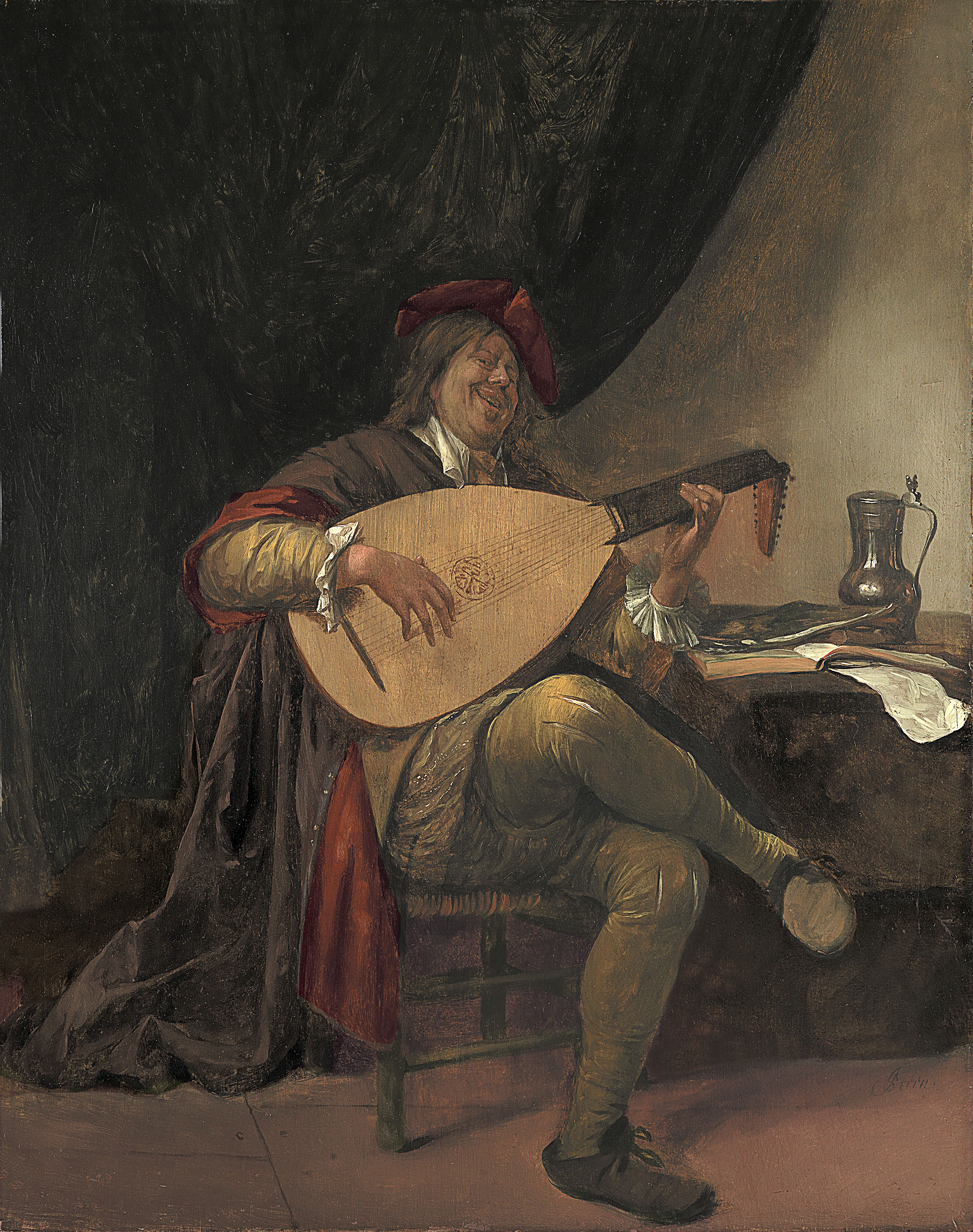
Bornemisza Museum: Born / Jan Havickszoon Steenc. 1626 Leiden, Holland, Dutch Republic; Died / buried 3 February 1679 (aged 52–53) Leiden, Holland, Dutch Republic; Nationality / Dutch; Education / Nicolaes Knupfer, Adriaen van Ostade, Jan van Goyen; Known for / Painting; Movement / Dutch Golden Age painting

=== Jan Steen ===
Jan Steen was a well-renowned artist during the Dutch Golden Age. During this time in the Netherlands, there was a period of great economic and cultural growth. When The Dancing Couple was created, Jan Steen had already been well known within the painting community. At the age of 37, his reputation grew due to his affinity to genre scenes such as The Dancing Couple.

== Iconography ==
Seventeenth-century Dutch artworks such as The Dancing Couple by Jan Steen are known for the iconography they present that reflect the political, social, and cultural qualities of the Dutch people. The Dancing Couple is one of many seventeenth-century Dutch Art pieces which reflected the lifestyle of everyday people. Paintings such as The Dancing Couple often contained symbols that convey a moral message to the viewer. Examples of these symbols are flowers, birds, and other animals which usually represent moral and religious beliefs. In The Dancing Couple, an example is the fallen bucket of flowers at the bottom of the painting. In this image, the flowers have fallen out, usually representing an absence of morals or loss of innocence. An example of this message is shown through the consumption of alcohol and the flirtation that is seen on the left side of the painting. Other symbols such as the birds and animals are shown in the form of chickens trapped in wooden cages on the top of someone's head and hanging from the ceiling.

== The Five Senses ==
Jan Steen is commonly known for presenting all five human senses: sound, sight, touch, taste, and smell. His artworks offer a wide variety of moods. This was not an easy feature to depict in artwork as it required the artist to focus on the smaller details of their subjects. In The Dancing Couple, Steen depicts the five senses to give his subjects a more humane depiction. Steen shows a common reoccurrence throughout the majority of his paintings where he gives his subjects a “clarity of humanity” within their facial expressions and movement. Jan Steen adds more context and detail to his artwork by focusing on the five senses of humanity. Embodying this technique helps the viewer to get a better understanding of the image. This technique brings life and characteristics to Steen's paintings. This technique also helped with showing a sense of humanity which differs from other paintings during this period.

=== Sight ===
Sight is shown throughout the painting. The people's facial expressions show they are having fun. The child in the orange dress is filled with amusement while looking at the couple. Sight is embodied as everyone is shown to be dancing and having an enjoyable time with each other.

=== Sound ===
Sound is an interesting sense to show in a painting as it is less straightforward. Unlike sight, sound requires the viewer to use the context of the painting. Sound is embodied as there is music being played with flutes and a violin. The footsteps of the people dancing and tapping along while music is played.

=== Touch ===
The element of touch is shown through the clothing material of the people. Many of the women are painted wearing a cotton and silky material. Touch is also shown in the wood of the instruments and the chairs. Touch is embodied as people come together and told the hand of their friends and neighbors while dancing. Women are holding wine glasses and children, while men hold their wine glasses and cigars.

=== Taste ===
Taste is another element that requires the other senses to understand the context of the image. There is food that surrounds every corner of the table. The wine that the people drink to pair their food with. Taste is primarily embodied with the food on the table.

=== Smell ===
The Dancing Couple shows people drinking wine. They are in an outdoor environment where flowers are shown scattered on the ground, vines weave in between the wooden panels, and fresh food is served on the table. Tobacco is also being smoked in the open environment.
