= As the Old Sing, So Pipe the Young (Jan Steen) =

c. 1668–1670 oil on canvas painting by Jan Steen

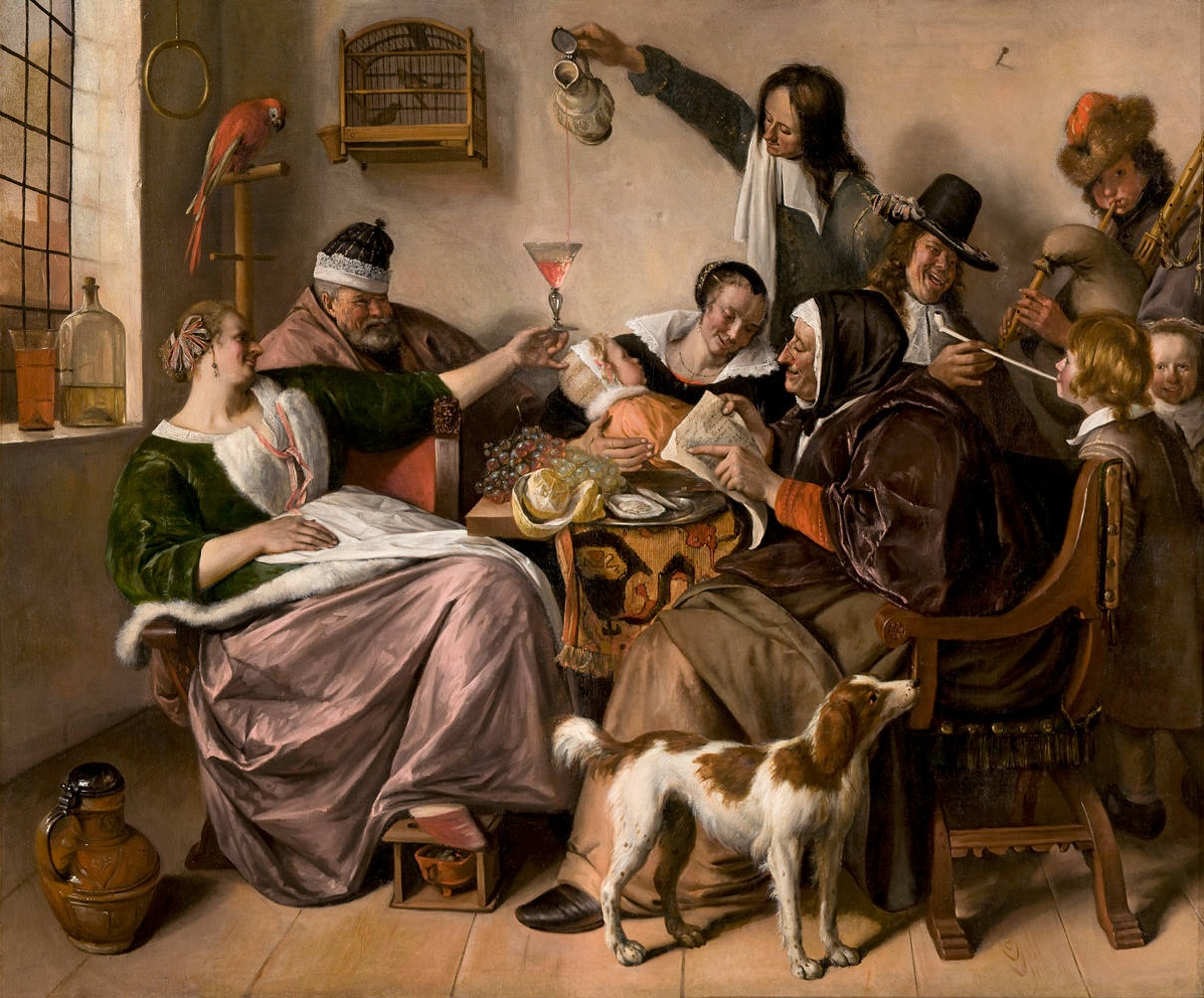
"As the Old Sing, So Pipe the Young" (c. 1668–1670) by Jan Steen

"As the Old Sing, So Pipe the Young", in Dutch, Soo voer gesongen, soo na gepepen, is an oil-on-canvas painting executed c. 1668–1670 by Dutch artist Jan Steen. It is in the collection of the Mauritshuis in The Hague. The painting is a celebratory holiday scene that depicts three generations of a Dutch family and serves as an allegory about parental examples, vice, and influence. This subject was painted thirteen times by Jan Steen and has also been known as The Cat Family, or Jan Steen's Family. Of the many renditions, the Mauritshuis version is considered to be the exemplar of the series. Its dimensions are 133.7 cm × 162.5 cm.

== Subject matter ==
Schelte Adamsz. Bolswert after Jacob Jordaens, As the Old Sing, So Pipe the Young, 1638-59, the popular print of Jordaen's version with titles in Latin and Dutch

As the Old Sing so Pipe the Young is named after a famous proverb from Jacob Cats. It means that the vices of the youth are learned from the examples set by their elders. Steen references this throughout the painting. The proverb itself can be read in Dutch from the paper in the grandmother's hand "Liet / Soo voer gesongen soo / na gepepen dat is al lang / g[e]bleken ick sing u vo[or] / so[o] volcht ons na[er] / van een tot hon[derd] / jaar". The parrot shows wealth and exoticism, but it could also reference the mimicry in the title. He uses the imagery of the pipes in the bagpipe player and in the man to the right of the painting who, laughing, allows his son to smoke from his pipe. Inherited traits were viewed by Cats at the time as being a two-sided coin, in that a child would inherit genetic traits from their parents, but would also learn to emulate the behaviors that they witnessed. The depiction of three generations of family members in this scene is a direct allusion to this idea, with the parents providing seemingly poor examples to their children by drinking alcoholic beverages and encouraging the children to smoke. The title can also be interpreted as "Like father, like son". Such proverbs were popular in Dutch painting and are represented by many paintings by Steen and other artists, though Jordaens is often mentioned as having made the first one (possibly due to the print).

== Description ==
As a genre scene painting, the painting contains many iconographic elements that are open to the viewer's interpretation and ideas that relate to Dutch popular culture of the time. The painting consists of a gathering of family members (parents, children, grandparents) around a table that is draped with a carpet typical of Dutch scenes. Though the subject has been painted by Steen an estimated thirteen times, each one was depicted in a household setting as the theme for child rearing and parental interaction. Like most of Steen's paintings As the Old Sing... is of the merry company genre and depicts family life as a part of popular culture during the 17th century. Typically, paintings of this period are festive scenes in Dutch domestic settings. The large canvas displays Steen's mastery of painting light on surfaces, as can be seen in the treatment of light from the window reflected onto the surfaces of the models' clothing and furniture accents. The facial features of the subjects are painted in a realistic style with attention to light and shadow. The overall scene of the merry atmosphere is thought to be open and inviting with the figures situated in an open arrangement, with warm colors of orange, pink, purple, and brown; while casually enjoying themselves. The old lady in the foreground, thought to be Steen's mother, is holding a sheet of music that is open and can be easily read by the viewer. Steen is distinguished as a skilled comic painter and for depicting himself in his paintings, as well as members of his own family. Here he has depicted himself as the father seen in the right side of the canvas who is teaching his younger son to smoke a pipe. Such a painting was thought by the artist to have universal appeal and understanding, but of course, it would have had more resonance with a well-read person familiar with the proverbs, symbolism, and culture of the seventeenth century. Ironically, Steen's knowledge of such readings and traditions is considered to be rather sophisticated.

=== Symbolism ===
The figures in the scene are Jan Steen at the right wearing a black hat and teaching his younger son to smoke, his older son playing a bagpipe, a young girl at the far right edge of the canvas, Steen's mother in the right-side foreground, and an unknown female family member holding a baby. There is also a male servant at the rear center who is pouring an alcoholic drink into the glass of Steen's wife, who is pictured at the left of the canvas wearing a green coat and lavender skirt with her glass outstretched. There is a dog in the foreground. At the center of the table is an oyster which has been a popular symbol in Dutch genre painting. The oyster has been known as a symbol of Aphrodite, love, fertility, and sexual pleasure. The symbol is befitting of such as scene as it is associated with foods served at a feast of the gods. The oyster was commonly depicted in Dutch genre paintings up until the year 1635 when it became less common. After the year 1660 the symbol again became a common theme as it is here in Steen's 1668–1670 painting. In the painting the woman in the lavender skirt sitting at the left is a depiction of Steen's wife. She and Steen both wear a pink ribbon, she in her hair, and he on his hat. This ribbon is a unifying element between the two and represents their being cut from the same spool of ribbon. The parrot situated at the top left of the painting is a symbol of mimicry. To the left of the parrot is a pair of birds in a small birdcage which symbolizes two parents in a small abode. The pipe in the scene may have multiple meanings referring to a clay smoking pipe, the act of singing, or to a drinking vessel. According to the Dutch, the bagpipe was not an esteemed instrument as it was thought to be lowly and obnoxious. Such a symbol here represents bawdiness and low class, which is being encouraged by the parents. The young man playing the bagpipe is an older son of Steen. The laughing face of Jan Steen is commonly depicted by the artist in his paintings and is considered to be his iconography while laughter is also thought to be a symbol of foolishness and or fault. A reader might interpret the many laughing faces as gained wisdom, human fault, or lessons learned. Steen's iconographic grin has become somewhat of a folk character to museum patrons who delight in seeing his face in paintings.

== Culture ==
Jan Steen has been described by historians as being from a middle-class, Catholic family of Leiden, who was also preoccupied with drinking and imprudent of his finances. Historical accounts state that Steen's father owned a brewery but also suggest that the brewery business became less profitable due to economic demands and competition. As a result, Steen was encouraged by his parents to pursue a career in painting, which was a respected profession of the time. From his experience as a painter Steen endured constant fluctuations of financial difficulty. As a painter he often depicted himself within his comical scenes to show himself immersed in the culture he depicted and is also as an allusion to the idea that art imitates life. Steen was a resident of The Hague where he married Margariet or Grietje, and also became a member of The Hague Guild. As a member of the guild Steen is thought to have pursued comic painting as the path to a chosen specialization.

== Provenance ==
Jan Steen is considered to have been a fixture in Leiden, with most of his commissions coming from familial connections and recommendations. Though the provenance for this painting does not reach back farther than the beginning of the 19th-century in Warmond, its attribution has never been questioned. It was first catalogued by John Smith and in 1908 by his follower Cornelis Hofstede de Groot, who wrote:

"529. A MERRY COMPANY. Sm. 106; W. 35.— To the left is a young woman wearing a green bodice and a red skirt; she holds in her left hand a glass which a young man fills for her. In the centre an old woman reads a letter. On the right the artist is teaching a boy to smoke. Near him is a woman with a child in her lap. Farther back are a bagpiper and an old man. The persons are seated at a table. It is spirited in expression, and the brushwork is broad and flowing; the execution is somewhat superficial, but it is one of the artist's best works and resembles the picture formerly in the Van der Hoop collection (523).

Signed in full on the wall to the left; canvas, 52 inches by 64 inches. Sale. — Baroness Van Leyden, nee Countess Thoms, Warmond, July 16, 1816, No. 35 (1260 florins).

Now in the Steengracht collection, The Hague (where it was seen in 1833 by Sm.)."

The painting entered the collection in 1913 after it was sold from the Steengracht collection in 1912.
