= Sturla Gudlaugsson =

Dutch art historian (1913–1971)

- Born: 16 June 1913; Skagen
- Died: 13 March 1971 (aged 57); Rotterdam

Sturla Gudlaugsson (1913–1971) was a Danish-born Dutch art historian and director of the RKD and the Mauritshuis in The Hague.

Gudlaugsson was born in Skagen as the son of the Icelandic poet Jonas Gudlaugsson, but his father died when he was three and he grew up in Kleef with his mother's extended Dutch family. He studied in Berlin and worked first there until he felt he needed to leave the Nazi regime and got a job in Denmark. He then worked briefly at the Gemeentelijk museum in The Hague before starting work at the RKD in 1942.

He is best known for his research on Dutch painting iconography, most notably in the works of Jan Steen and Gerard ter Borch. He was one of the founding editors of the journal Netherlands Yearbook for History of Art, on the board of which he served from 1947 to 1953.

Gudlaugsson left the RKD to become director of the Mauritshuis in 1970, but he died the next year in Rotterdam.
