= The Old Folks Sing, the Young Folks Chirp (Jordaens, Valenciennes) =

Painting by Jacob Jordaens

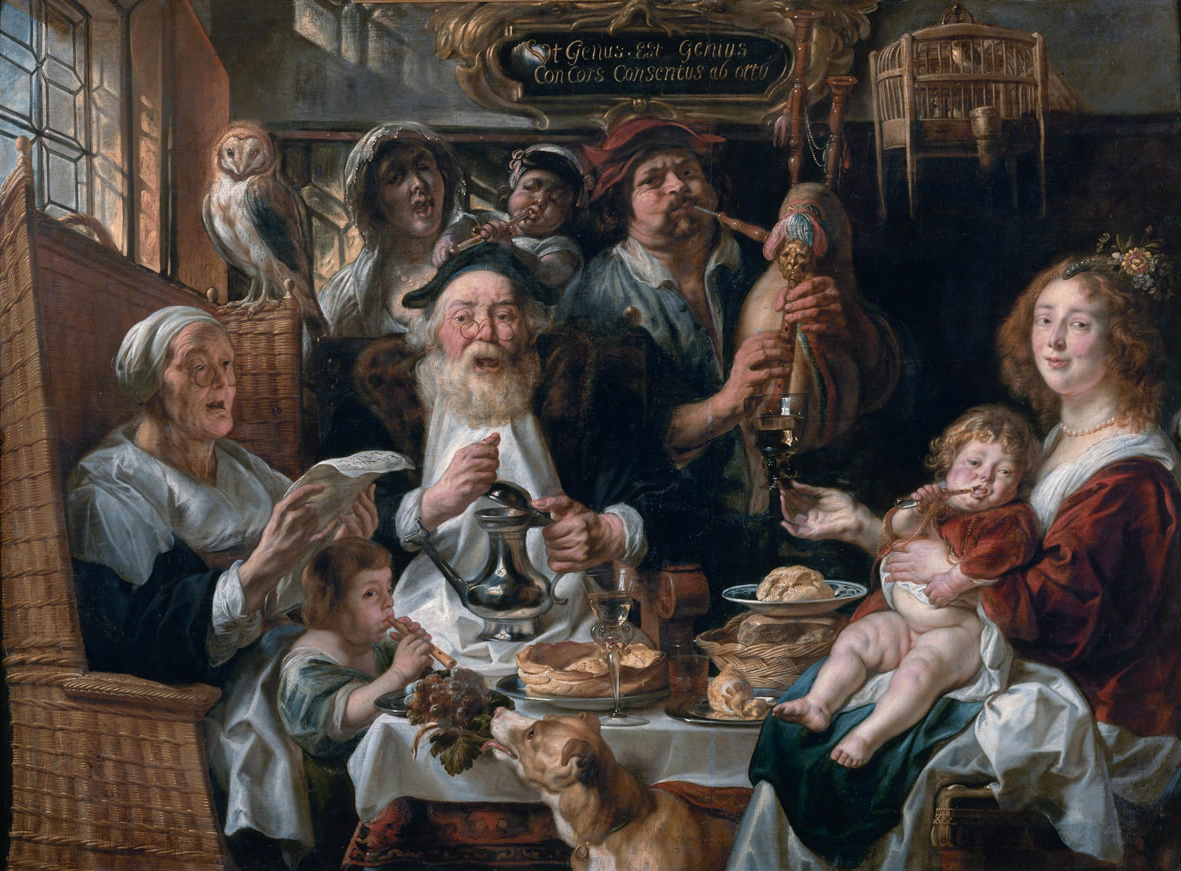
- Artist: Jacob Jordaens
- Year: 1638 - 1640
- Medium: Oil on canvas
- Movement: Flemish Baroque
- Location: Musée des Beaux-Arts de Valenciennes; Valenciennes

The Old Folks Sing, the Young Folks Chirp, also known as m As the Old Sang, So the Young Pipe , is a 1638–1640 oil painting by the Flemish artist Jacob Jordaens, now in the musée des beaux-arts de Valenciennes. It shows three children playing the flute for a drinking party attended by three toothless old men.
