= Jan Steen =

Dutch genre painter (c.1626–1679)

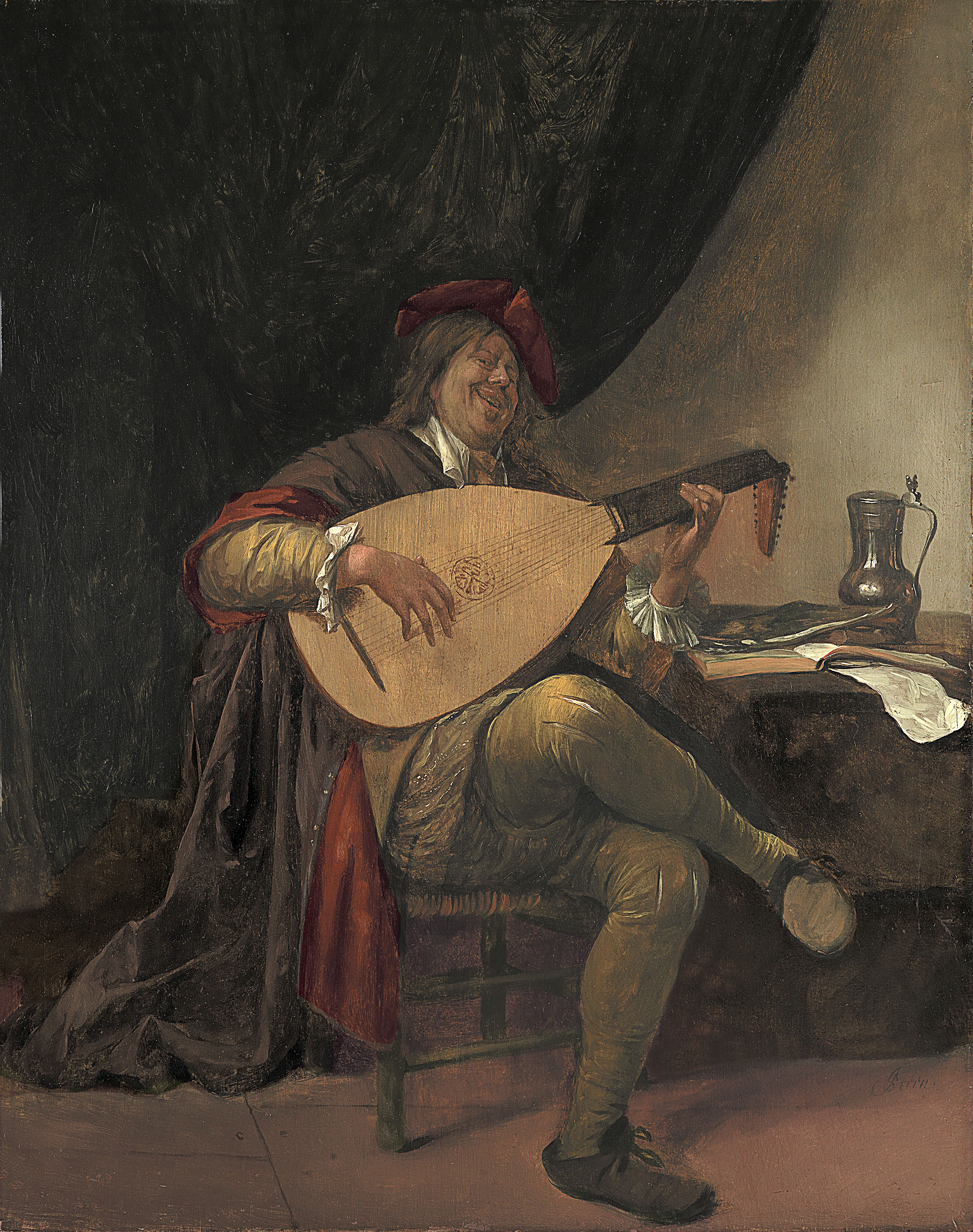
- Self portrait (c. 1663–1665) in the Thyssen-Bornemisza Museum
- Born: Jan Havickszoon Steen c. 1626; Leiden, Holland, Dutch Republic
- Died: buried 3 February 1679 (aged 52–53); Leiden, Holland, Dutch Republic
- Education: Nicolaes Knupfer, Adriaen van Ostade, Jan van Goyen
- Known for: Painting
- Movement: Dutch Golden Age

Jan Havickszoon Steen (Dutch: [jɑn steːn]; c. 1626 – buried 3 February 1679) was a Dutch Golden Age painter, one of the leading genre painters of the 17th century. His works are known for their psychological insight, sense of humour and abundance of colour. Their satire also mocks the behavior and attitudes of the Dutch bourgeoisie.

== Life ==
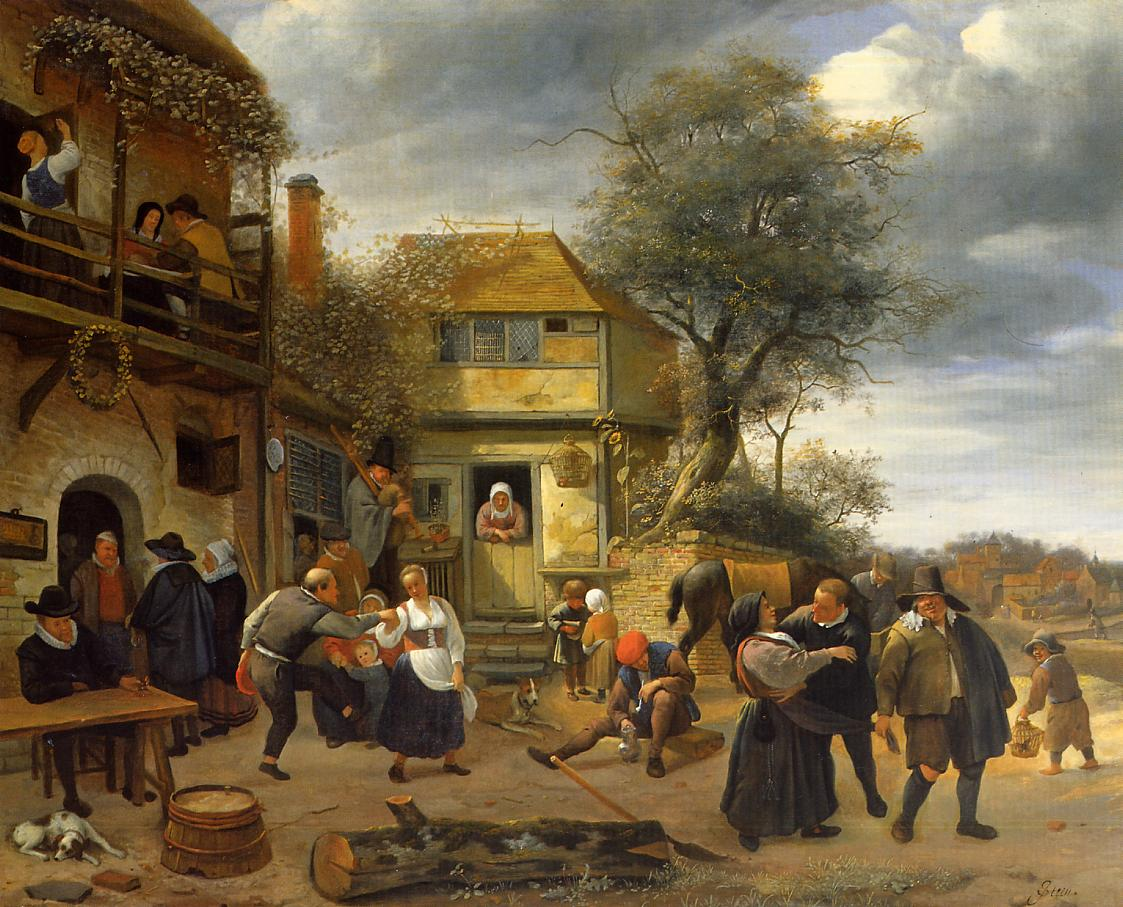
Jan Steen Peasants before an Inn

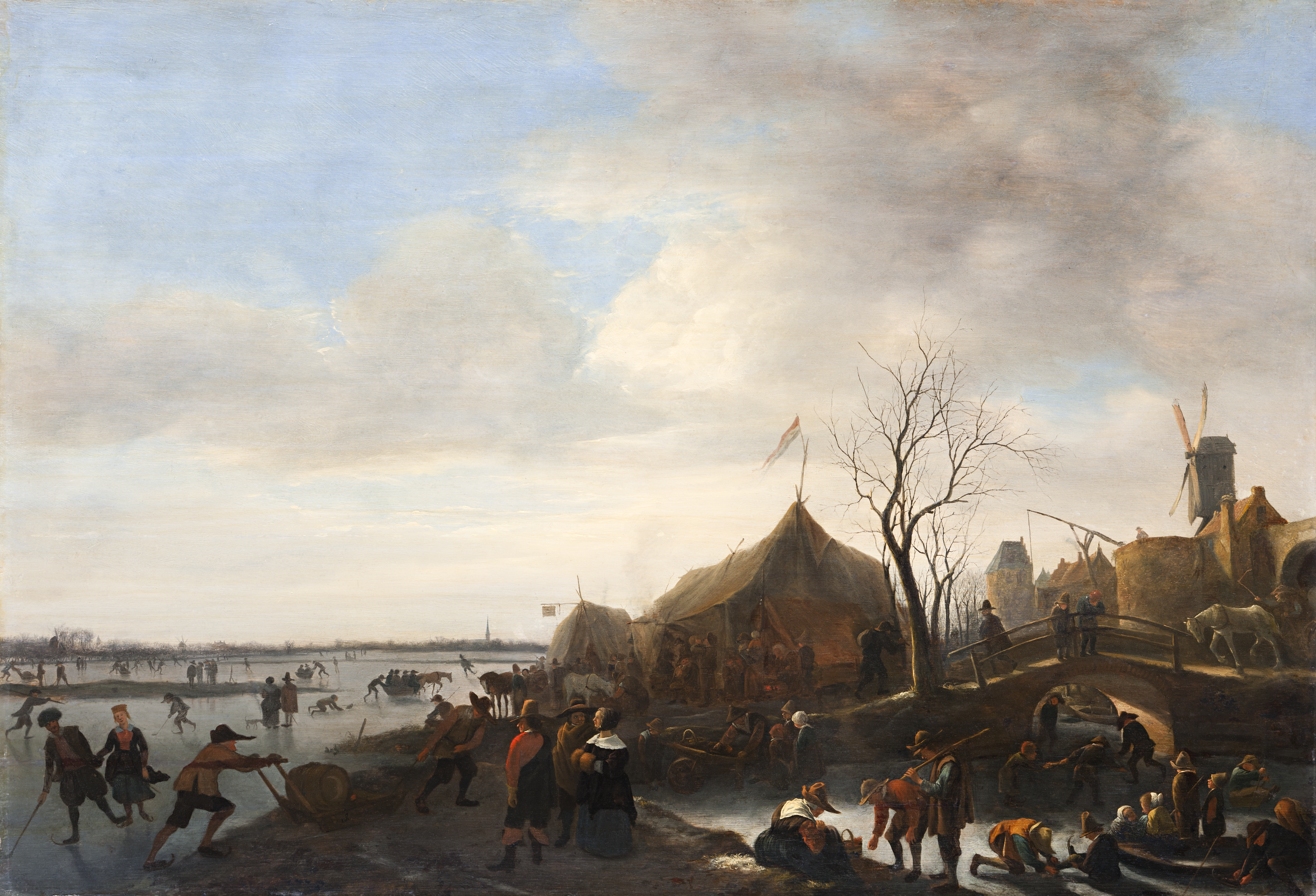
Winter scene, 1650

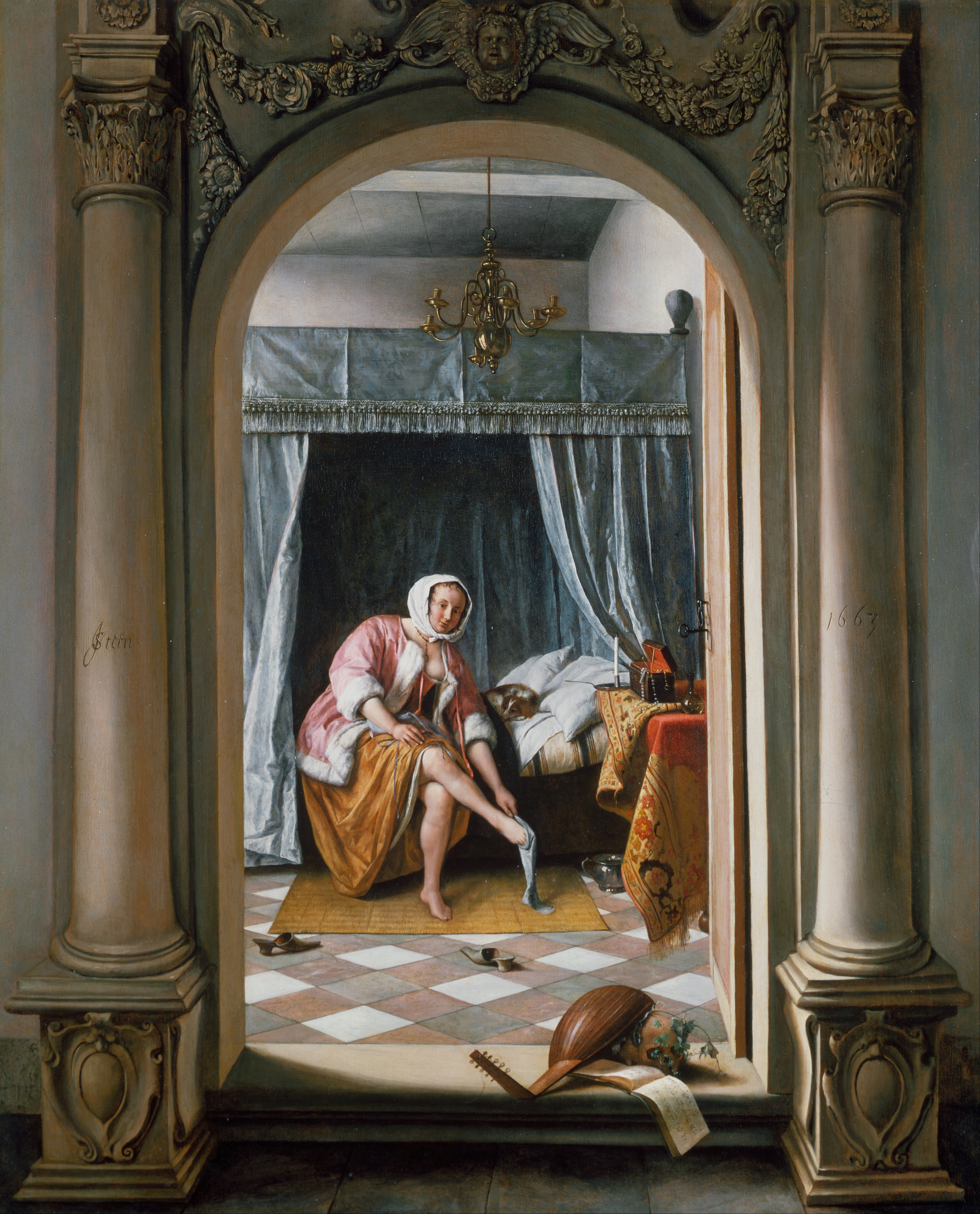
Woman at her Toilet, 1663

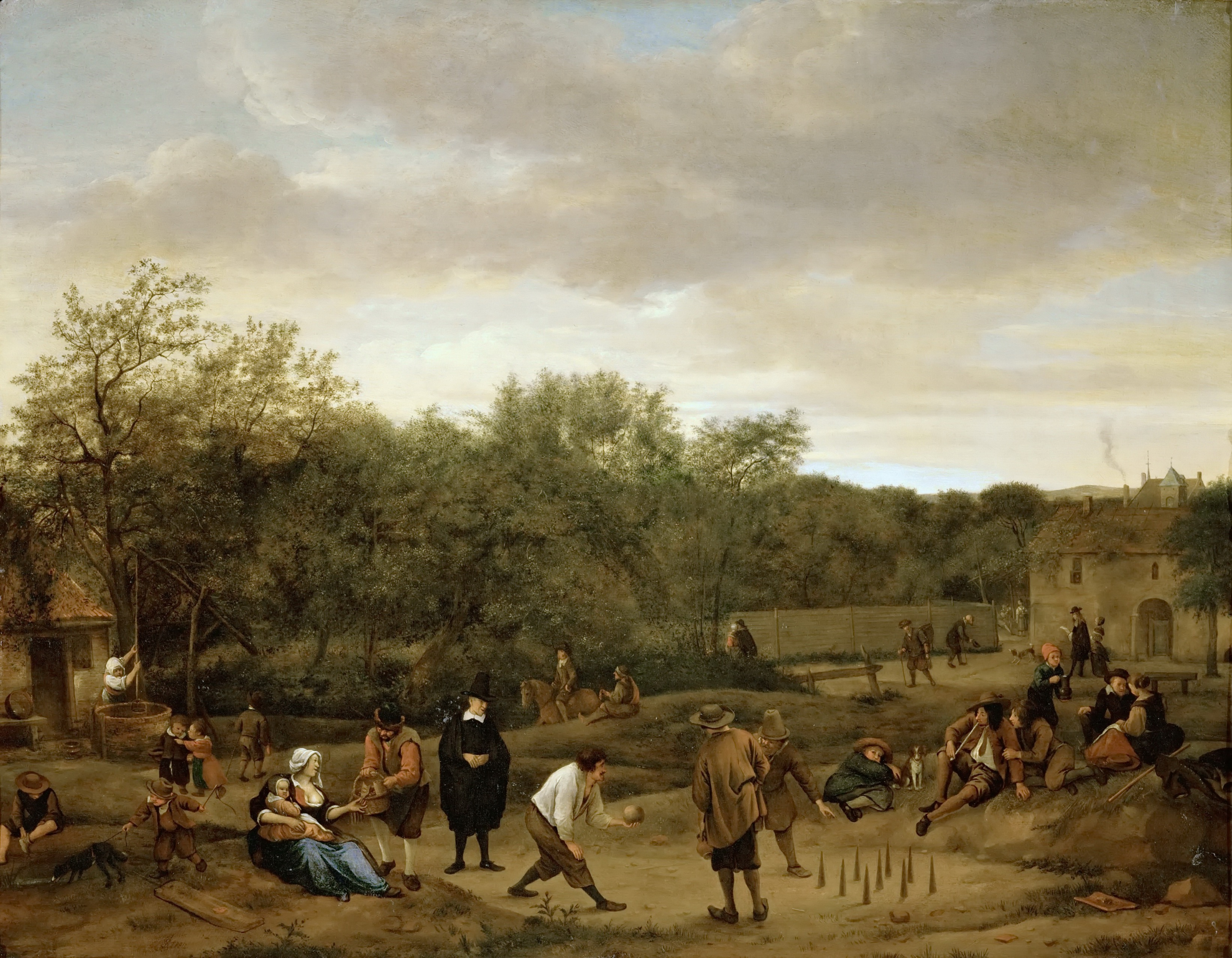
The Bowling Game, c. 1655

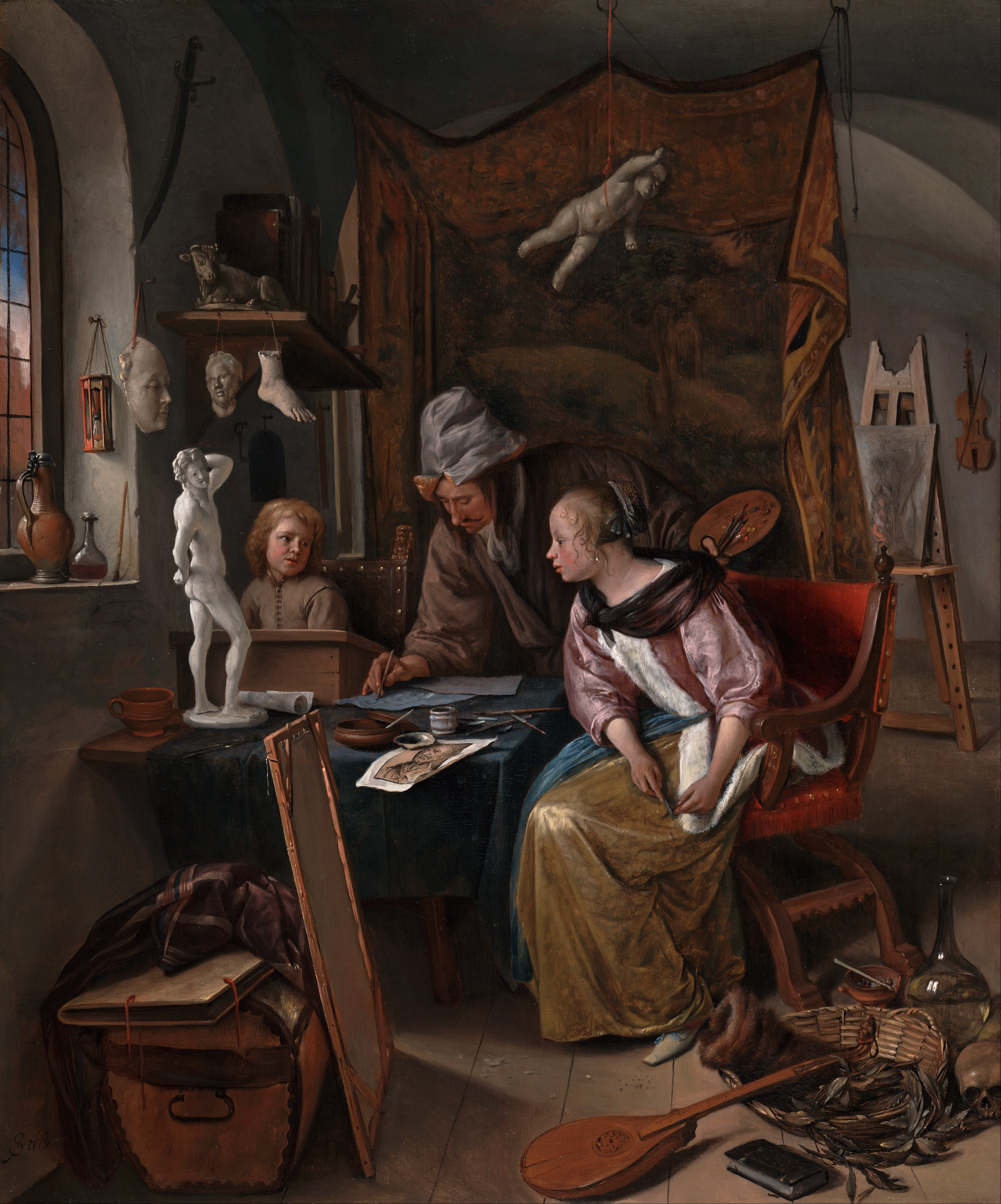
The Drawing Lesson, 1665, J. Paul Getty Museum, Los Angeles

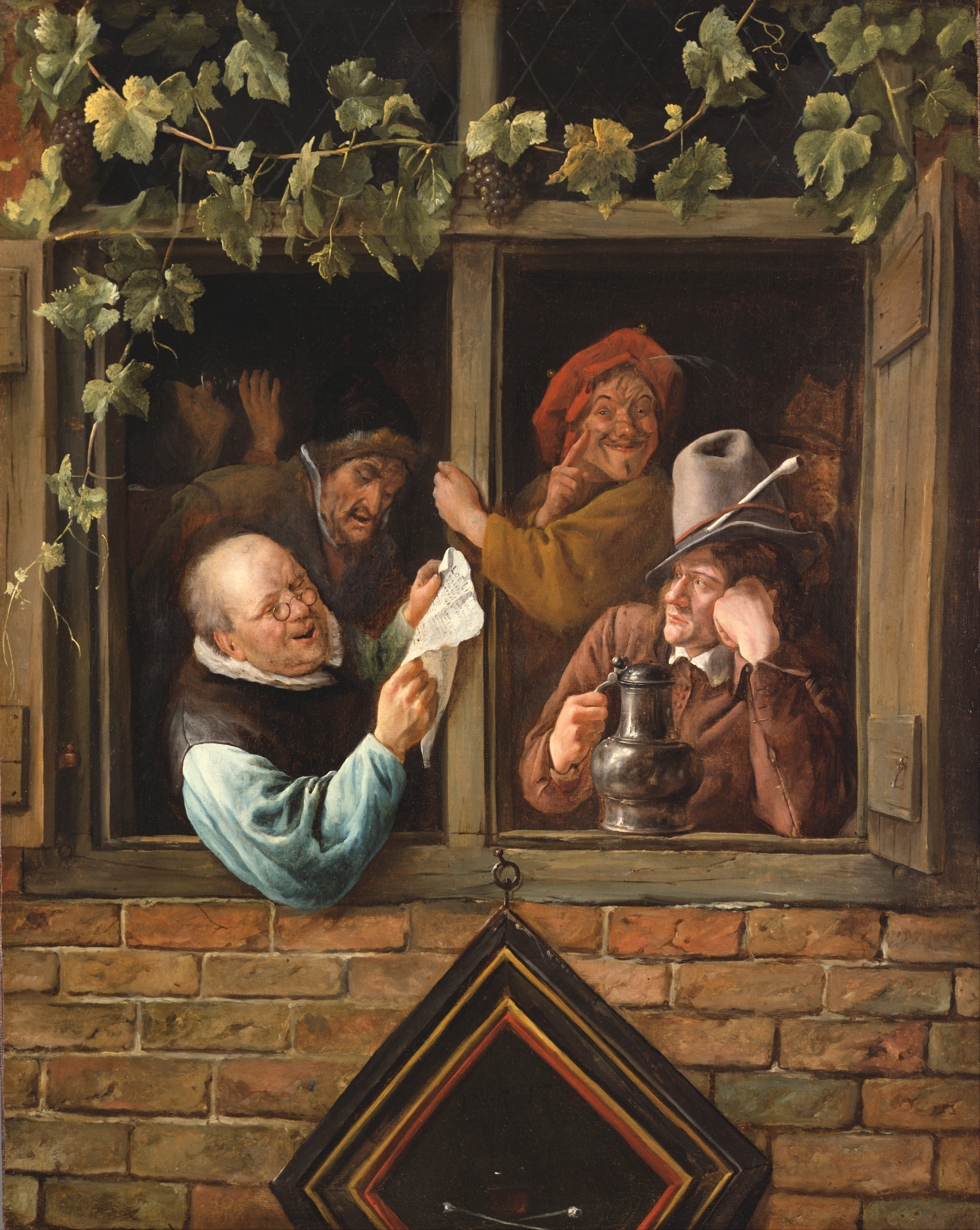
Rhetoricians at a Window

Steen was born in Leiden, a town in Southern Holland, where his well-to-do, Catholic family were brewers who ran the tavern The Red Halbert for two generations. Steen's father even leased him a brewery of his own in Delft from the years 1654 until 1657. He was the eldest of eight or more children. Like his even more famous contemporary Rembrandt van Rijn, Jan Steen attended the Latin school and became a student in Leiden. Though no official records of Steen's artistic training are preserved, contemporary sources tell us he received his painterly education from three men, Nicolaes Knupfer (1603–1660), a German painter of historical and figurative scenes in Utrecht, Adriaen van Ostade, and Jan van Goyen, who would later become his father-in-law. Influences of Knupfer can be found in Steen's use of composition and colour. Another source of inspiration was Isaac van Ostade, a painter of rural scenes, who lived in Haarlem.

In 1648 Jan Steen and Gabriël Metsu founded the painters' Guild of Saint Luke at Leiden. Soon after he became an assistant to the renowned landscape painter Jan van Goyen (1596–1656), and moved into his house on the Bierkade in The Hague. On 3 October 1649, he married van Goyen's daughter Margriet, with whom he would have eight children. Steen worked with his father-in-law until 1654, when he moved to Delft, where he ran the brewery De Slang ("The Snake") for three years without much success. After the explosion in Delft in 1654 the art market was depressed, but Steen painted A Burgomaster of Delft and his daughter. It does not seem to be clear if this painting should be called a portrait or a genre work.

Steen lived in Warmond, just north of Leiden, from 1656 until 1660 and in Haarlem from 1660 until 1670 and in both periods he was especially productive. In 1670, after the death of his wife in 1669 and his father in 1670, Steen moved back to Leiden, where he stayed the rest of his life. When the art market collapsed in 1672, called the Year of Disaster, Steen opened a tavern. In April 1673 he married Maria van Egmont, who gave him another child. In 1674 he became president of the Saint Luke's Guild. Frans van Mieris (1635–1681) became one of his drinking companions. He died in Leiden in 1679 and was interred in a family grave in the Pieterskerk.

== Influences ==
=== Connection with the Rederijkers ===
In 1945, Sturla Gudlaugsson, a specialist in Dutch seventeenth-century painting and iconography and Director of the Netherlands Institute for Art History and the Mauritshuis in The Hague, wrote The Comedians in the work of Jan Steen and his Contemporaries, which revealed that a major influence on Jan Steen's work was the guild of the Rhetoricians or Rederijkers and their theatrical endeavors.

It is often suggested that Jan Steen's paintings are a realistic portrayal of Dutch 17th-century life. However, not everything he did was a purely realistic representation of his day-to-day environment. Many of his scenes contain idyllic and bucolic fantasies and a declamatory emphasis redolent of theater.

Jan Steen's connection to theater is easily verifiable through his connection to the Rederijkers. There are two kinds of evidence for this connection. First, Jan Steen's uncle belonged to the Rhetoricians in Leiden, where Steen was born and lived a substantial part of his life. Second, Jan Steen portrayed many scenes from the lives of the Rederijkers, an example being the painting Rhetoricians at a Window of 1658–1665. The piece is currently held in the Philadelphia Museum of Art which was established in February 1876. The humanity, humour and optimism of the figures suggest that Jan Steen knew these men well, and wanted to portray them positively.

=== Theater ===
With his lavish and moralising style, it is logical that Steen would employ the stratagems from theater for his purposes. There is conclusive evidence that the characters in Steen's paintings are predominantly theatrical characters and not ones from reality.

Steen's numerous paintings of a theme most commonly entitled The Doctor's Visit, such as the composition of 1665–1670 in the Rijksmuseum, illustrate his theatrical approach. The story is simple: a doctor attending a young maiden discovers that she is not ill but is in fact pregnant with child. The doctor is a comical character who wears a biretta, a doublet and a small pleated ruff. In fact, he is dressed in the fashion of 1570, not 1670. In contrast, the girl wears what would be the height of fashion at the time of the painting, a Japanese-styled loose kimono robe.

This anachronism can be explained only one way: this is not a real doctor but an actor wearing a traditional theater costume. According to Gudlaugsson, "never would so unusual and so completely uncontemporary a costume occur as that of the doctors in [Steen's] work".

== Works ==
Daily life was Jan Steen's main pictorial theme. Many of the genre scenes he portrayed, as in The Feast of Saint Nicholas, are lively to the point of chaos and lustfulness, even so much that "a Jan Steen household", meaning a messy scene, became a Dutch proverb (een huishouden van Jan Steen). Subtle hints in his paintings seem to suggest that Steen meant to warn the viewer rather than invite him to copy this behaviour. Many of Steen's paintings bear references to old Dutch proverbs or literature. He often used members of his family as models, and painted quite a few self-portraits in which he showed no tendency to vanity. Jan Steen’s works followed the theme "every painter paints himself", depicting lively scenes reminiscent of his own home.

Steen did not shy from other themes: he painted historical, mythological and religious scenes, portraits, still lifes and natural scenes. His portraits of children are famous. He is also well known for his mastery of light and attention to detail, most notably in Persian rugs and other textiles.

Steen was prolific, producing about 800 paintings, of which roughly 350 survive. His work was valued much by contemporaries and as a result he was reasonably well paid for his work. He did not have many students—only Richard Brakenburgh is recorded—but his work proved a source of inspiration for many painters.

In the two paintings, The way you hear it and As old men sing, so children squeal, six of the people are identical in person and pose, and their spatial relationship is similar.

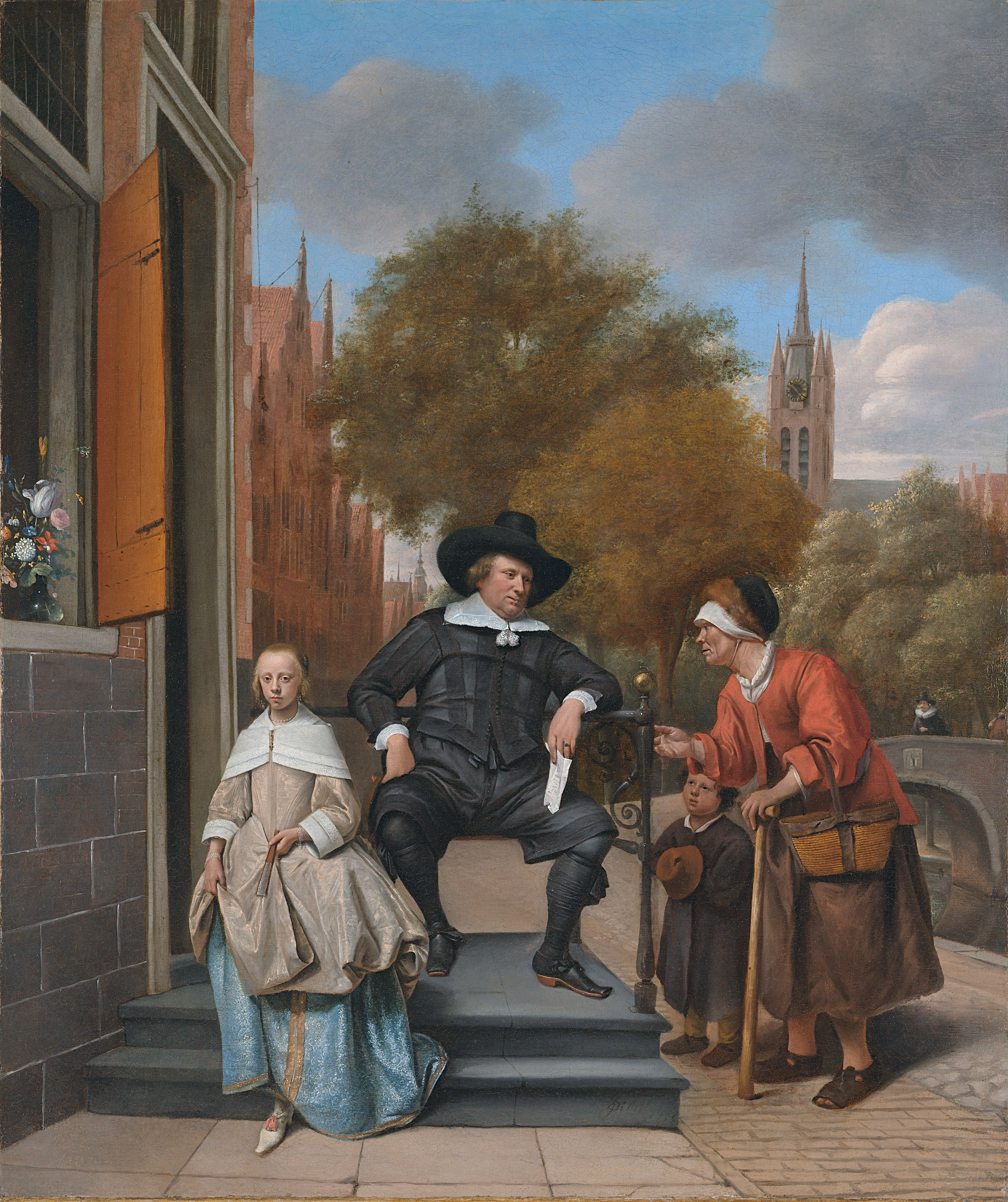
A Burgomaster of Delft and his daughter, 1654, Rijksmuseum

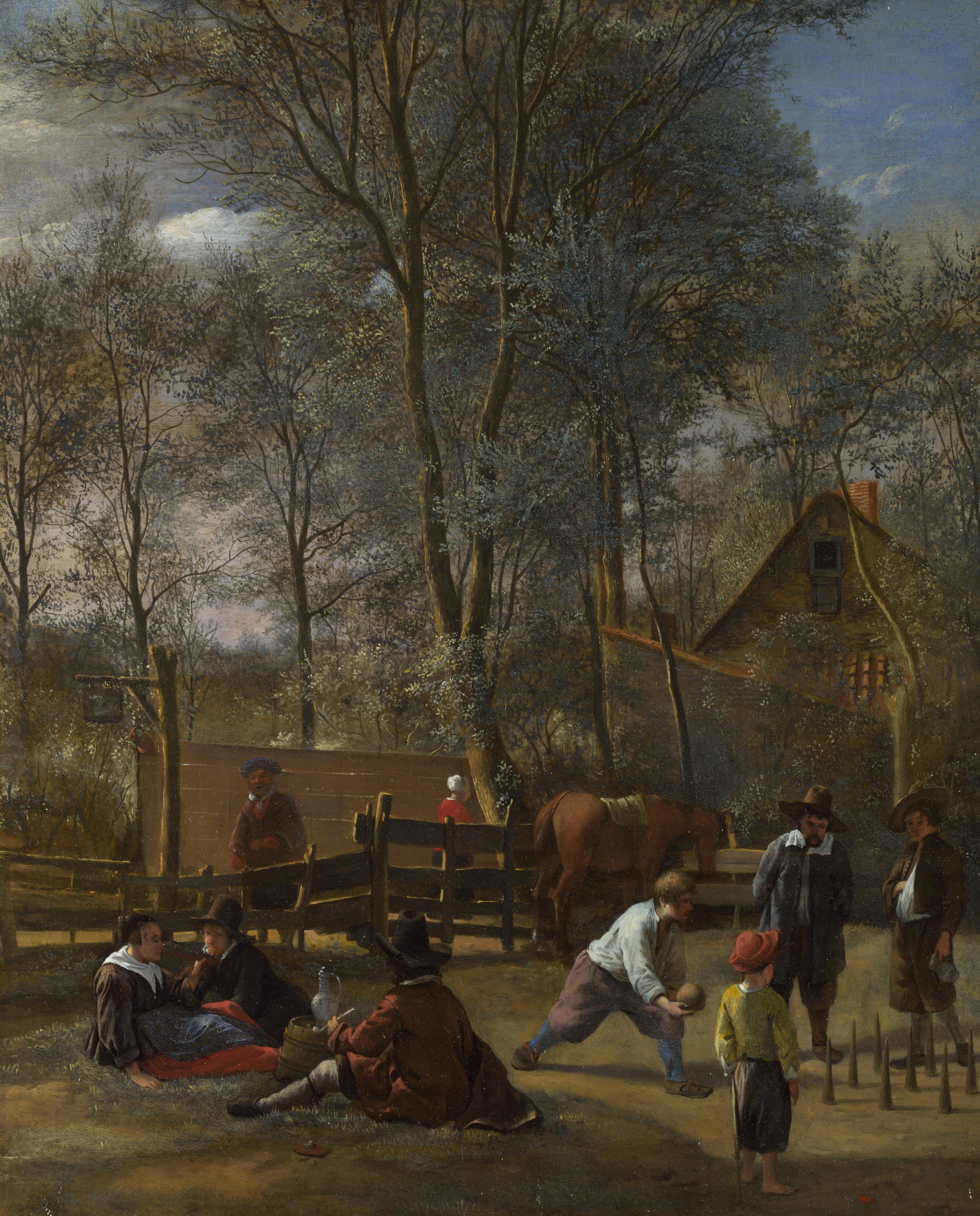
Skittles Players Outside an Inn, 1660, National Gallery

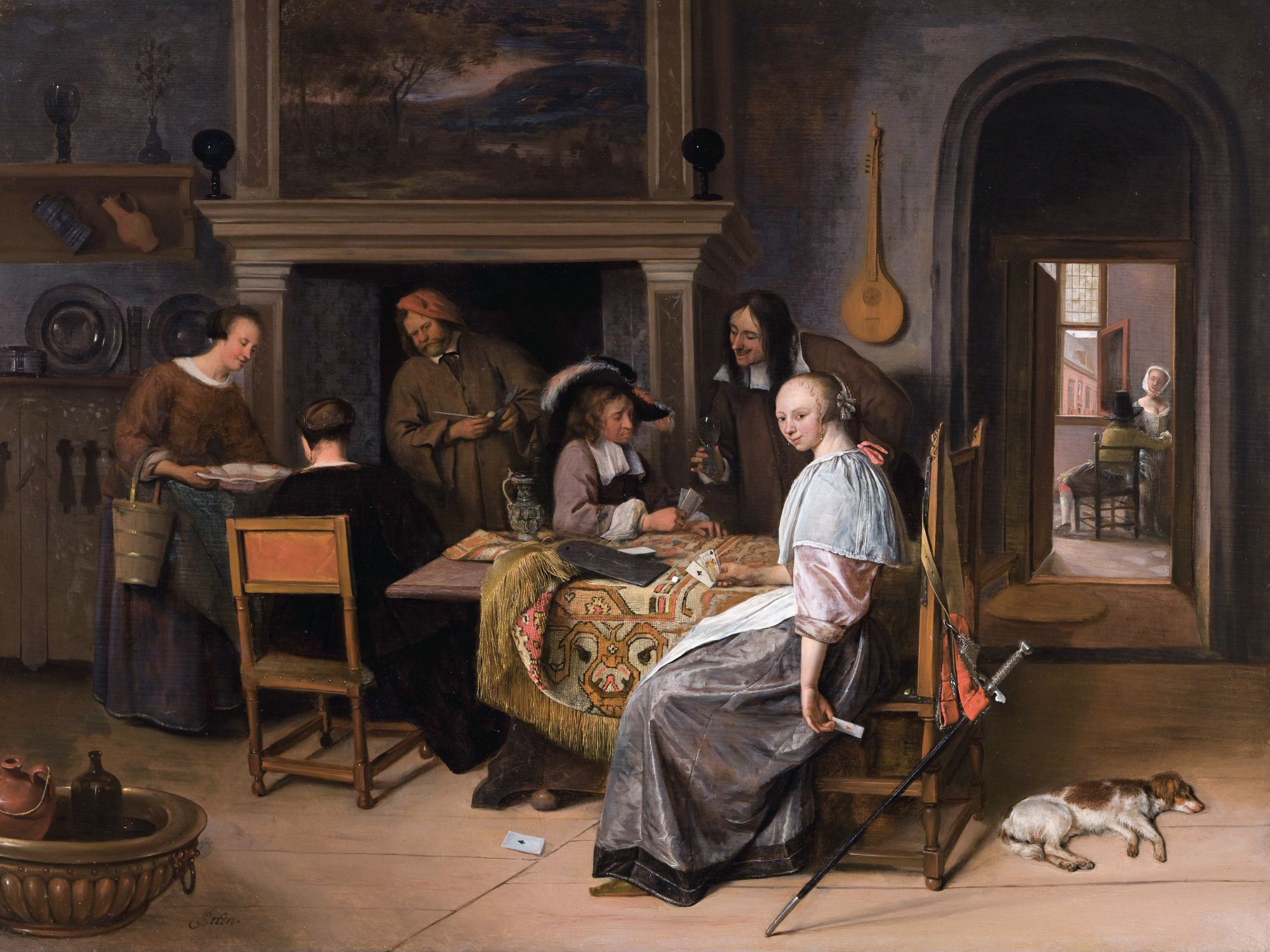
The Card Players in an Interior, c. 1660, Rose-Marie and Eijk van Otterloo Collection

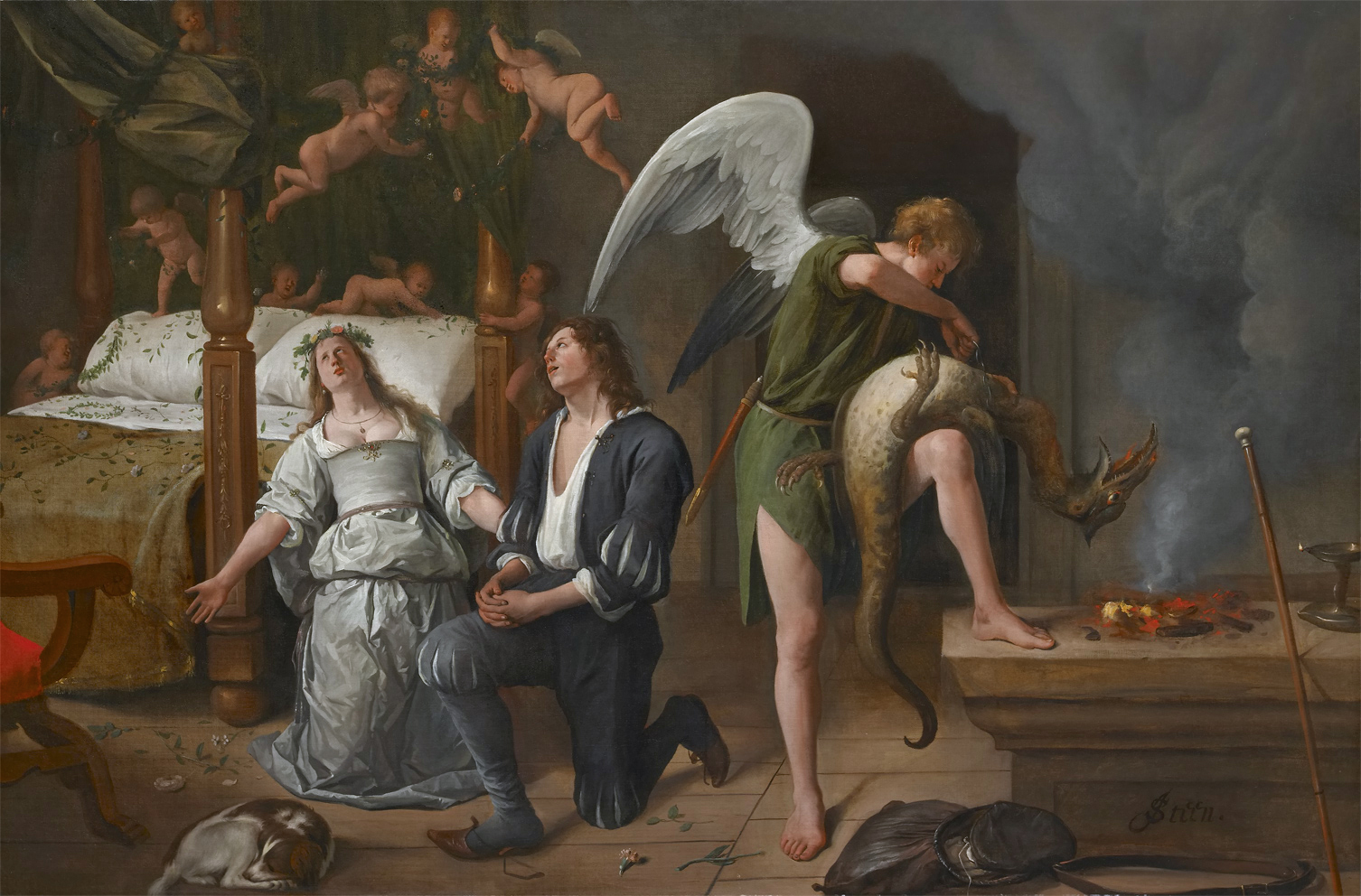
Marriage of Tobias and Sarah, circa 1660, Museum Bredius

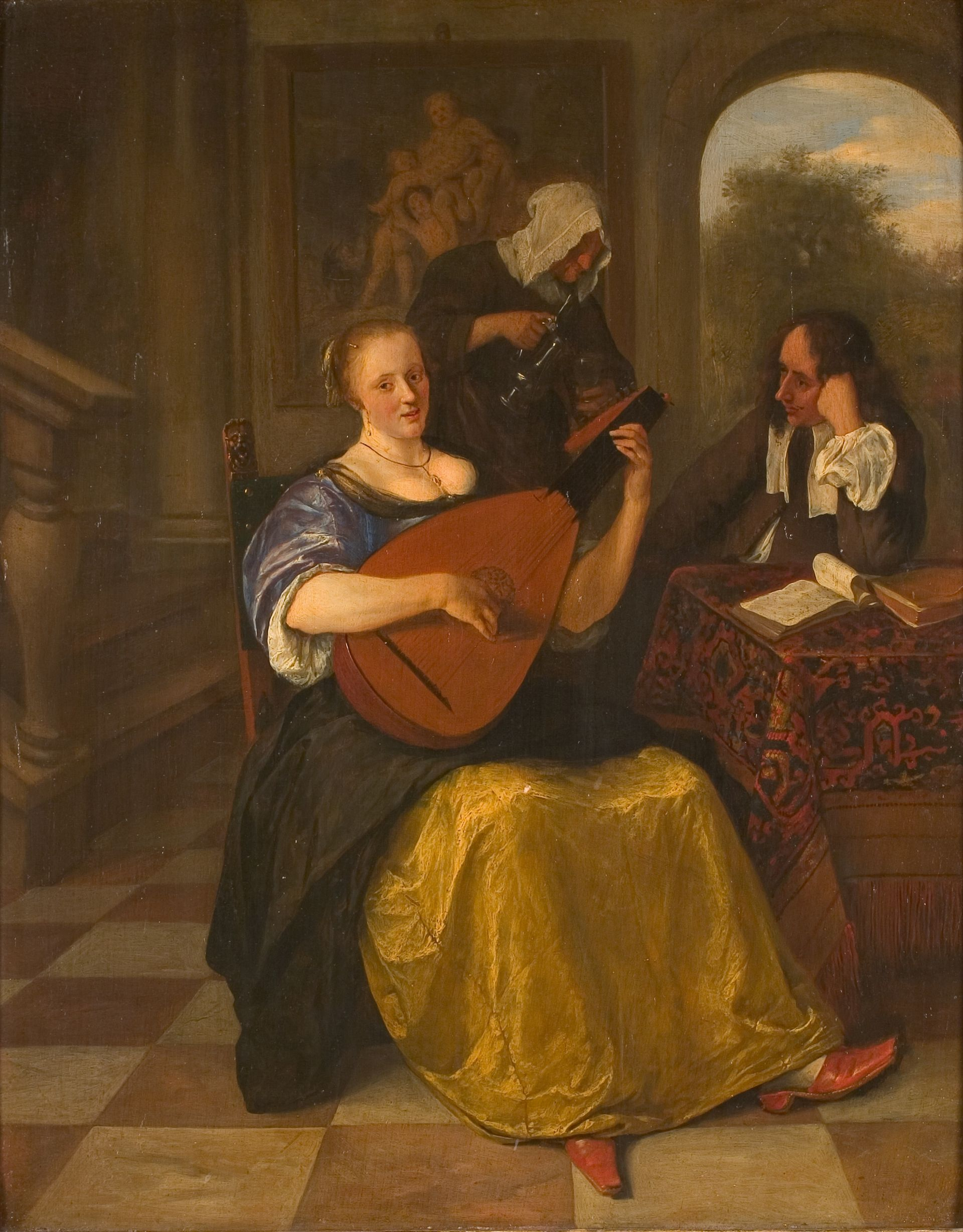
The lute player, 1660, Rijksmuseum Twenthe

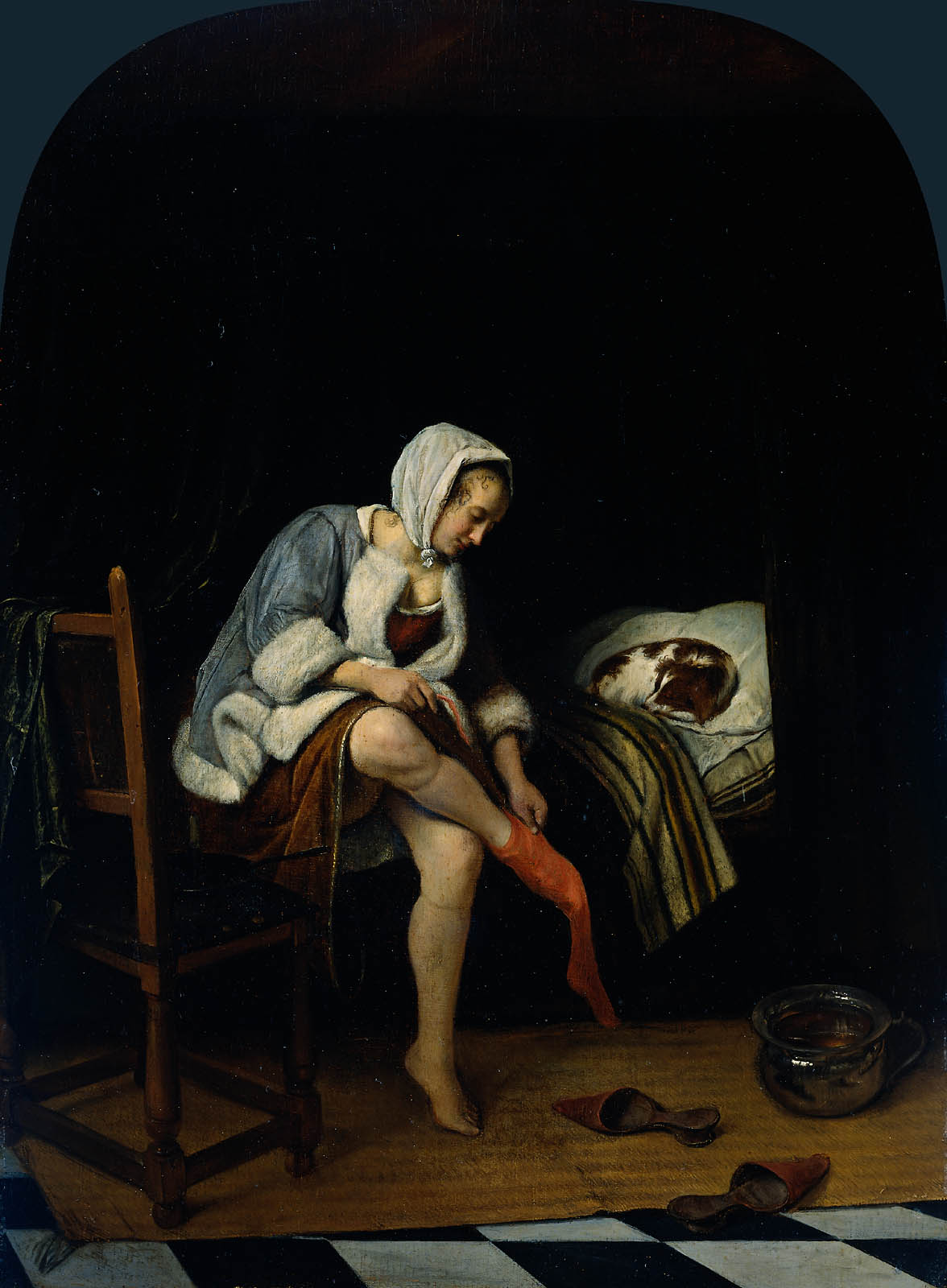
La Toilette, 1659–1660, Rijksmuseum

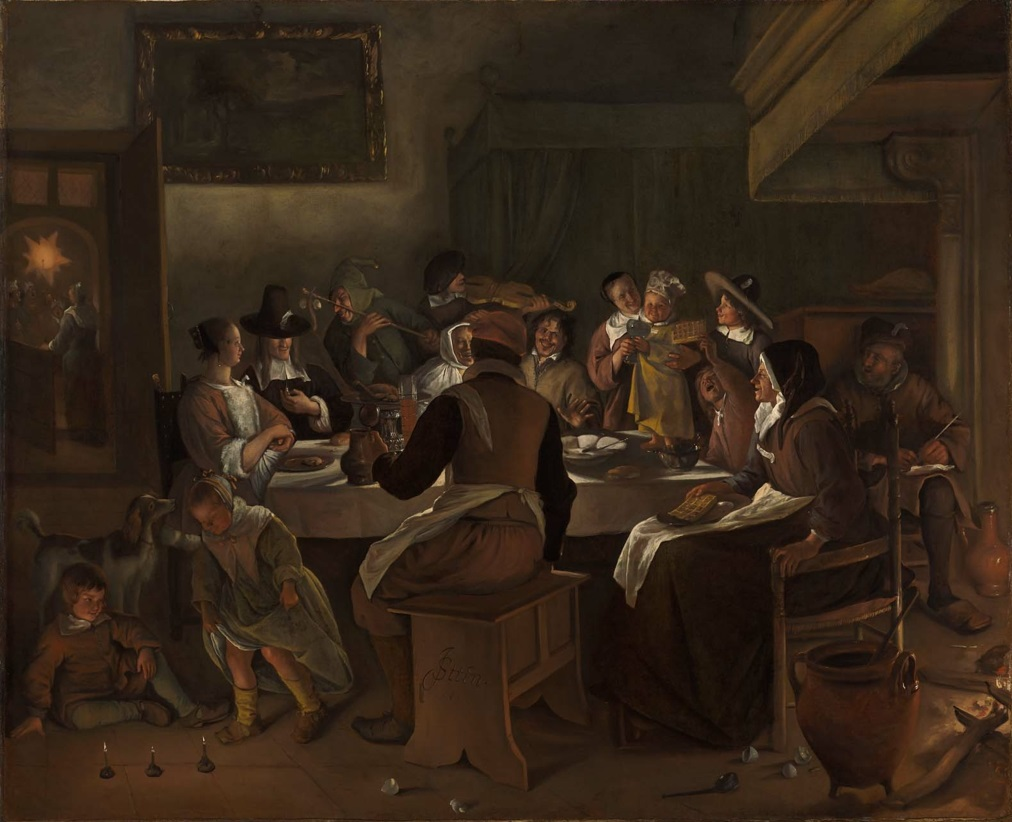
Twelfth-Night Feast, 1662, Museum of Fine Arts, Boston (54.102)

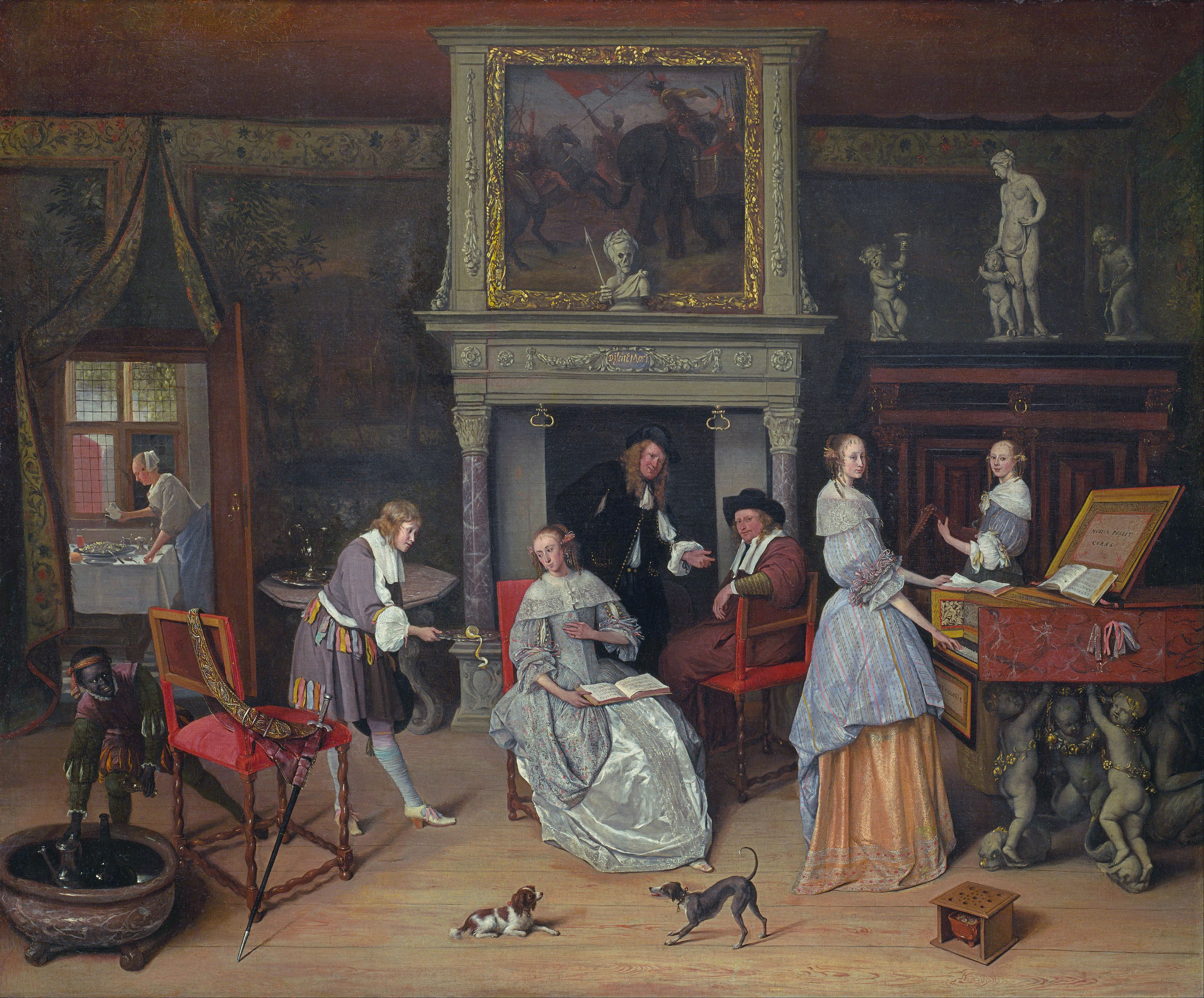
Fantasy Interior with Jan Steen and the Family of Gerrit Schouten, 1663, Nelson-Atkins Museum of Art

The Dancing Couple, 1663, National Gallery of Art

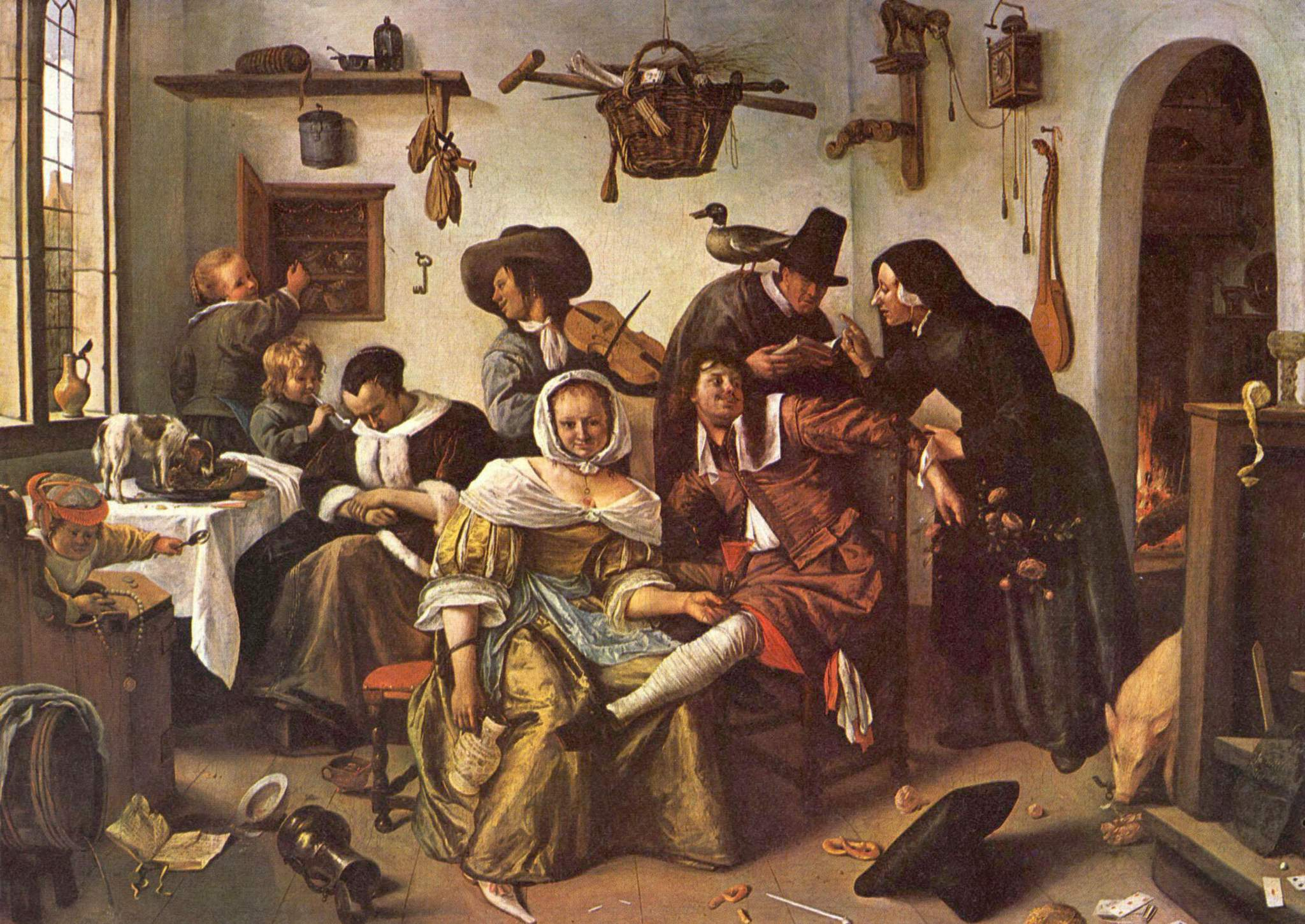
Beware of Luxury, 1663, Kunsthistorisches Museum

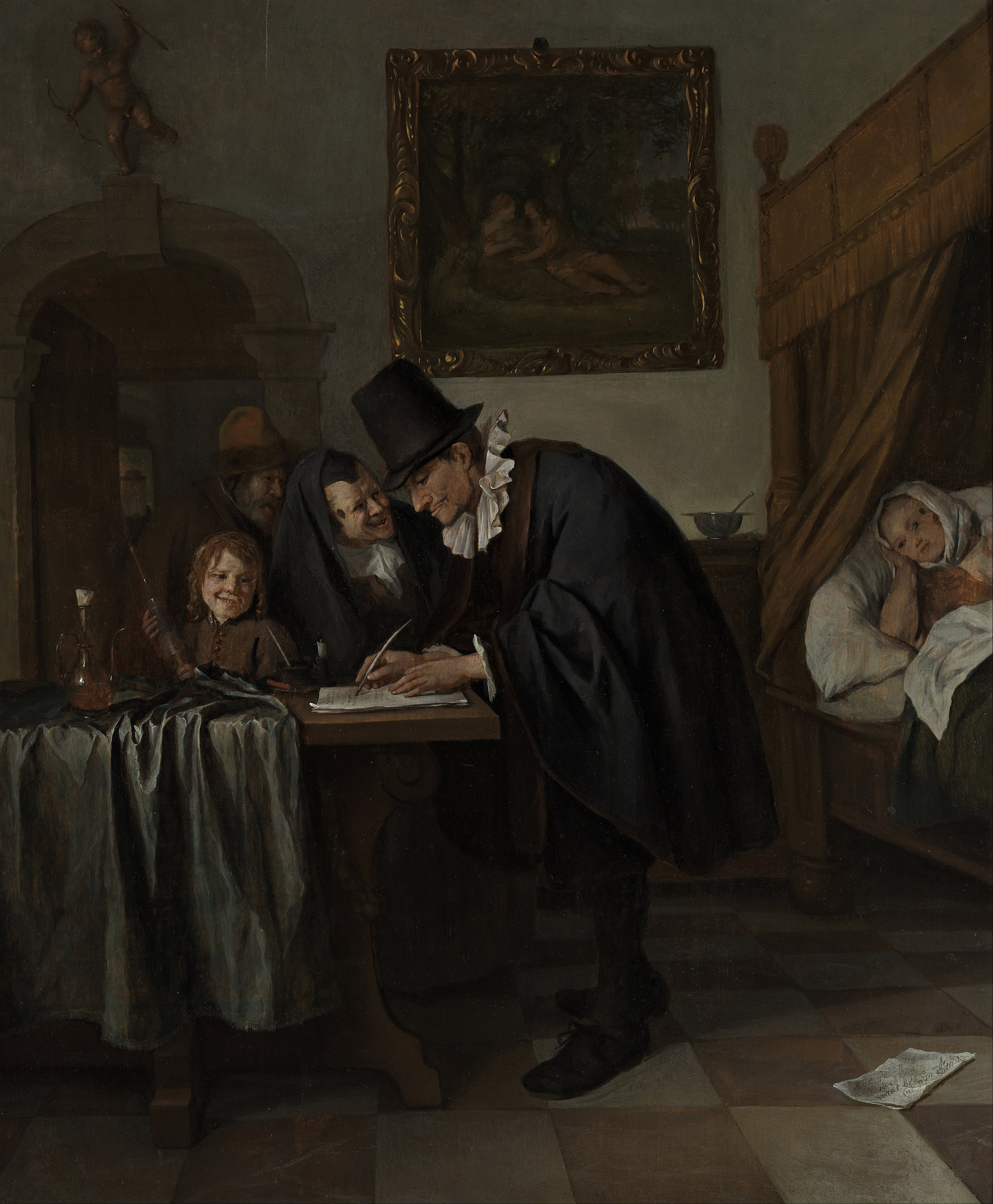
The Doctor's Visit c. 1665, Museum Boijmans Van Beuningen

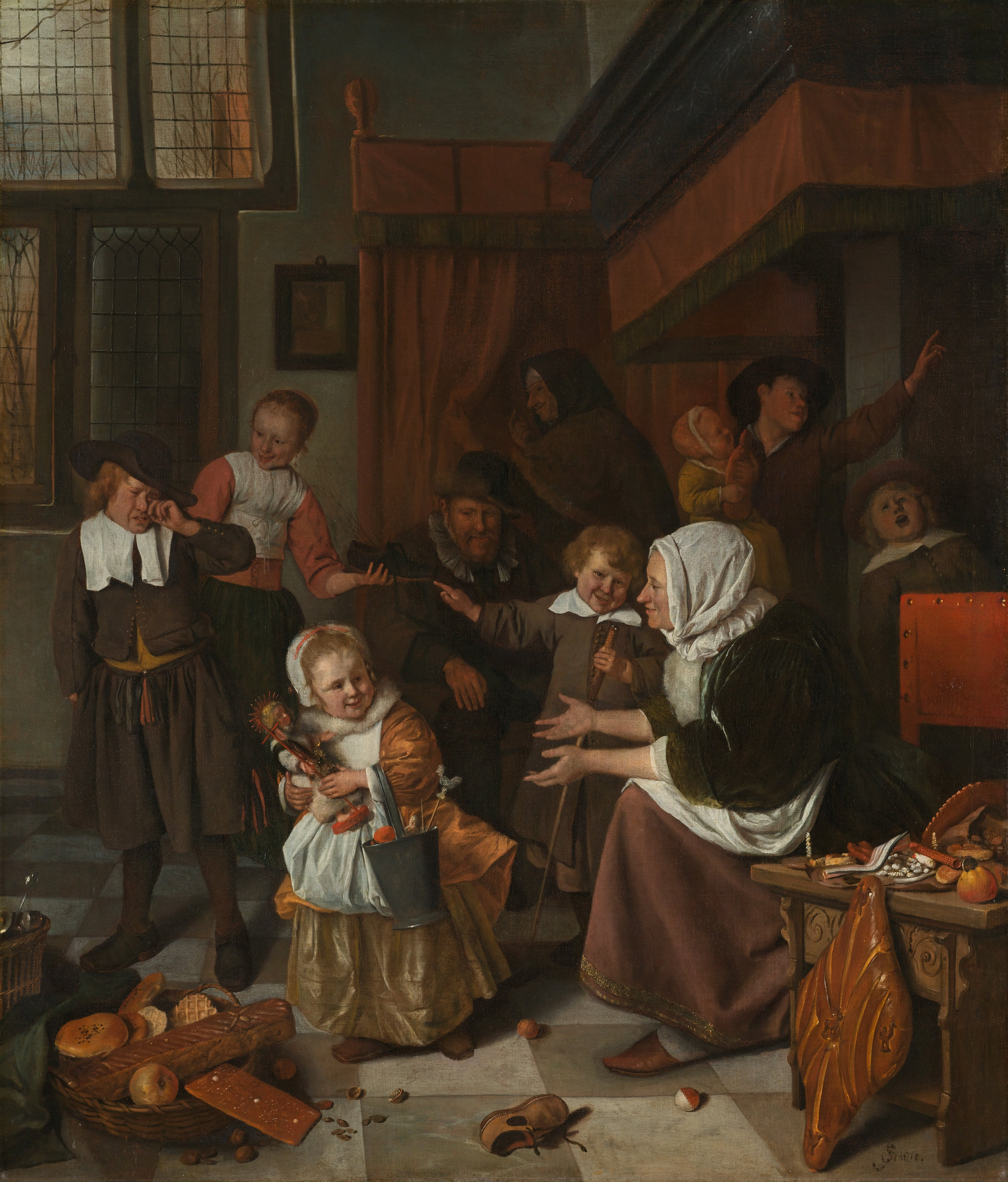
The Feast of Saint Nicholas, c. 1665–1668, Rijksmuseum

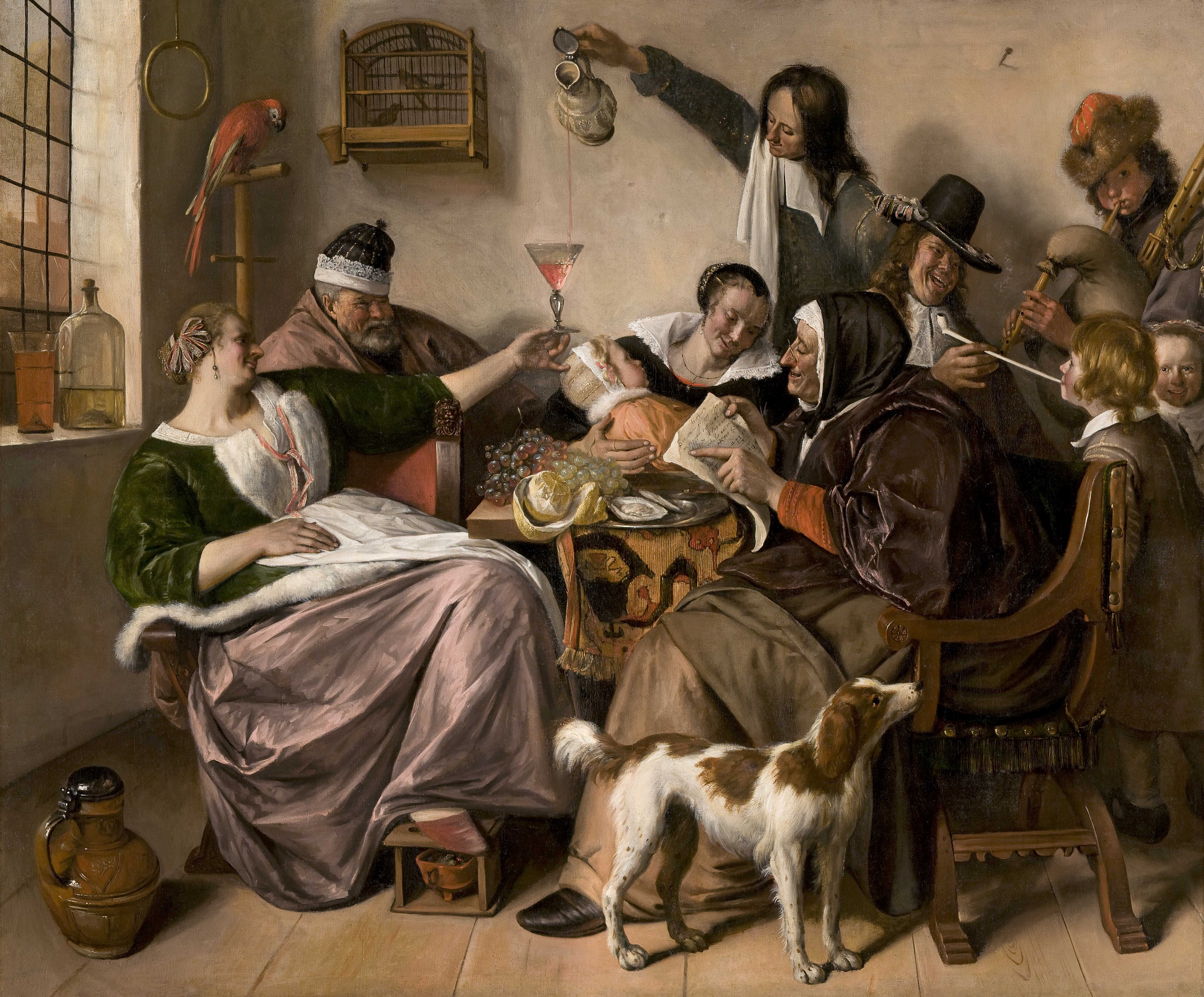
As the Old Sing, So Pipe the Young, circa 1665, Mauritshuis

As old men sing, so children squeal, 1662, Musée Fabre

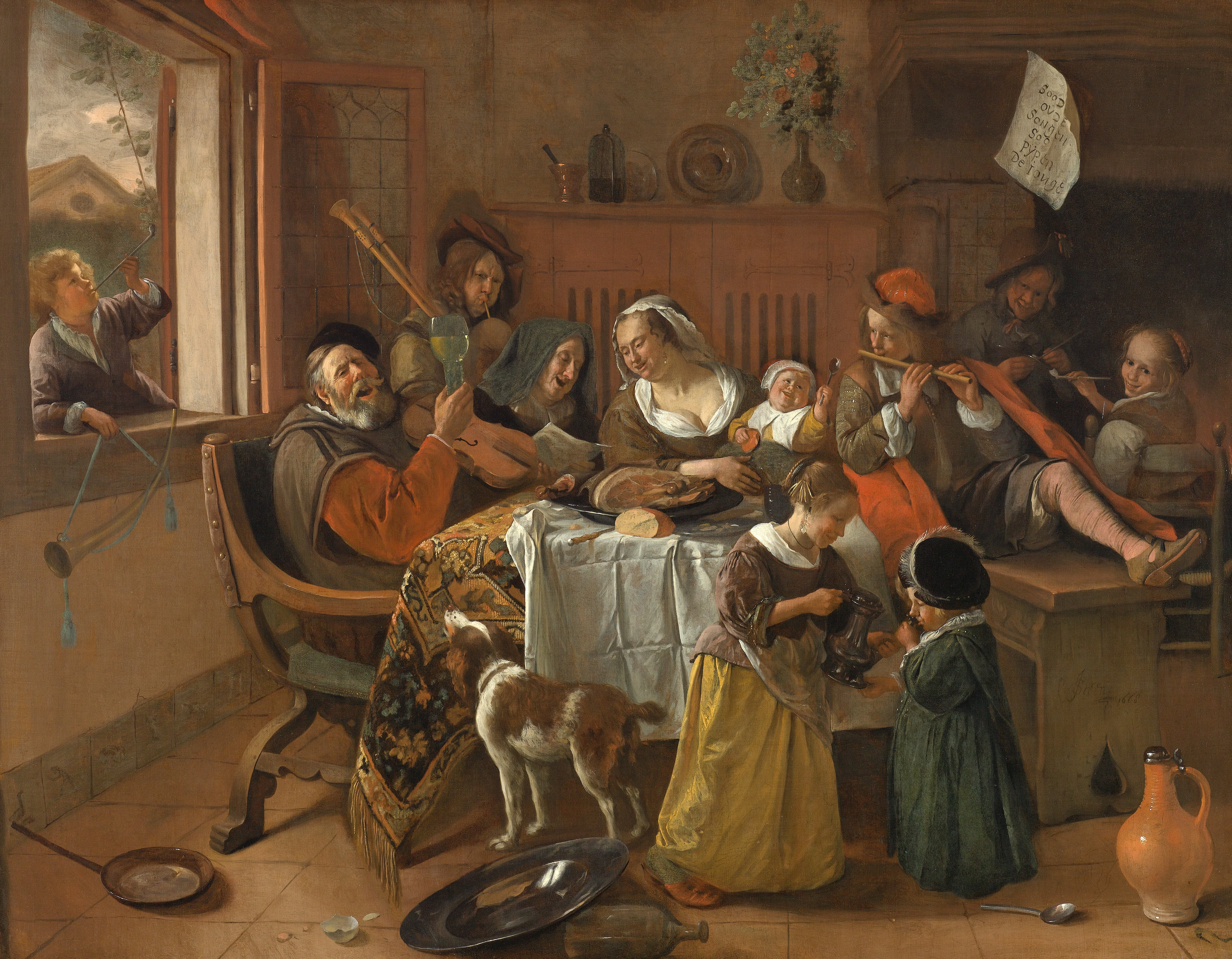
The Merry Family, 1668, Rijksmuseum
