= The Standard Bearer (Rembrandt, 1636) =

Painting by Rembrandt

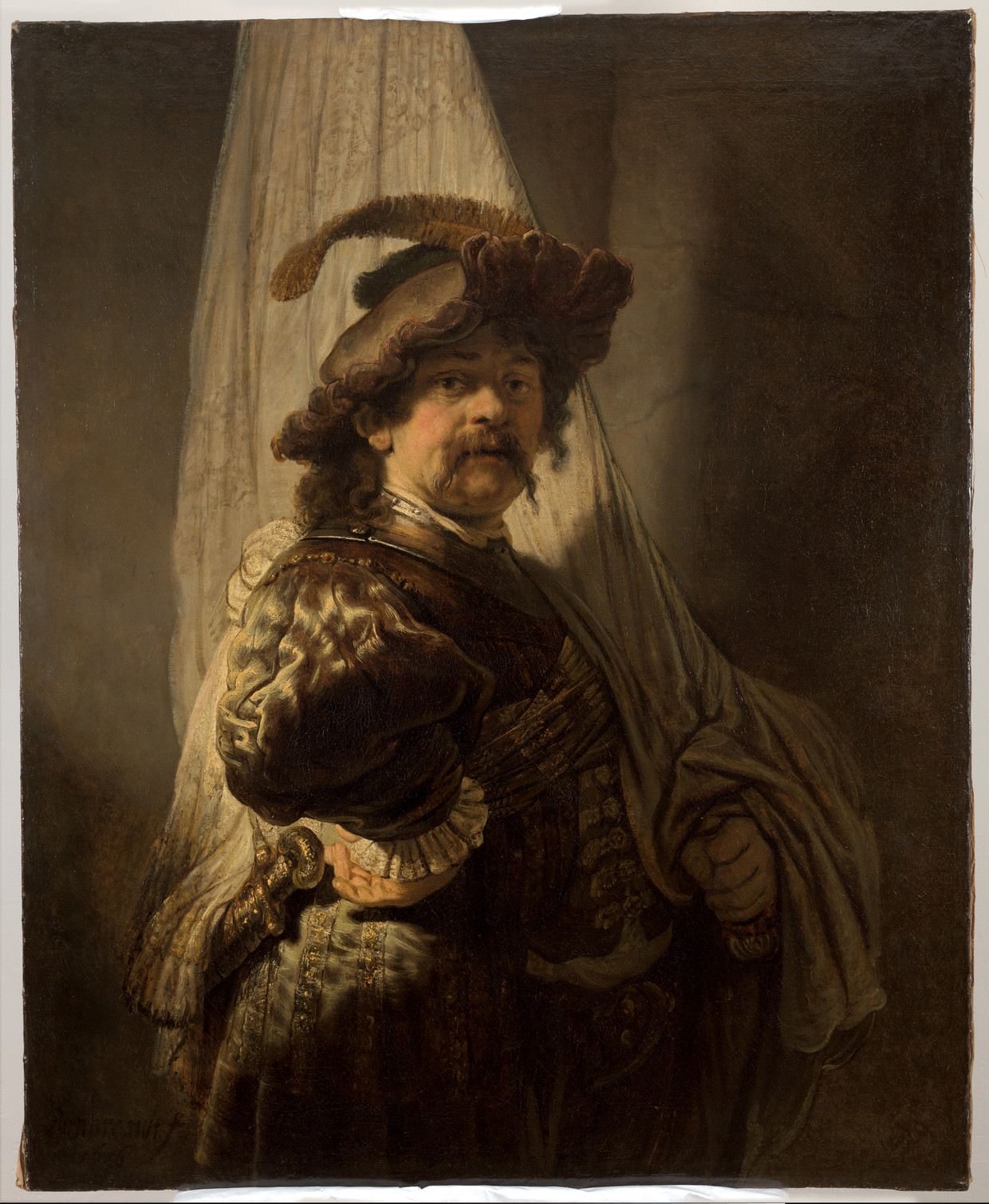
- De vaandeldrager
- Artist: Rembrandt
- Year: 1636
- Catalogue: Rembrandt Research Project, A Corpus of Rembrandt Paintings VI: #147
- Medium: Oil on canvas
- Dimensions: 118.8 cm × 96.8 cm (46.8 in × 38.1 in)
- Location: Rijksmuseum, Amsterdam

The Standard Bearer is a three-quarter-length self-portrait by Rembrandt formerly in the Paris collection of Elie de Rothschild, and purchased by the Rijksmuseum for 175 million euros with assistance from the Dutch state and Vereniging Rembrandt in 2021. It was painted on the occasion of the artist's move from Leiden to Amsterdam and is seen as an important early work that "shows Rembrandt's ambition to paint a group portrait for the Amsterdam militia, at the time the most valued commission a painter could be awarded."

Rembrandt's flag bearer has several copies in oil, and later prints may be from such copies, but this painting nevertheless has a provenance reaching far into the 18th-century. It was documented as a self-portrait by Smith in 1836, who wrote:

Rembrandt in the character of a Standard-Bearer. His portly countenance, which is seen in nearly a front view, denotes him to have been about fifty years of age; a large hat, turned up at the side, and decked with feathers, covers his head, and a steel cuirass shields his breast: the remainder of his habiliments are suitably rich and appropriate. One hand grasps the staff of an unfurled banner, and the other is placed on his side. This splendidly-coloured picture is engraved by Lause, and also by G. Haid. From the collection of Chevalier Verhulst, M. le Boeuf and M. Robit. It was afterwards in the collection of his Majesty George IV., who exchanged it with M. Lafontaine for other pictures.

— Smith, 1836

Cornelis Hofstede de Groot agreed with him in 1914, but stopped short of calling it a self-portrait. He wrote:

270 A STANDARD-BEARER. Sm. 201, and Suppl. 23; Bode 300; Dut. 148; Wb. 313; B.-HdG. 206.

He stands in profile to the right, turning his face round and looking at the spectator. With his left hand he holds a large white banner on his shoulder; his right hand is on his hip. Over his brown curls he wears a slashed cap with a brown plume; his face is shaved, save for the long moustache. Over his yellowish-brown coat, trimmed with lace, he wears an iron gorget and a broad sash from which a sword hangs at his side. He has loose sleeves and a white collar and wrist-bands. Strong light from the left touches his back and his face and falls full on the banner. Life size, three-quarter length. The man has Rembrandt's features.

Signed on the right at foot, "Rembrandt 163-" the last figure, now illegible, was probably a 5; canvas, 50 by 42 inches [1,300 mm × 1,100 mm].

A copy is in the Cassel Gallery, 1903 catalogue, No. 251 (Wb. 53); it has been there since the 1749 inventory, and was etched by N. Mossoloff.

Another copy is in the collection of the late P. A. B. Widener, Philadelphia, 1908 catalogue, No. 242. Other copies were in the

Sales. J. F. Wolschot, Antwerp, September 1, 1817, No. 12.

Duke of Buckingham, Stowe, August 15, 1848, No. 415 (£54 : 12s., Wakeford Attree).

Etched by P. Louw, J. F. Clerck, G. Haid.

Mentioned by Vosmaer, pp. 340, 554; by Bode, p. 597; by Dutuit, p. 52; [by Michel, pp. 166-7, 169, 436].

Exhibited at the British Institution, London, 1819, No. 59, and 1836, No. 34.

Sales. L. van Heemskerk, Leyden, September 2, 1771, No. I (61 florins, Delfos); to judge from the price, this was one of the copies. G. F. J. de Verhulst, Brussels, August 16, 1779, No - 8o ( 354 florins or, according to other authorities, 1290 francs, Fouquet). Le Boeuf, Paris, 1782 (5300 francs). Robit, Paris, May 21, 1801, No. 117 of Bryan's catalogue (3095 francs, Lafontaine).

In the collection of George IV., King of England, who exchanged it with Lafontaine for other pictures.

In the possession of the London dealer Lafontaine. In the collection of Sir Simon H. Clarke, London.

In the collection of Lady Clarke, Oak Hill, 1836 (Sm., who valued it at 525).

Sale. Sir Simon Clarke, Bart., London, May 8, 1840 (840, Baron James de Rothschild, Paris).

In the collection of Baron Henry de Rothschild, Paris.

— Hofstede de Groot, 1914

== 2022 acquisition by the Netherlands ==
In 2019 the painting has been classified as a national treasure of France, so an export bar was in place for 30 months while the Louvre tried to raise funds to buy the painting. The museum was unable to do so and waived its right of first refusal for purchase. In December 2021, the Dutch state announced its intention to buy the work for the national collection.

As result, the Rothschild family sold the painting to the Netherlands for €175 million in 2022. The Dutch government paid €150 million, while the Rembrandt Association and the Rijksmuseum contributed a total of €25 million. It was bought from the Rothschild family, who had owned it since 1844, via a trust located in the tax haven of the Cook Islands. The Standard Bearer was sent to tour every province in the Netherlands before going on display at the Rijksmuseum's Gallery of Honour. It was acquired during the COVID-19 pandemic amid media coverage of failing income for the Netherlands' cultural sector. The painting had previously been shown at the Rijksmuseum in 2019 and had attracted the museum's interest once France agreed to let the painting leave the country.

The painting toured the Netherlands in 2022 and 2023.

== Notable copies ==
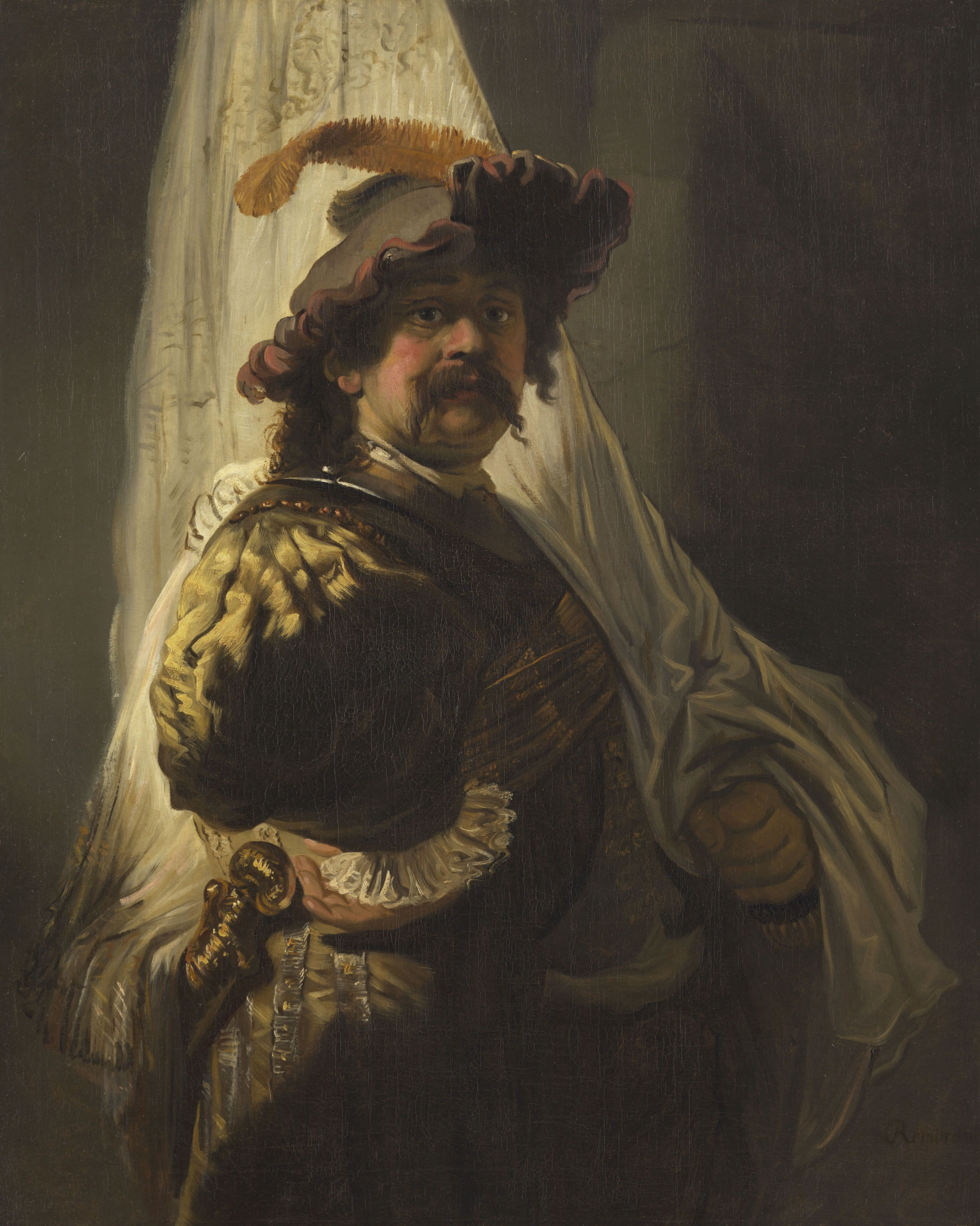
Version in Kassel

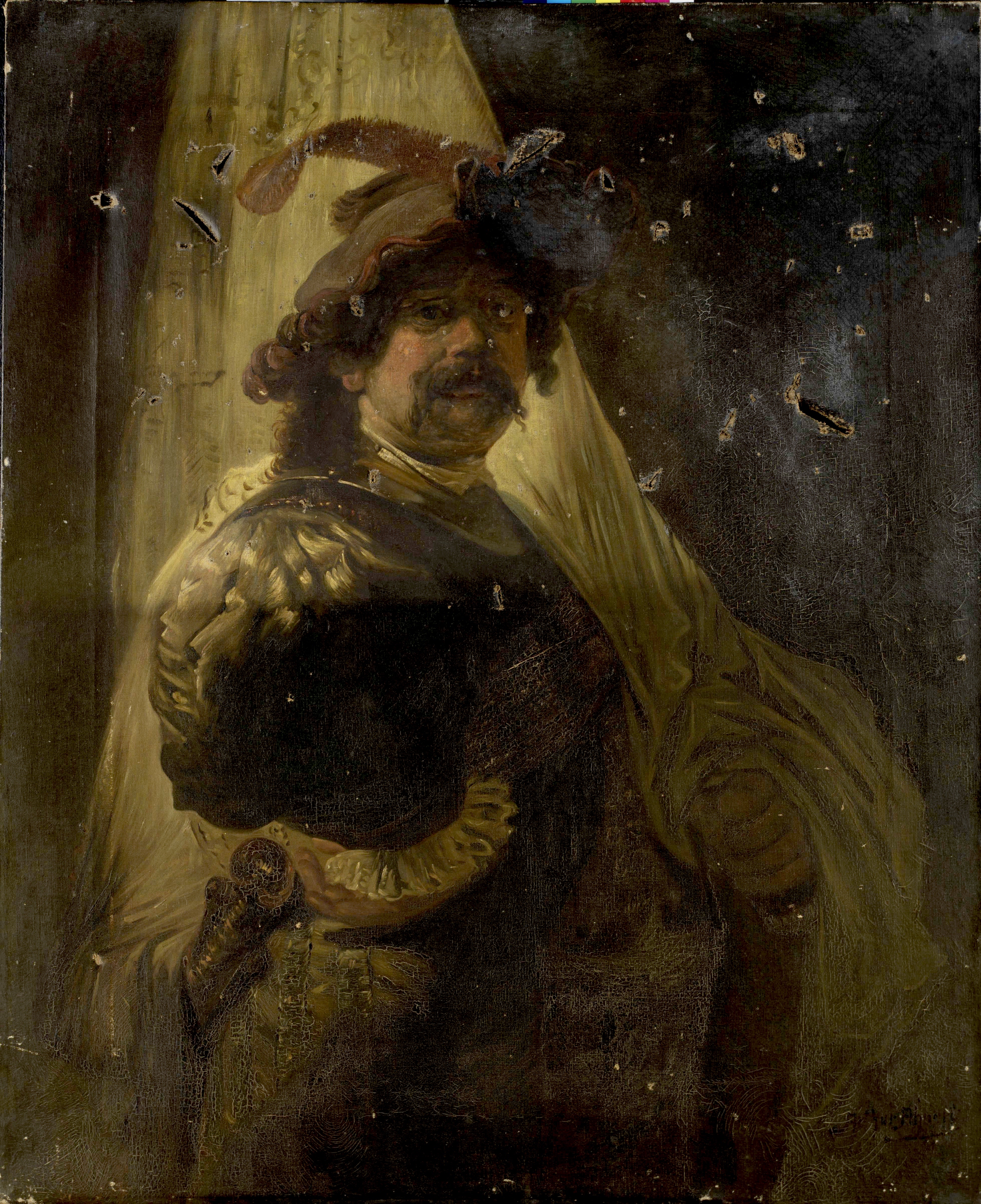
Copy of the Kassel copy, damaged

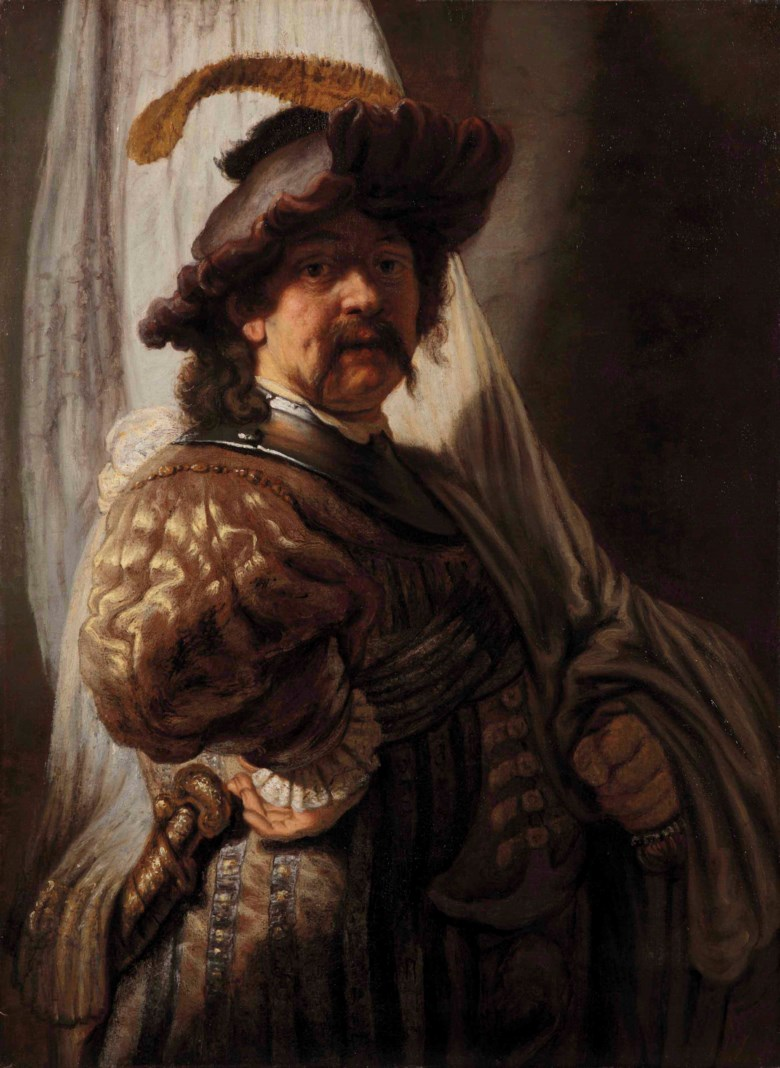
Version in Widener collection

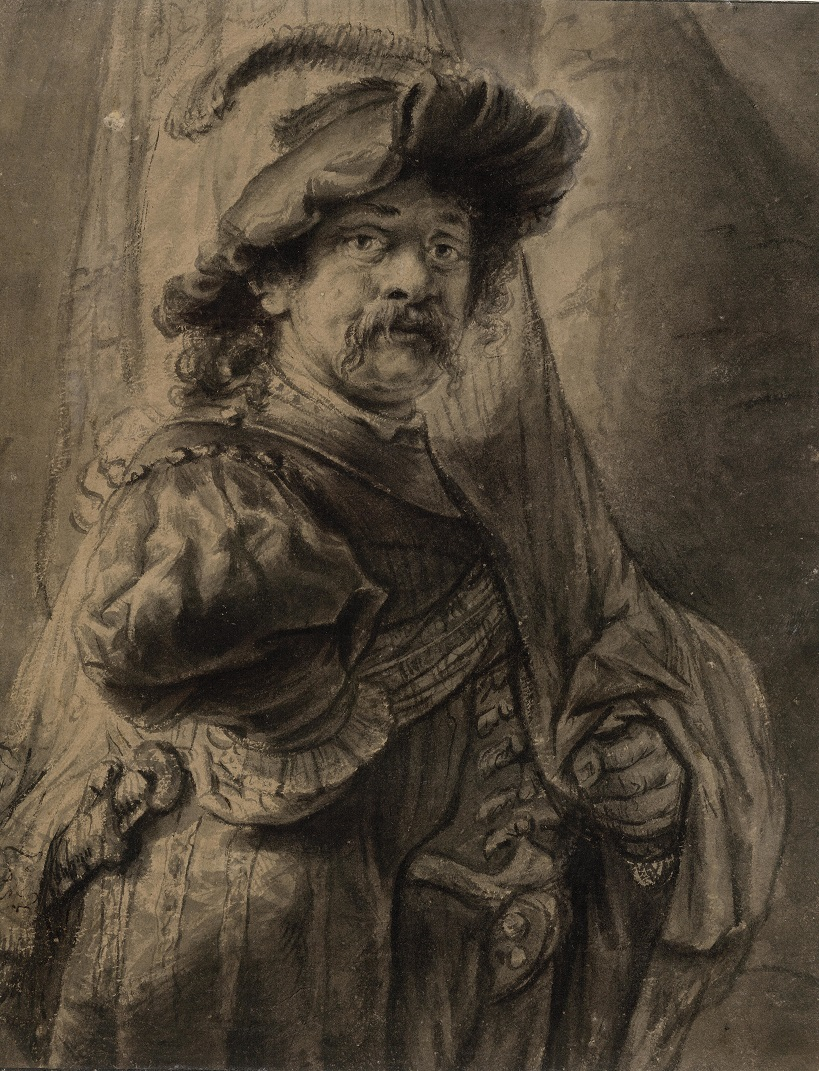
Version by Ferdinand Bol

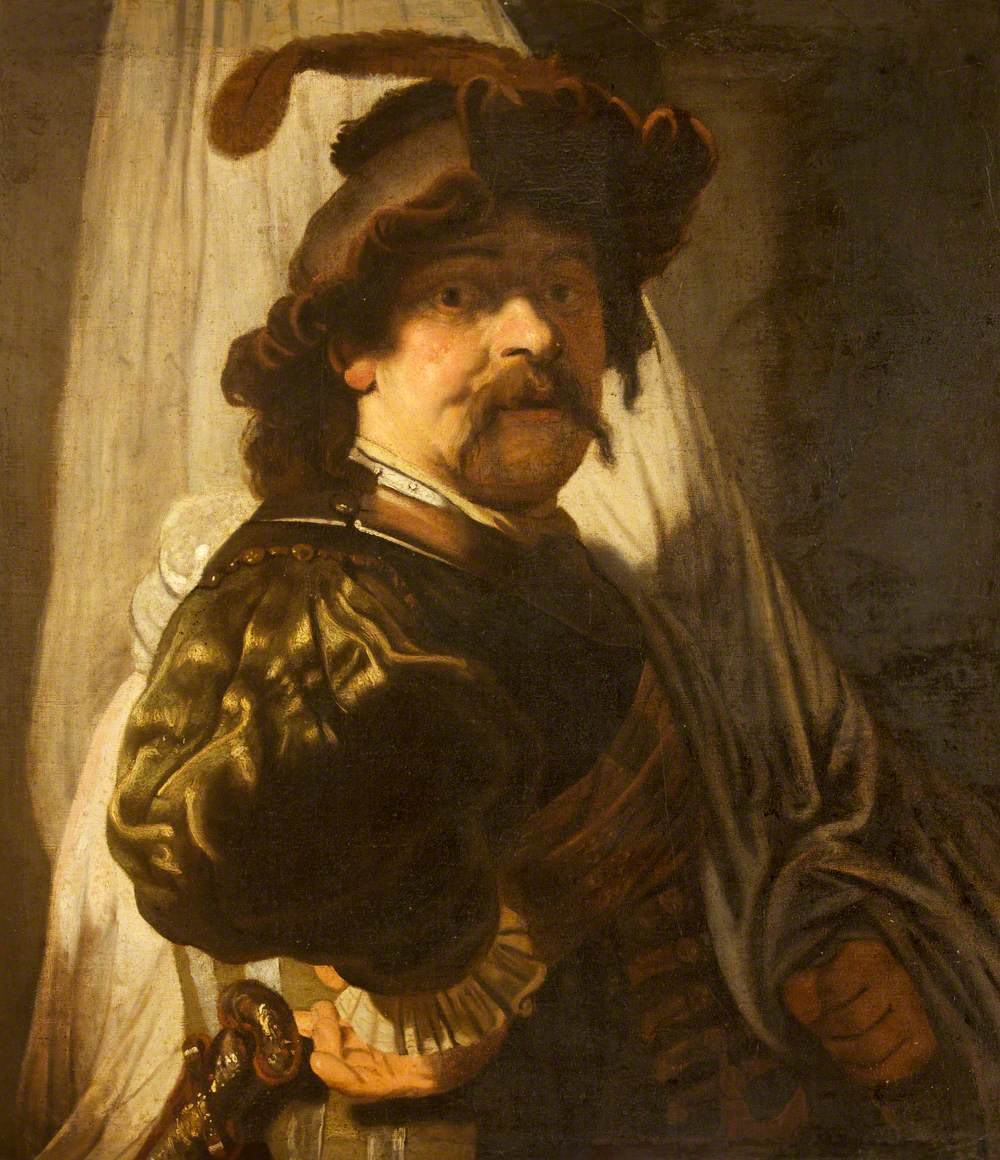
Version in Philipps House

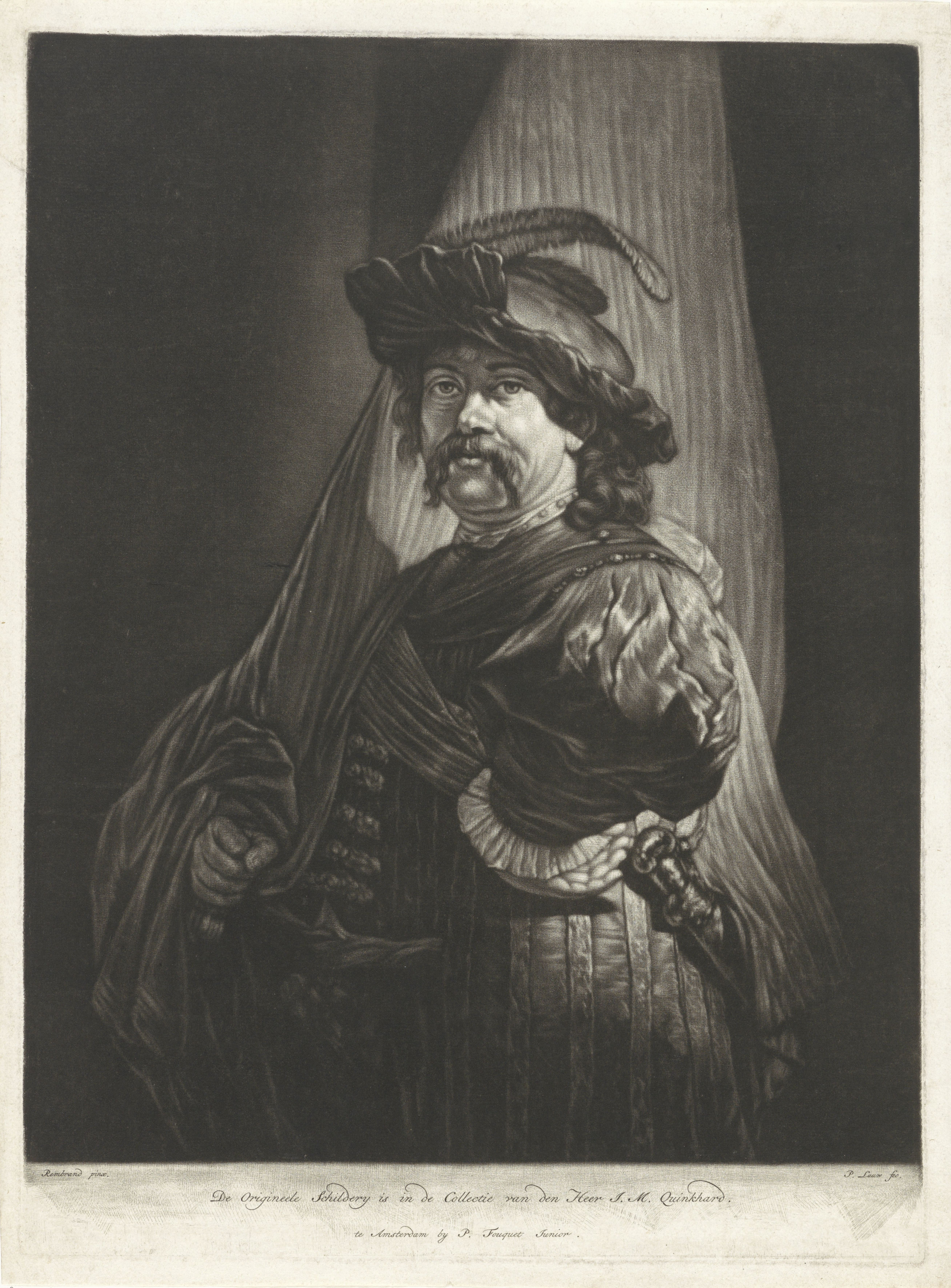
Mezzotint by Pieter Louw

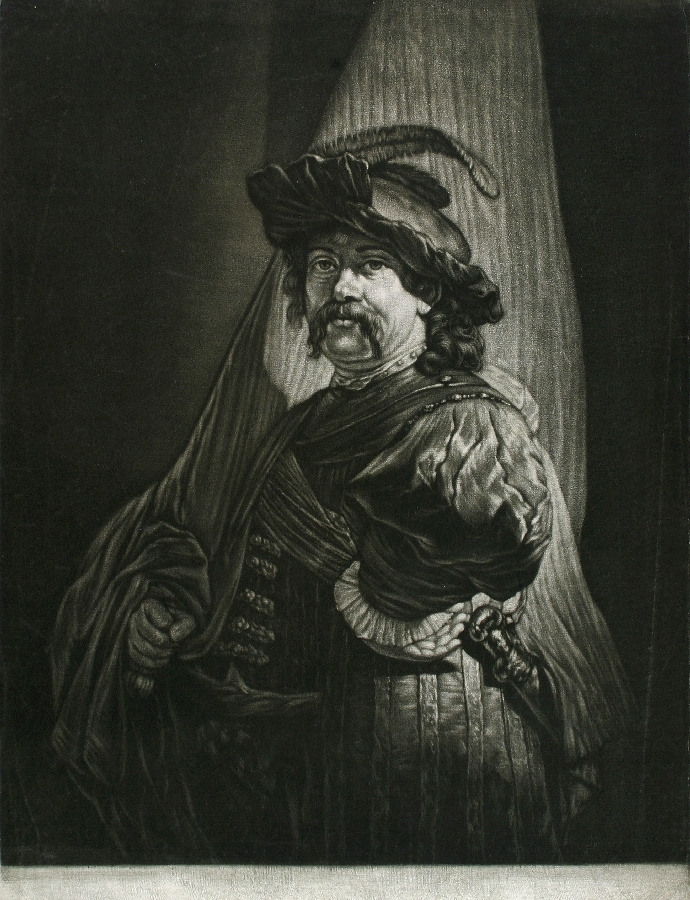
Mezzotint by Johann Peter Pichler

== See also ==
- List of most expensive paintings
- List of paintings by Rembrandt
