= Anna Maria Ebeling =

Dutch artist and art collector

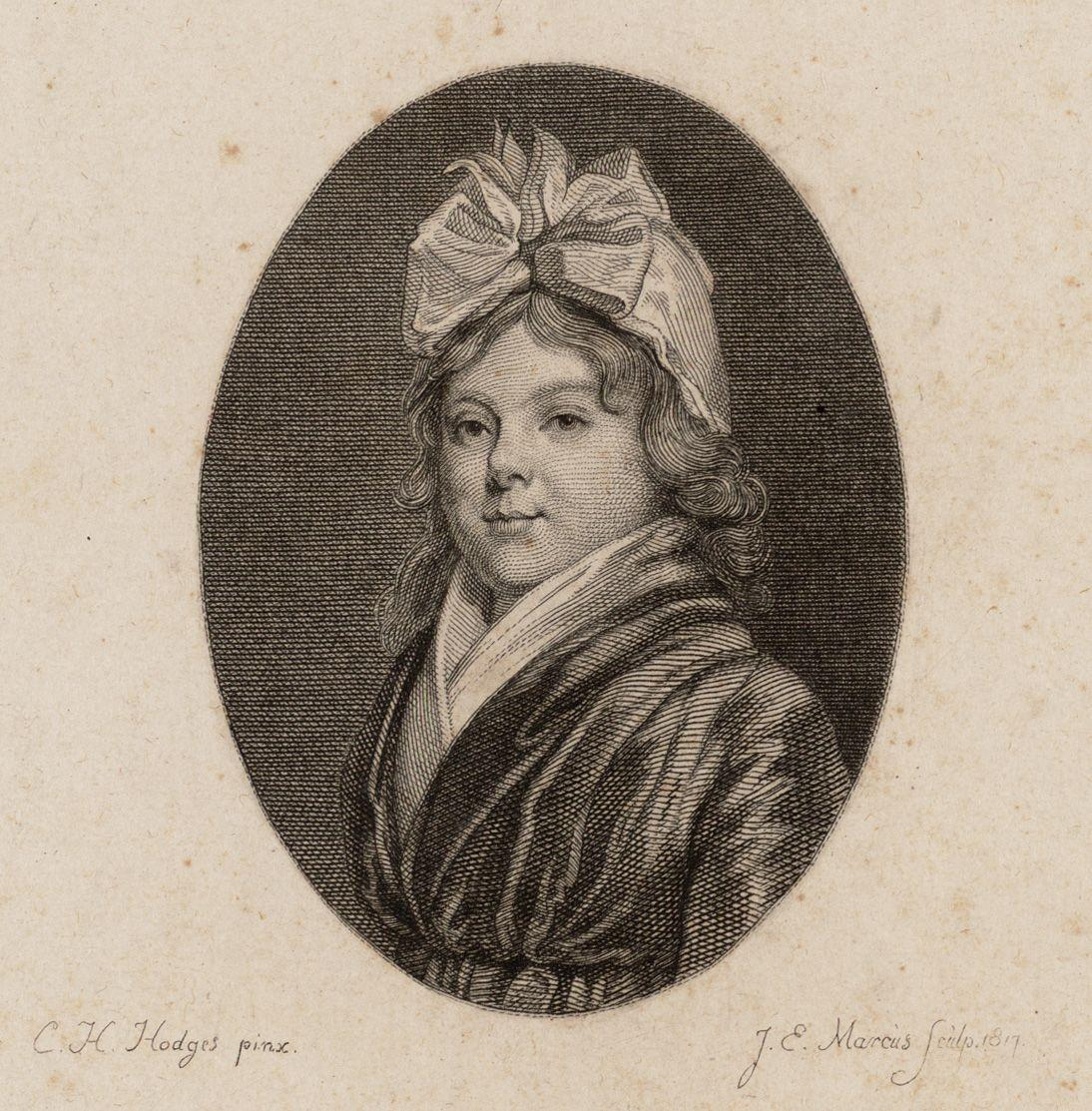
- Engraving by Jacob Ernst Marcus after a painting by Charles Howard Hodges
- Born: October 13, 1767; Amsterdam
- Died: June 29, 1812 (aged 44)

Anna Maria Ebeling or A.M. Hogguer-Ebeling (October 13, 1767 – June 29, 1812) was a Dutch artist and art collector best known for her art collection which sold for 80,000 florins in 1817.

Ebeling was born in Amsterdam to a well-to-do merchant family. When her father chose the side of the French during the troubles of the 1780s, the family had to flee the city in 1787. Anna Maria married the banker Paul Iwan Hogguer a few months later in 1788. Through the connections of her husband she had access to all the art "cabinets" of Amsterdam and began collecting on her own. She probably was able to take drawing classes in some of these cabinets, and is registered as a pupil of the painter Pieter Louw, who had been director of the city drawing society since 1768 and who died in 1800.

Little remains of her own work, though here and there drawings are recorded, but she was honored as the first female member of the Amsterdam drawing society. In 1790 the couple's only child, Ernestina Henrietta Maria Paulina was born, but Anna Maria continued drawing lessons, since after Louw's death she was honored 15 November 1801 with full membership in the society and was noted as pupil of Izaak Schmidt. In 1798 she received a medal from the Society for saving victims of drowning (Dutch: Maatschappij tot Redding van drenkelingen) because she pulled a boy out of the canal and brought him inside to recover. Her membership in the drawing society continued each year until her death, which occurred a year after she lost her only child. Her husband remarried in 1812 and sold her art collection in 1817.

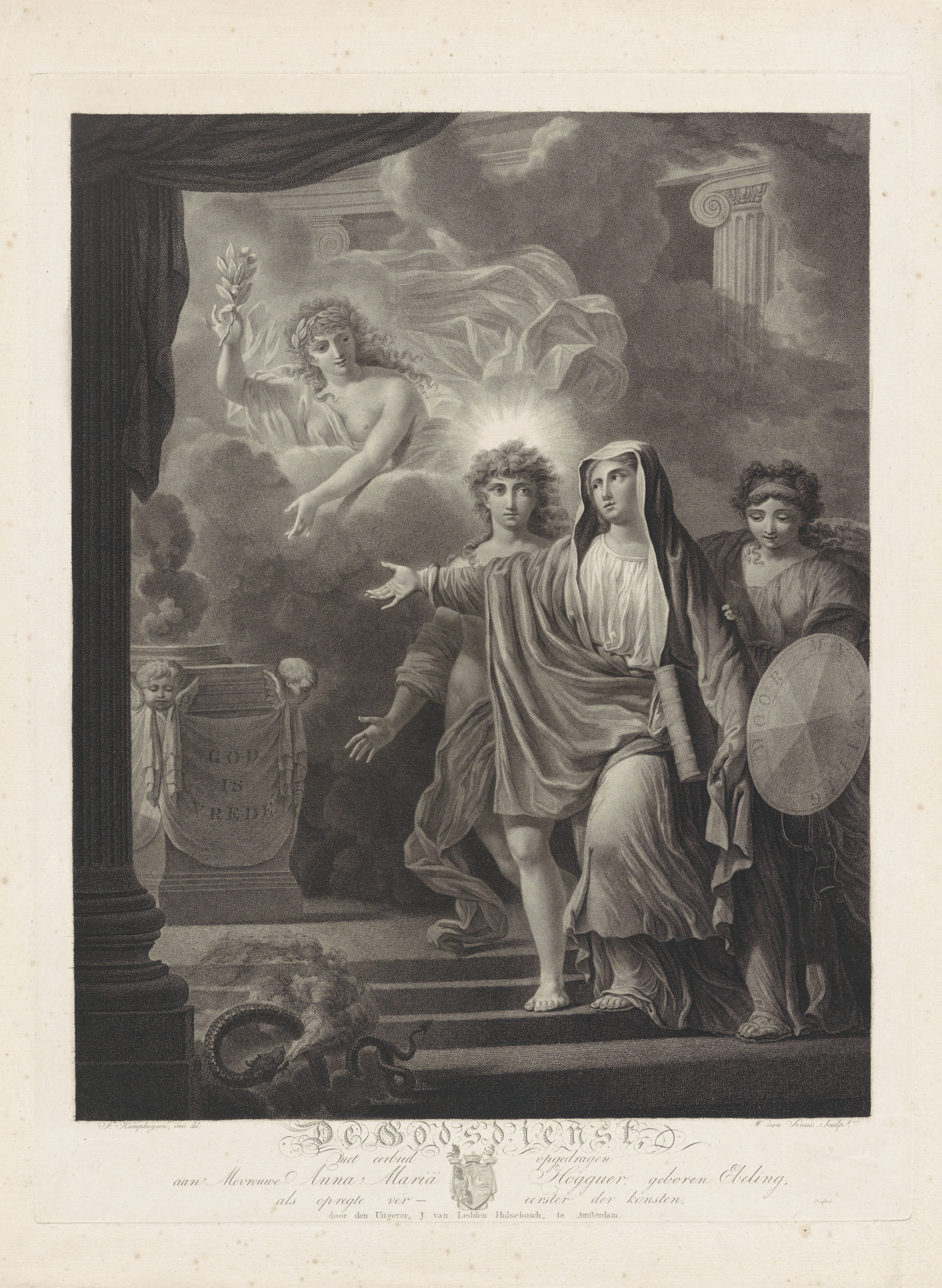
Allegory of Faith dedicated to Anna Maria Ebeling, by Jan Kamphuysen

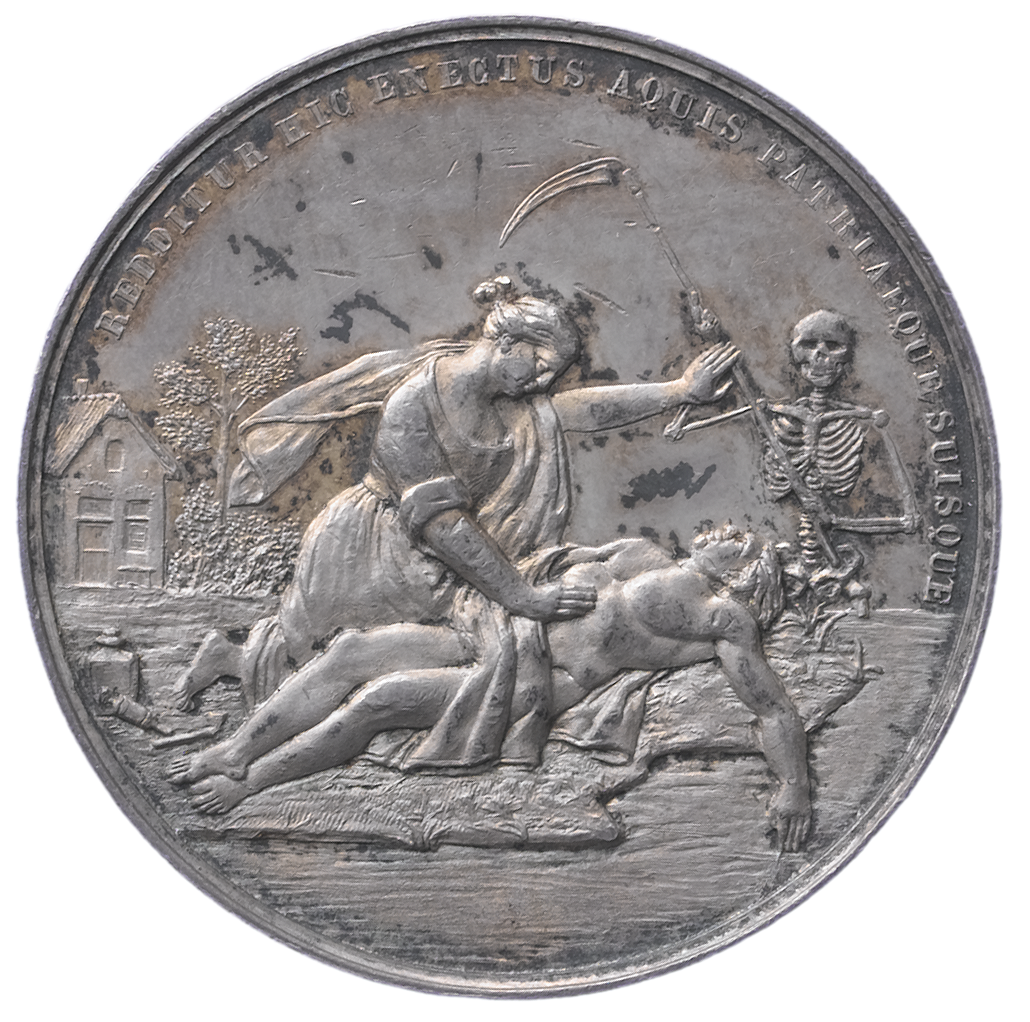
Example of the type of medal she would have received. Presumably she brought the child in to the drawing society (she didn't live on a canal yet in 1798)

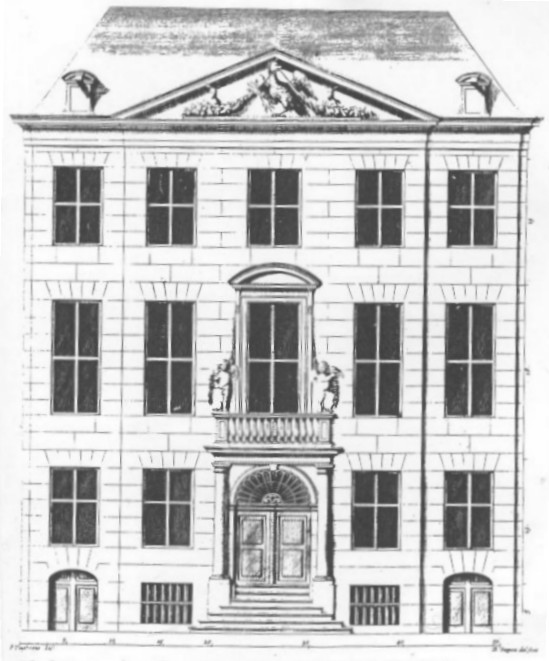
Herengracht 466, where she lived from 1804 until her death

== Collection ==
Her collection was mostly works by Dutch artists popular in her circle.

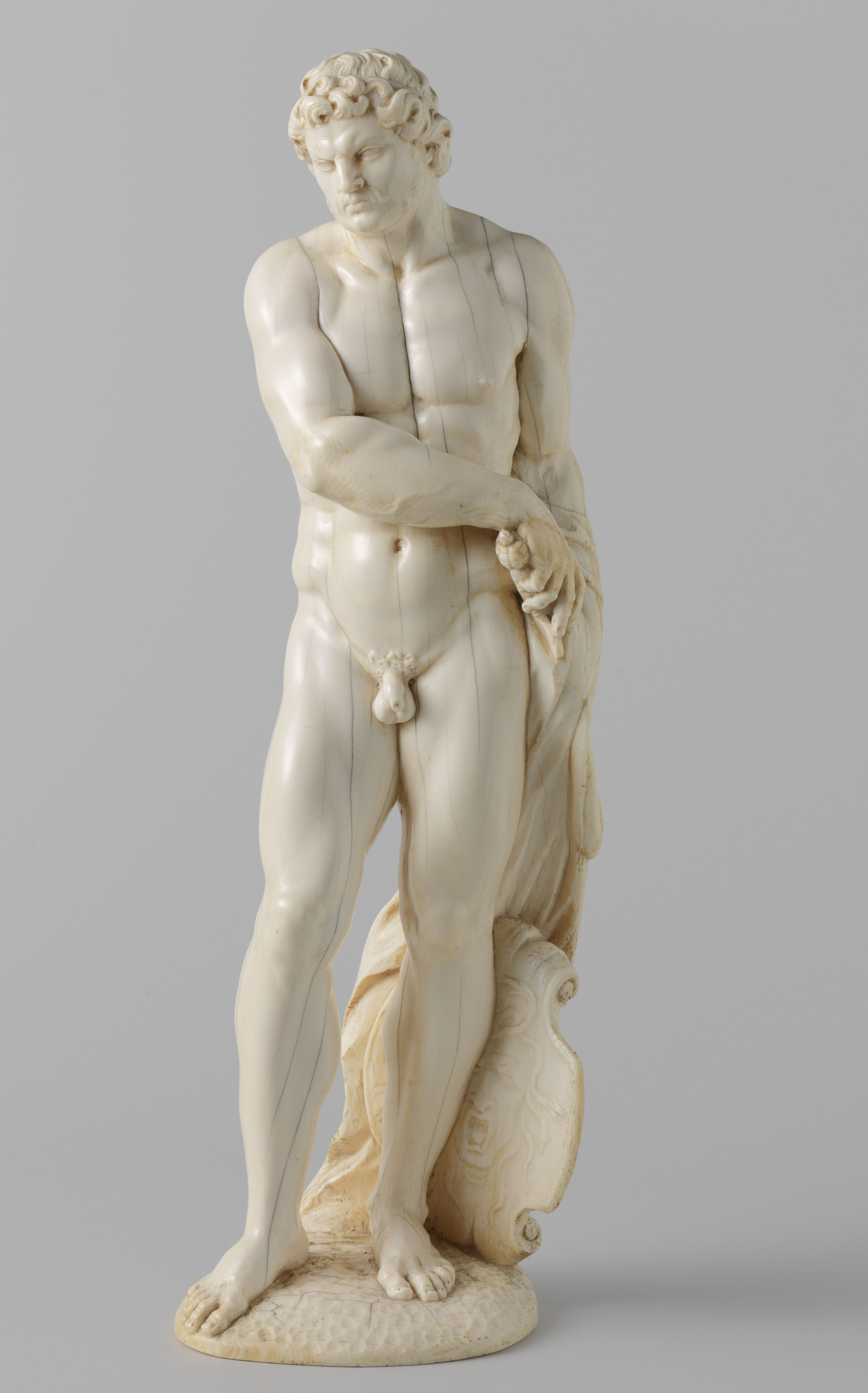
10 items by Francis van Bossuit were in her collection, and this one had been owned by Petronella de la Court

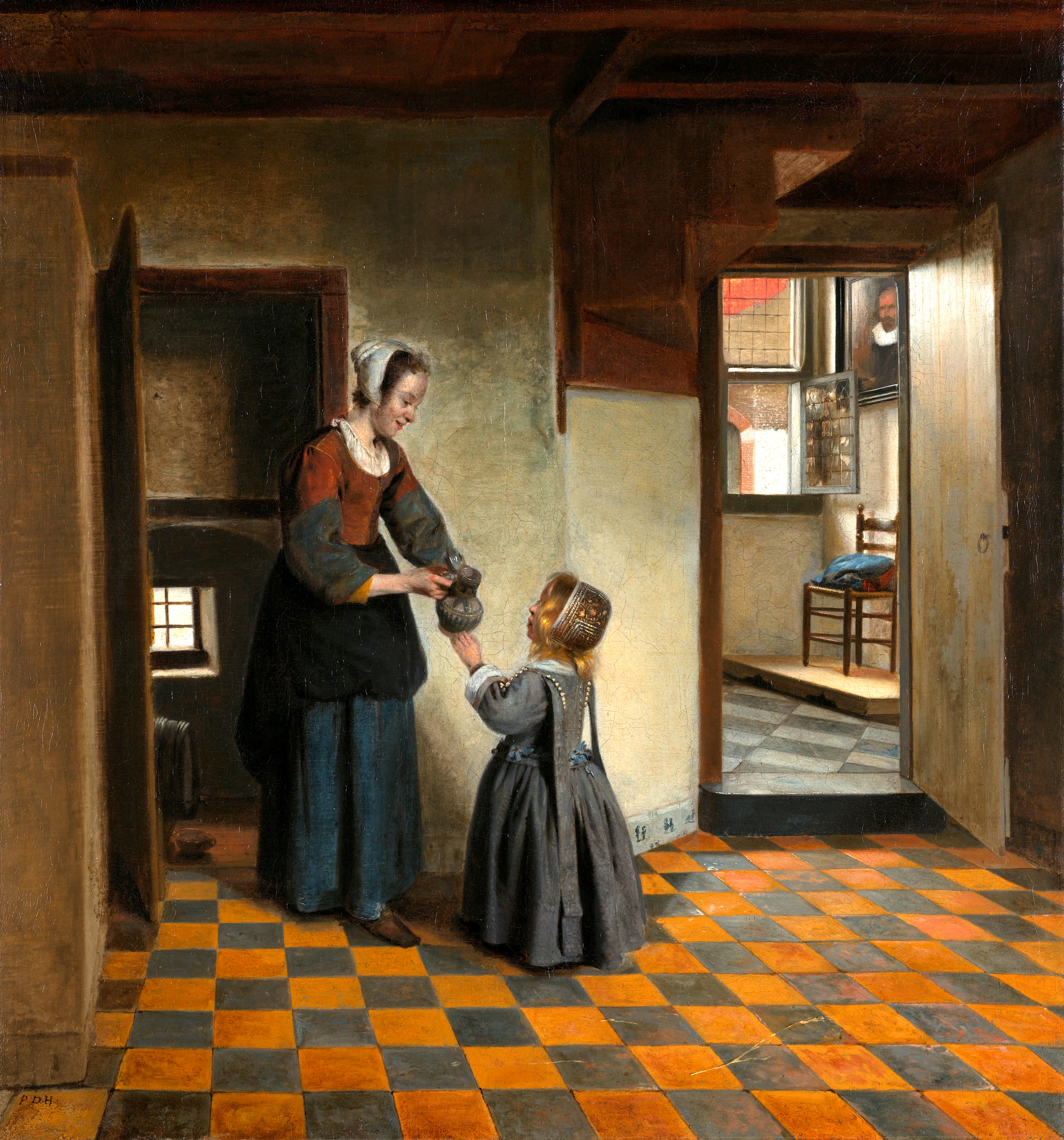
A Woman with a Child in a Pantry by Pieter de Hooch

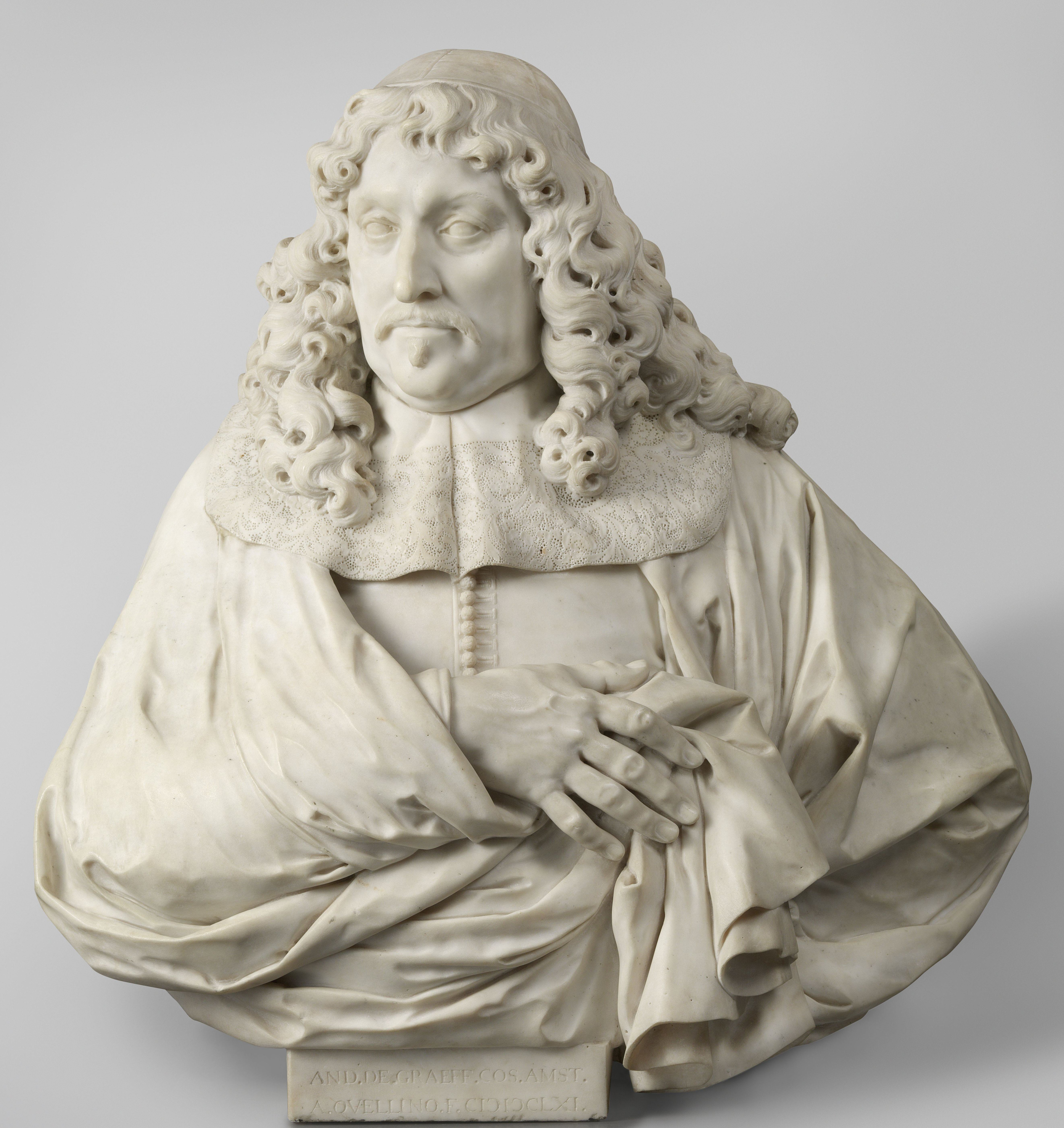
Portrait bust of Andries de Graeff, by Artus Quellinus the Elder
