= Maria Hoofman =

19th-century art collector from the Northern Netherlands

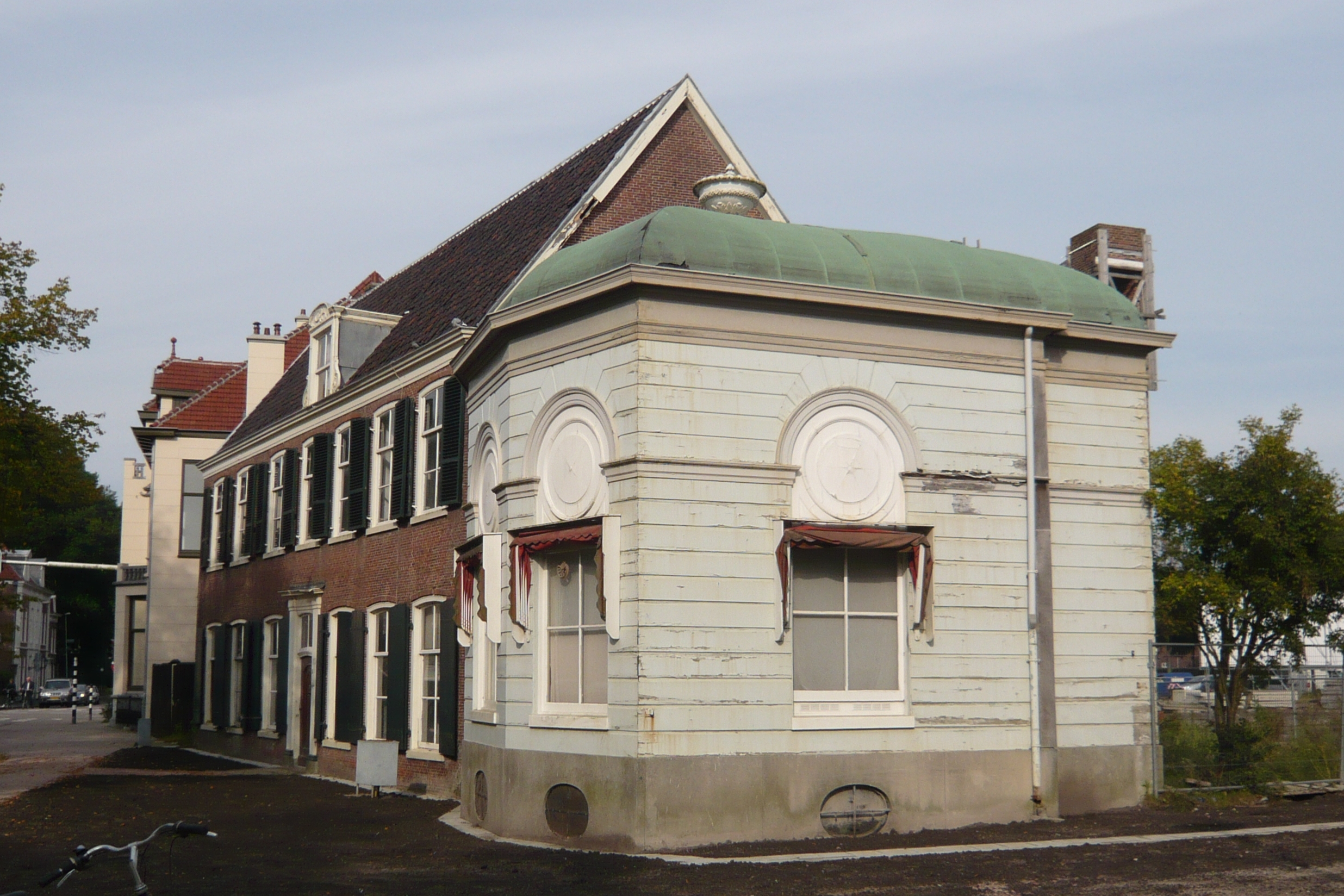
The little garden pavilion is all that remains of Maria Hoofman's "Bellevue" estate

Maria Hoofman (1776–1845), was a 19th-century art collector from the Netherlands.

== Biography ==
She was born in Haarlem as the daughter of Jacob Hoofman, an art collector who was a member of Trouw moet Blycken and director of Koninklijke Hollandsche Maatschappij der Wetenschappen. He owned works by leading Dutch masters that he had mostly inherited, including two works by Maria Sybille Merian now in Teylers Museum. After Jacob died in 1799, Maria inherited half of the collection and her sister Margaretha inherited the other half, though some of this half rejoined the collection in 1807 when Margaretha died.

Maria never married, and ordered a small pavilion built on the Kleine Houtweg in Haarlem after a design by Abraham van der Hart. Her art collection filled a gap for visitors left when Henry Hope's gallery in Villa Welgelegen closed. His art collection across the park from Maria's house had been removed to London in 1794. Maria was an artist herself and from 1822 she was an honorary member of the Koninklijke Academie voor Beeldende Kunsten in Amsterdam.

She died in Haarlem and her collection was sold.

== Former collection ==
According to Adriaan van der Willigen in his Geschiedenis der Vaderlandsche Schilderkunst, her father had two paintings by Jan Both and Andries Both, and 4 fruit and flower still life paintings by Jan van Huijsum, 2 landscapes by Meindert Hobbema, 2 by Pieter de Hooch, 2 by Adrian van Ostade and 2 by Isaac van Ostade, 2 portraits by Rembrandt and 3 by Jan Steen, 2 by David Teniers and 2 by Adriaen van de Velde.

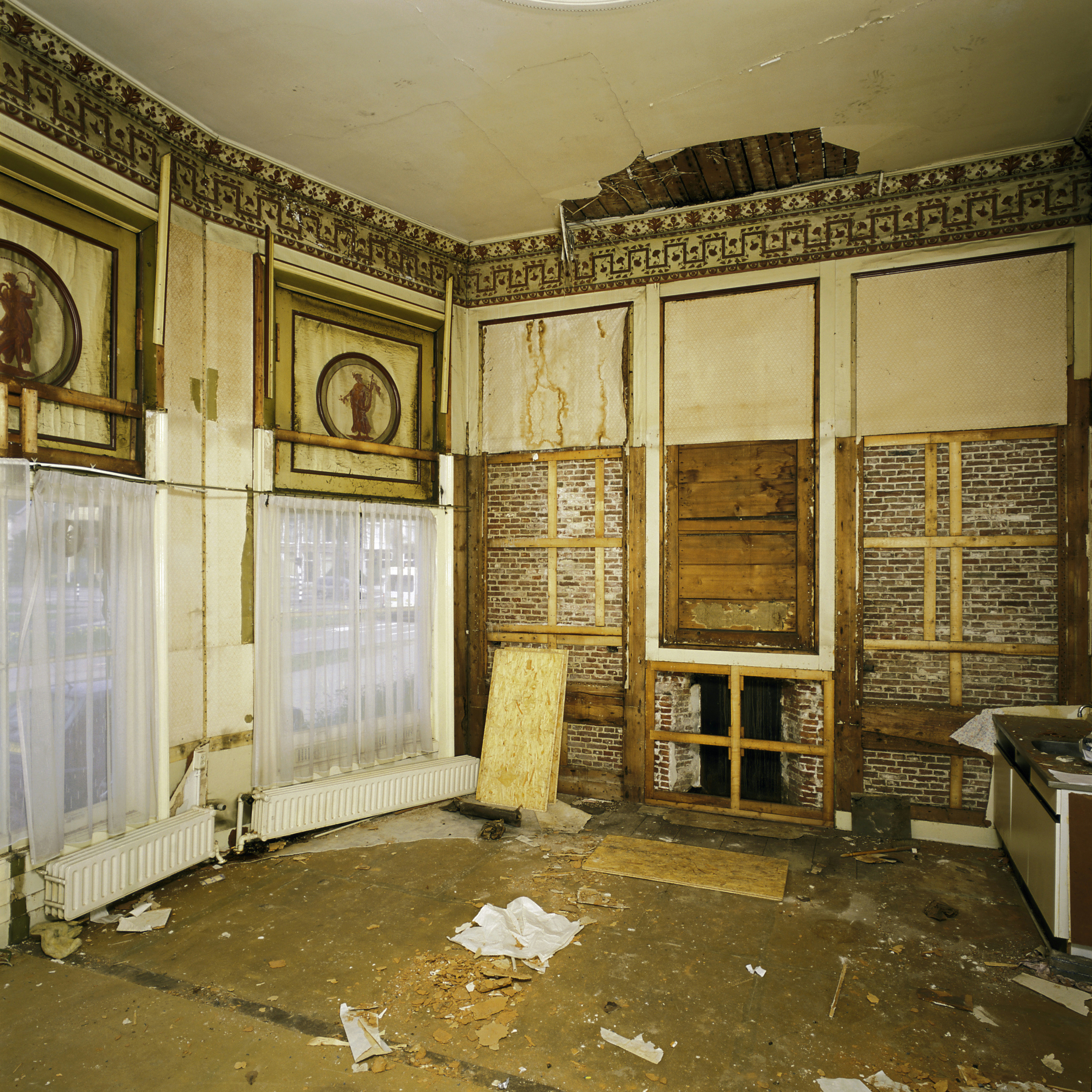
Recent inspection has revealed some of the pavilion's original decoration by Jan Kamphuijsen is still intact

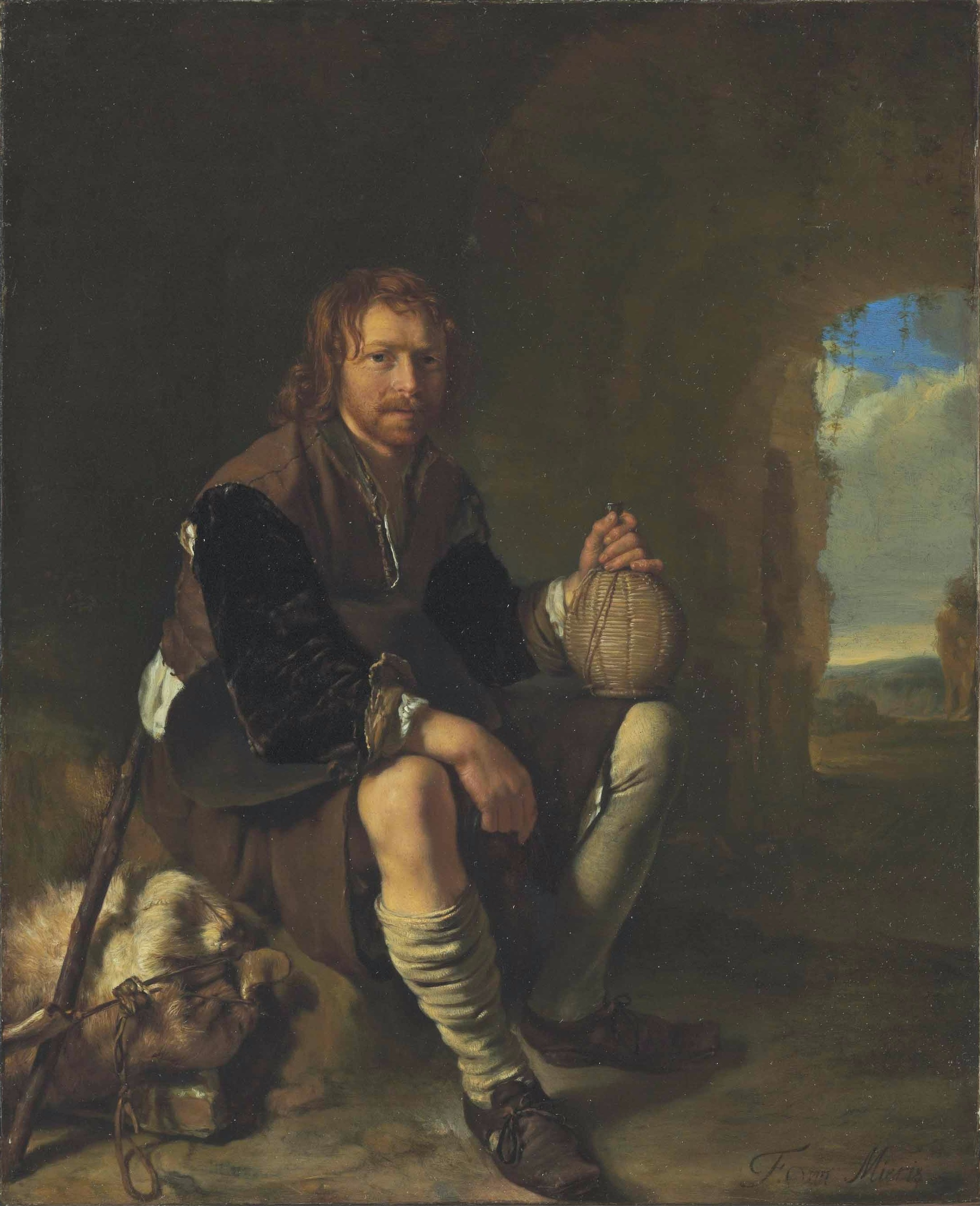
Resting traveller, by Frans van Mieris the Elder
