= Gabriel-François-Joseph de Verhulst =

Gabriel François Joseph van Verhulst
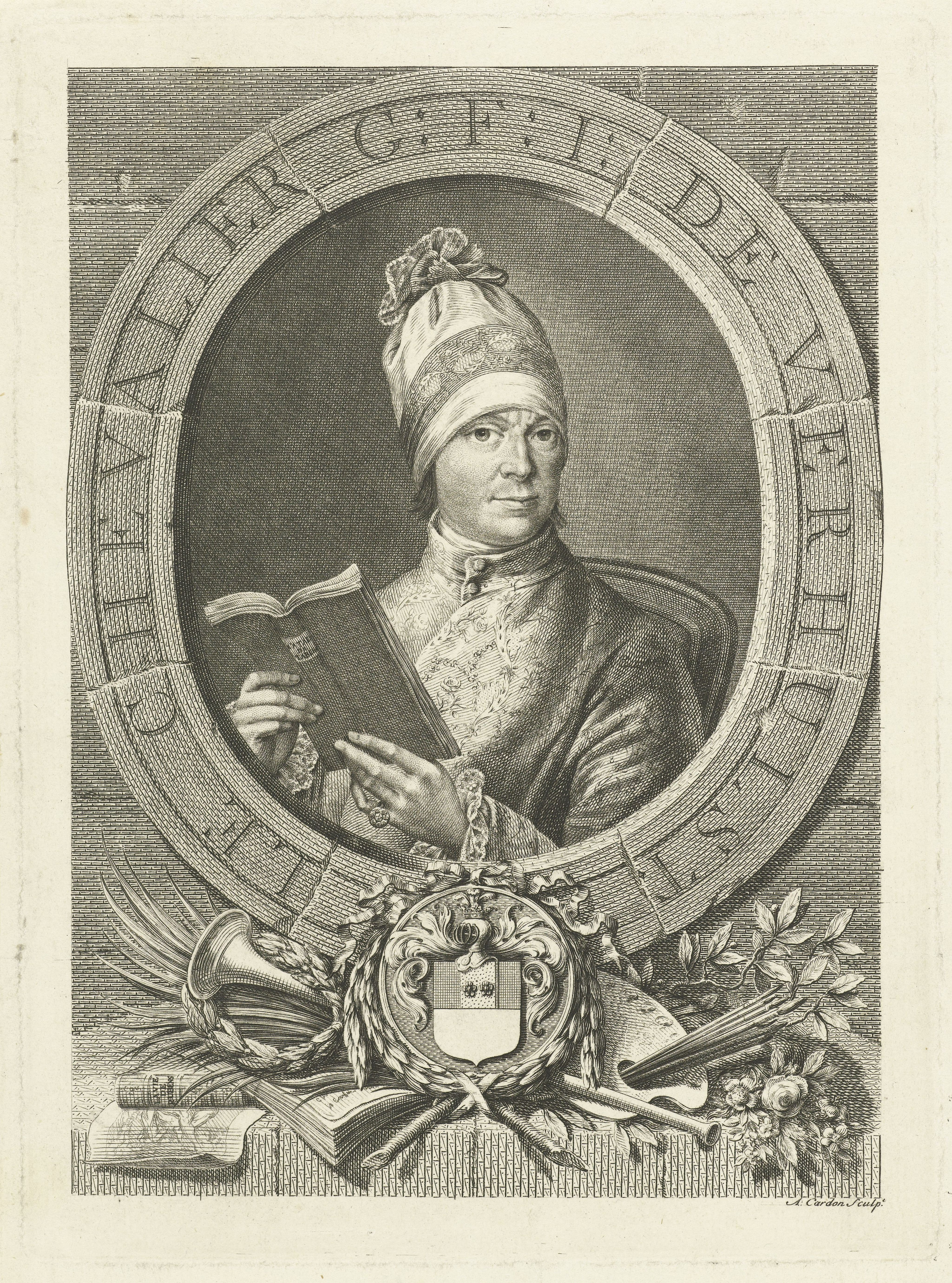
- engraved portrait by Antoine Cardon
- Died: circa 1779

Gabriel François Joseph van Verhulst ( ? – 1779) was a Brussels art collector whose collection was sold in Brussels in 1779.

Among the paintings sold were:

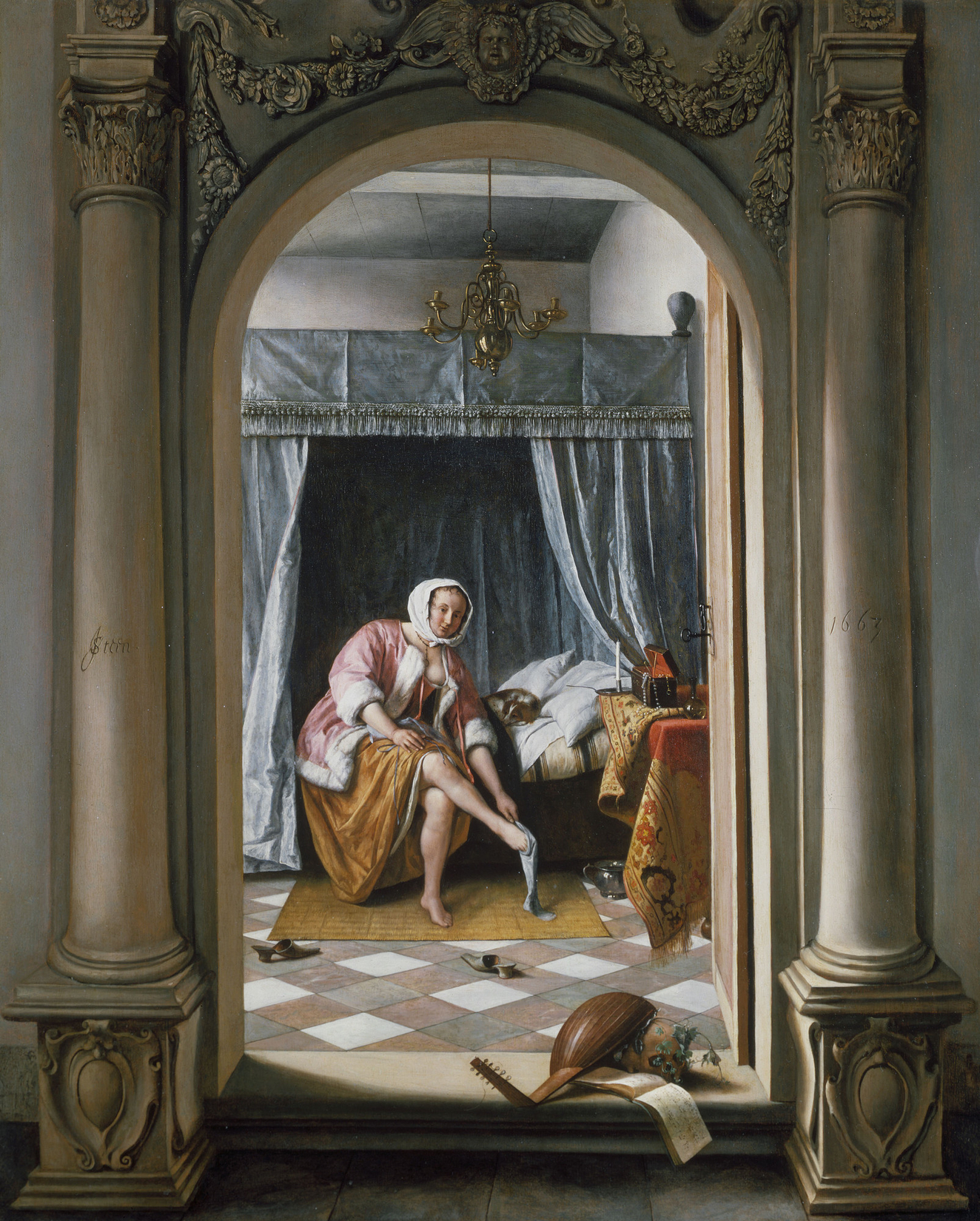
A Woman at her Toilet, by Jan Steen

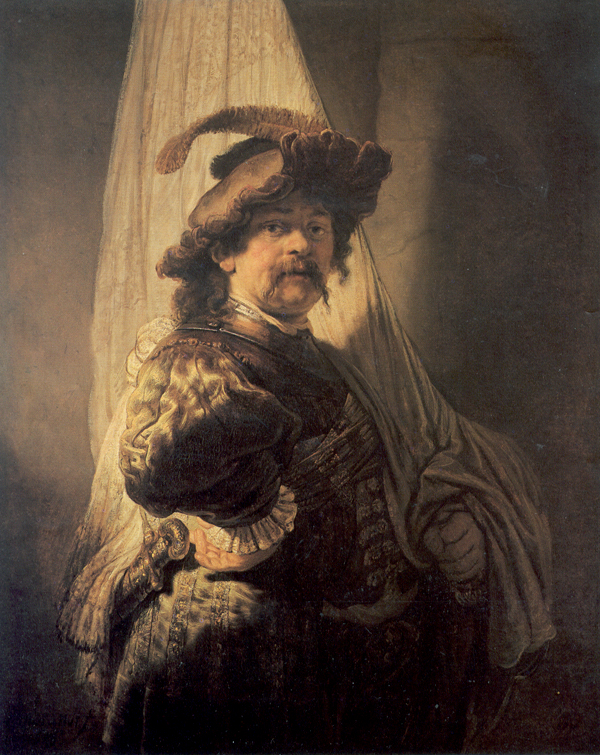
The Standard Bearer, by Rembrandt
