= A Woman with a Child in a Pantry =

Painting by Pieter de Hooch

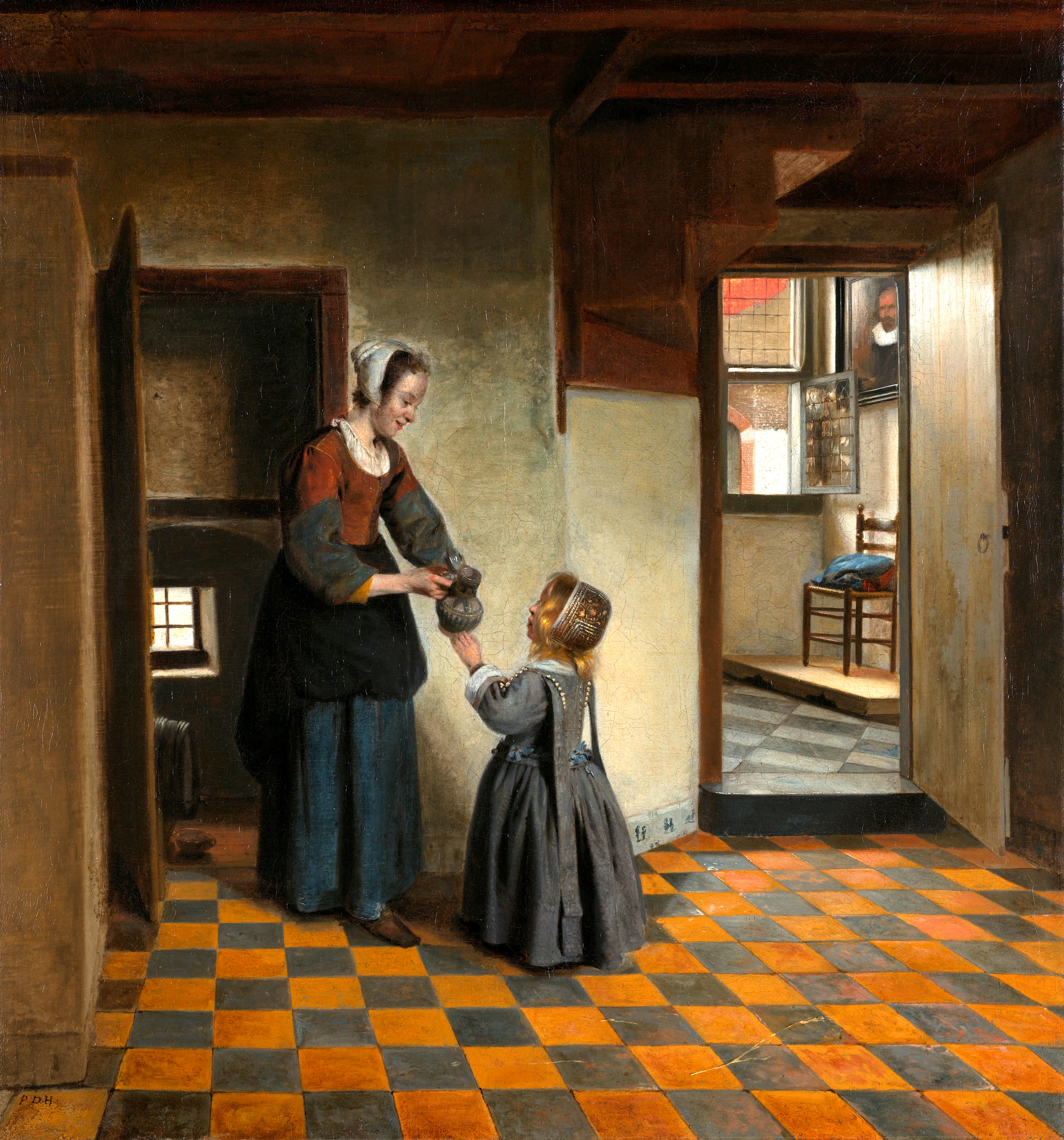
- Artist: Pieter de Hooch
- Year: c. 1658
- Medium: Oil on canvas
- Dimensions: 65 cm × 60.5 cm (26 in × 23.8 in)
- Location: Rijksmuseum; Amsterdam

A Woman with a Child in a Pantry is an oil-on-canvas painting by the Dutch Golden Age painter Pieter de Hooch, created c. 1658. It is part of the collection of the Rijksmuseum, in Amsterdam.

== Description ==
This was the first painting by Hooch documented by Hofstede de Groot in 1910, who wrote:

1. A YOUNG WOMAN AT A PANTRY-DOOR WITH A CHILD. Sm. 25; deG. 3. In a room floored with yellow tiles stands, to the left, a young woman, wearing a red jacket and a blue skirt. She has just come from the pantry, and smilingly hands a jug to a little girl. However the tailcoats on the dress would suggest this is a young boy, traditionally hidden from the devil by being disguised as a girl. Both figures are seen in profile. Traces of a picture painted over by the artist himself are faintly visible on the wall above the woman's head. The small window of the pantry and a cask are seen through an open door on the left. Through an open door on the right is a sitting-room; in this room a cushioned chair, with a portrait on the wall above it, stands by the open window. "An excellent work of the master" (Sm.).

Signed " P.D.H."; canvas, 27 inches by 23 inches. A good early copy is in the possession of the Rt. Hon. Sir A. Hayter, London. Sales:

- P. van der Lip, in Amsterdam, June 14, 1712 (Hoet, i. 147), No. 26 (66 florins); the pendant sold at this sale is now in the collection of Albert von Oppenheim at Cologne (6).
- Is. Walraven, in Amsterdam, October 14, 1765 (Terw. p. 504), No. 15 (450 florins, J. J. de Bruyn).
- J. J. de Bruyn, in Amsterdam, September 12, 1798, No. 25 (2600 florins, de Vos).
- P. de Smeth van Alphen, in Amsterdam, August i, 1810, No. 43 (3025 florins, Smit).
- The widow A. M. Hogguer, née Ebeling, in Amsterdam, August 18, 1817 (4010 florins).

Now in the Rijksmuseum at Amsterdam, No. 1248 in the 1903 catalogue (formerly numbered 682).

== See also ==
- List of paintings by Pieter de Hooch
