= Jacob Cats (painter) =

Dutch painter

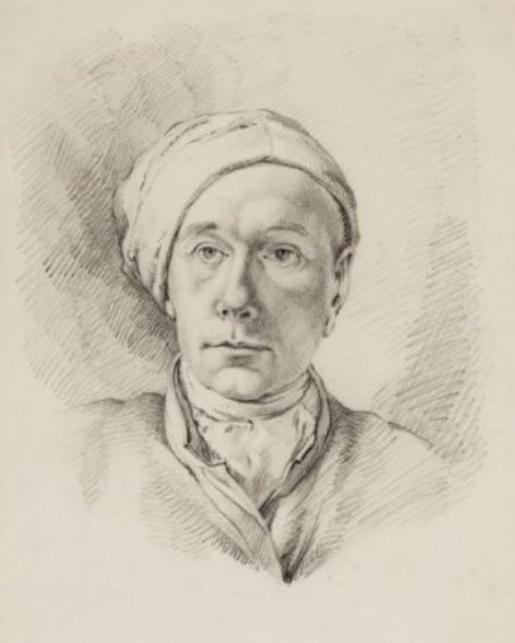
Jacob Cats portrait

Jacob Cats (1741–1799) was a Dutch draughtsman who also etched and painted.

He was born at Altona in 1741 as the son of a Mennonite bookseller who had to flee Amsterdam because of a controversial publication. The family returned to Amsterdam after a few years. He studied under Abraham Starre and Pieter Louw. Initially he worked for the wallpaintings firm of Troost van Groenendoelen. Later he established his own firm where he collaborated with i.a. Egbert van Drielst. As the market for wallpapers diminished, and his fame as a draughtsman rose, he started to focus uniquely on the latter. He was celebrated for drawing townscapes and landscapes with realistically rendered persons and animals, his works having a distinct originality and being marked by a poetical rendering of the features of nature, as well as by careful manipulation. He also created a good feeling of depth in his work. They are often suggestive of seventeenth-century artists such as Adriaan van de Velde and Berchem, and are highly valued. He also copied some paintings on a smaller scale, and has left some etchings. He died at Amsterdam in 1799.

His work is represented in nearly all major public collections in the Netherlands, such as the Rijksmuseum, Amsterdam Museum, Teylers Museum and the Amsterdam town Archives stadsarchief Amsterdam. Drawings of his are also in the collections of e.g. The British Museum, The Courtauld, Louvre, Metropolitan Museum of Art and Morgan Library & Museum.
