= François-Antoine Robit =

- Born: 1752
- Died: August 29, 1815; Paris

François-Antoine Robit or Citoyen Robit (1752 – August 29, 1815) was a French art collector whose collection was sold during the Napoleonic period in Paris in 1801.

Michael Bryan had obtained funds from Sir Simon Clarke and George Hibbert to purchase 51 paintings from the Robit collection sale which he exhibited in his gallery on Savile Row in November 1801. In fact, he brought about 80 items from the Robit sale that were later acquired by Hibbert and Clarke.

Among the paintings were:

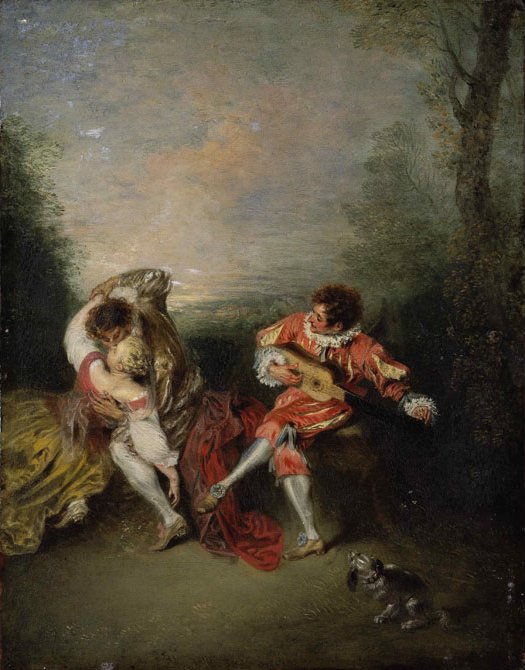
La Surprise by Watteau

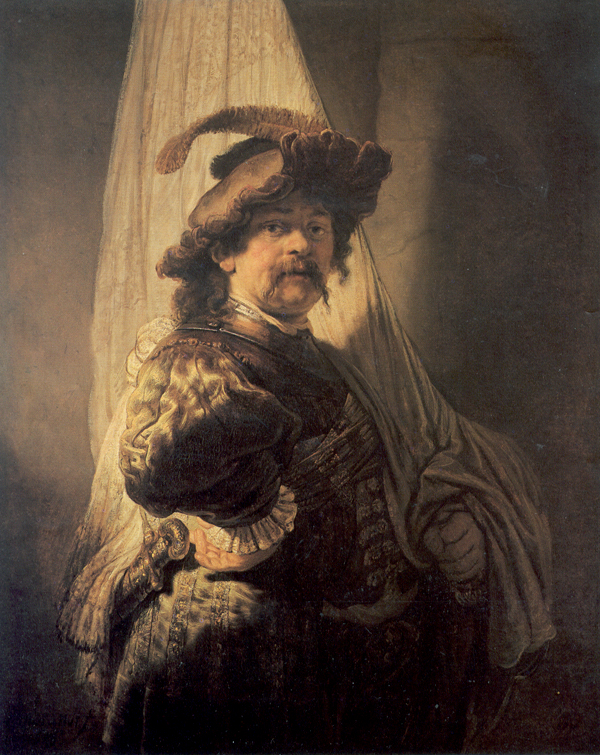
The Standard Bearer by Rembrandt
