= Johann Peter Pichler =

Austrian engraver

- Born: 13 May 1765; Bozen
- Died: 18 March 1807 (aged 41); Vienna

Johann Peter Pichler (13 May 1765 – 18 March 1807) was an Austrian engraver known for his mezzotints after old masters.

Pichler was born in Bozen (Bolzano) and was a pupil of Jacob Matthias Schmutzer (1733–1811) and Johann Jacobé (1733–1797), whose daughter he married. He is known for works after paintings for the noble courts of Vienna and Dresden. He is sometimes mentioned as a relative of Anton Pichler, who was also born near Bozen, but no known relationship has been established.

== Gallery ==
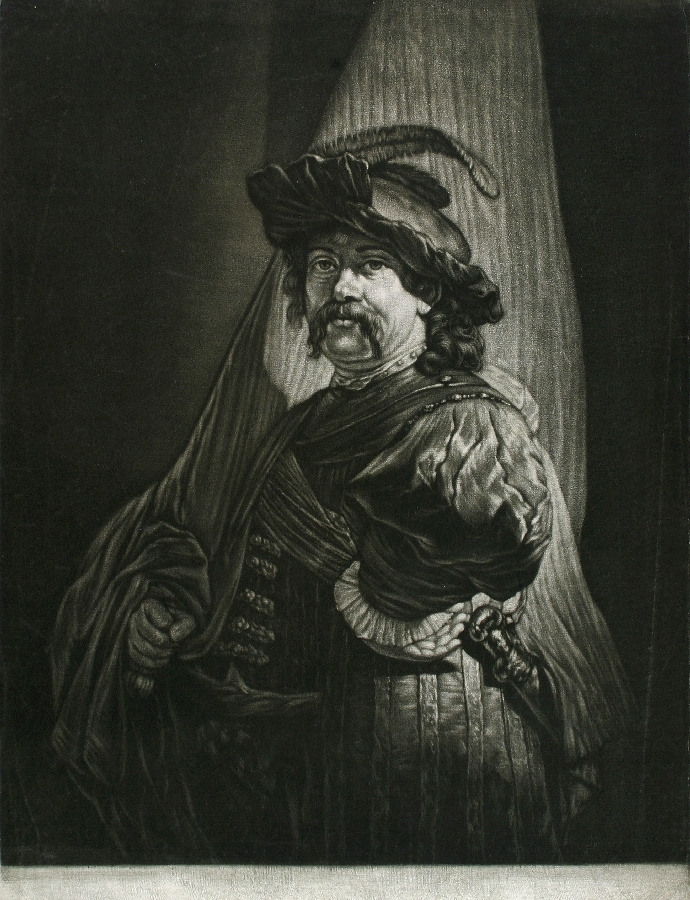
Mezzotint after Rembrandt, 1791

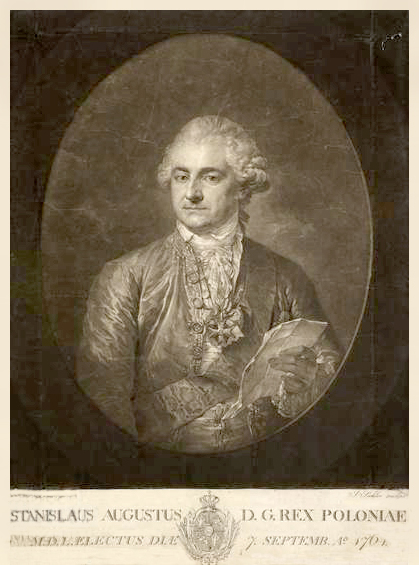
Stanisław August Poniatowski

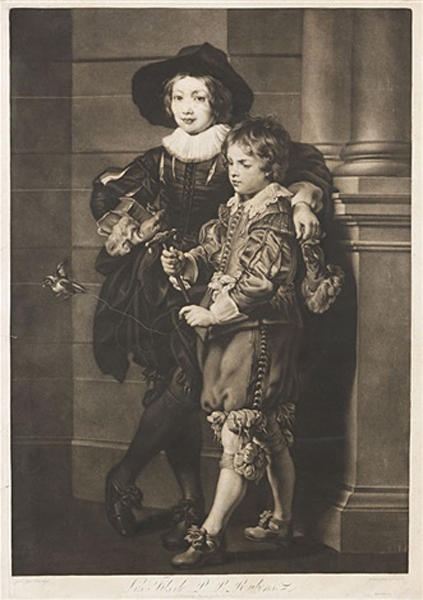
Mezzotint of Albert and Nicolaas Rubens after Rubens
