= Michael Bryan (art historian) =

English art historian (1757–1821)

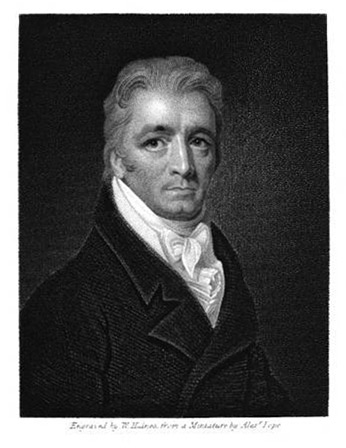
Portrait of Michael Bryan (Engraved by William Haines after Alexander Pope)

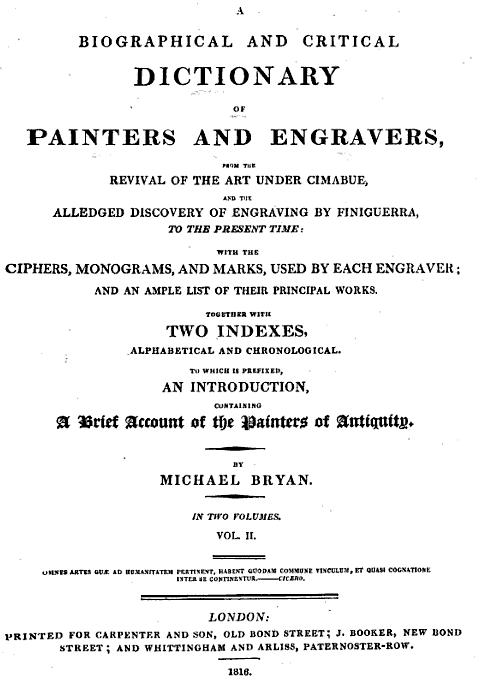
Biographical and Critical Dictionary of Painters and Engravers, Volume II, 1816

Michael Bryan (9 April 1757 – 21 March 1821) was an English art historian, art dealer and connoisseur. He was involved in the purchase and resale of the great French Orleans Collection of art, selling it on to a British syndicate, and owned a fashionable art gallery in Savile Row, London. His book, Biographical and Critical Dictionary of Painters and Engravers, first published in 1813–1816, was a standard reference work (revised, and often under variant titles) throughout the 19th century, and was last republished in 1920; however it is now badly outdated.

== Life and work ==
Bryan was born in Newcastle upon Tyne, Northumberland (now Tyne and Wear), and educated at the Royal Grammar School under Dr. Moyce. He travelled to London in 1781, then to Flanders with his eldest brother, where he lived from 1782 to 1790, possibly having some connection with the cloth trade, but also building up his art historical knowledge. In June 1784, he married Juliana Talbot (1759–1801), the sister of Charles Talbot, the 15th Earl of Shrewsbury, which gained him valuable aristocratic social connections.

Bryan moved back to London in 1790 establishing himself as an authority and dealer in Fine Art. In 1793 or 1794, he again went to the continent in search of fine pictures. Among other places he visited Holland, and remained there until an order arrived from the French government to stop all English citizens then resident there. He was, amongst many others, detained at Rotterdam. It was here that he met François Laborde de Méreville who, in 1798, sought his advice and assistance in disposing of the Italian part of the famous private "Orleans Collection" of art which he had acquired. Bryan, in effect, became a middleman for the purchase, and contacted the Duke of Bridgewater, who authorised him to open negotiations. After three weeks, a syndicate consisting of the Duke of Bridgewater, Marquis of Stafford, then Lord Gower, and the Earl of Carlisle, became the purchasers of the collection from Bryan, at a price of £43,500. The collection was displayed in Bryan's private art gallery in Pall Mall, London, as well as at The Lyceum in the Strand.

In 1801 Bryan obtained, through the Duke of Bridgewater, the king's permission to visit Paris in order to purchase art from the cabinet of Monsieur Robit to bring back to England. Among other fine pictures, he returned with two by the baroque Spanish artist Murillo - "The infant Christ as the Good Shepherd", and "The infant St. John with the lamb".

In 1804 Bryan retired from the art world, and settled at his brother's home in Yorkshire, where he remained until 1811. In 1812 Bryan again visited London, and commenced writing his "magnum opus" - the Biographical and Critical Dictionary of Painters and Engravers in 2 volumes. The first part appeared in May 1813, and concluded in 1816. He owned a gallery in London's Savile Row, which became a fashionable gathering place for artists and their patrons. In 1818 he became involved with some speculative art purchases which proved a failure.

On 14 February 1821, Bryan suffered a severe paralytic stroke, dying at Portman Square, London on 21 March of the same year.

== Bibliography ==
- Bryan's dictionary of painters and engravers ( London (George Bell & Sons), Cambridge (Deighton, Bell & Co), New York (The Macmillan Co) and Bombay (A. H. Wheeler & Co) Edition of 1903 - 1905:

Volume 1 (A to C) 1903
Volume 2 (D to G)
Volume 3 (H to M)
Volume 4 (N to R)
Volume 5 (S to Z) 1905
