= Nikolay Semyonovich Mosolov =

Nikolay Mosolov
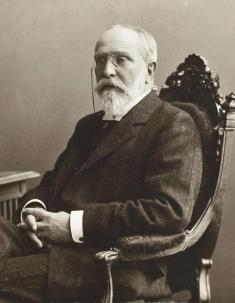
- Born: 1845
- Died: 1914 (aged 68–69); Moscow

Nikolay Semyonovich Mosolov (Russian: Никола́й Семёнович Мосоло́в; 1845–1914), also gallicised as N. Massaloff, was a Russian draughtsman and printmaker during the Belle Époque, active in Moscow, known for his etchings after the Old Masters.

He was the son of the etcher and print collector Semyon Nicolaevitch Mosolov and studied under Fyodor Iordan at the Imperial Academy of Arts in St. Petersburg. He completed his education in Dresden and Paris, where he worked in the studio of Léopold Flameng as an illustrator and won his first gold medal for his etchings. In 1872 he published in French his etchings from paintings of the Hermitage in Vienna, signing as N. Massaloff. He donated his collection of paintings and prints to the Rumyantsev Museum.

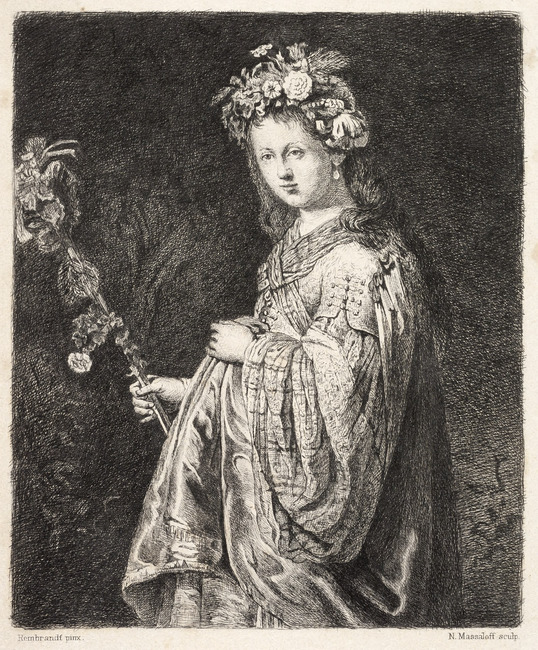
Flora, after Rembrandt, 1872

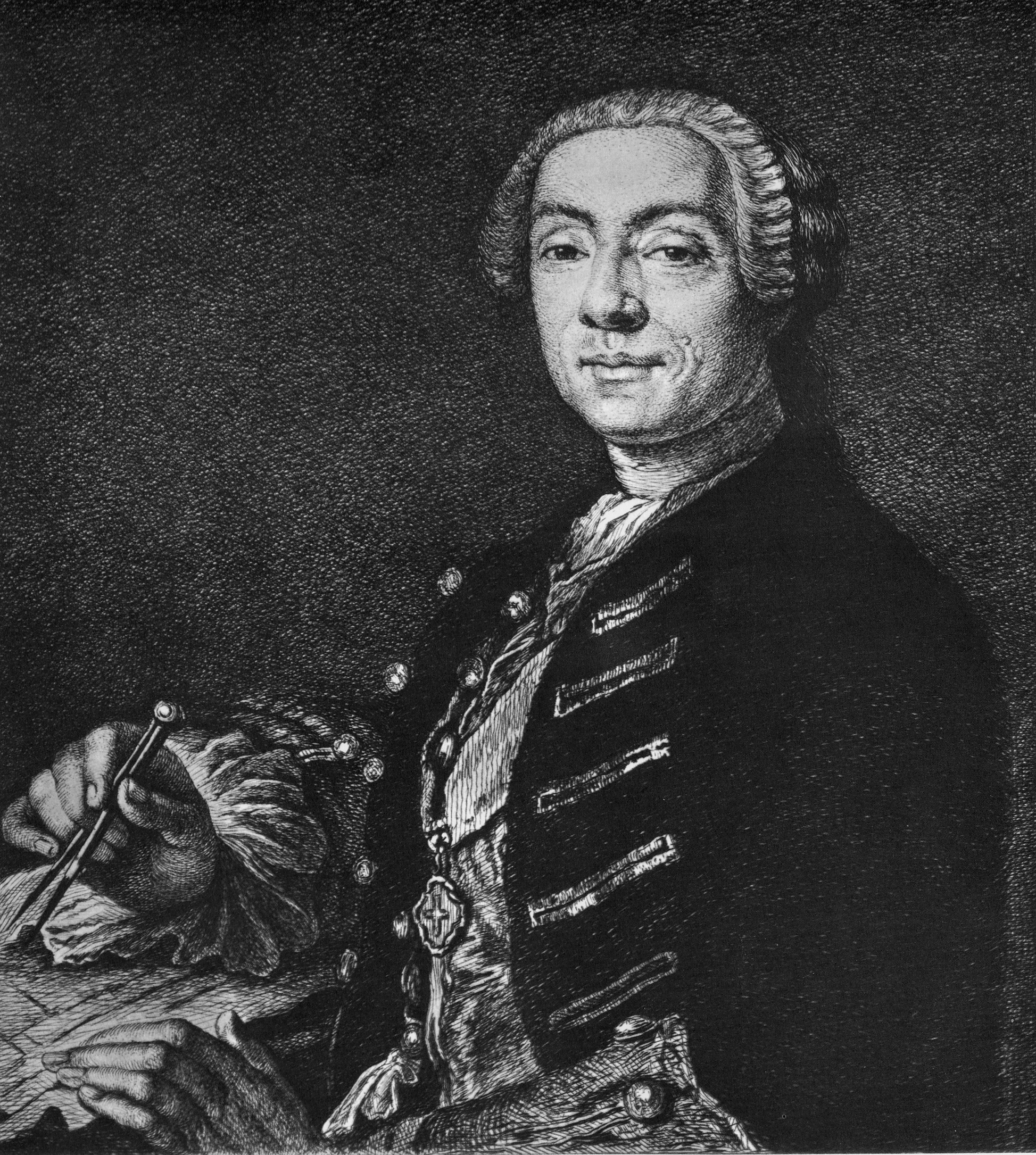
Ferdinando Fuga (formerly believed to be Francesco Bartolomeo Rastrelli), 1870

Portrait of a Man, the supposed portrayal of Andries de Graeff, after Rembrandt
