= Pieter Louw =

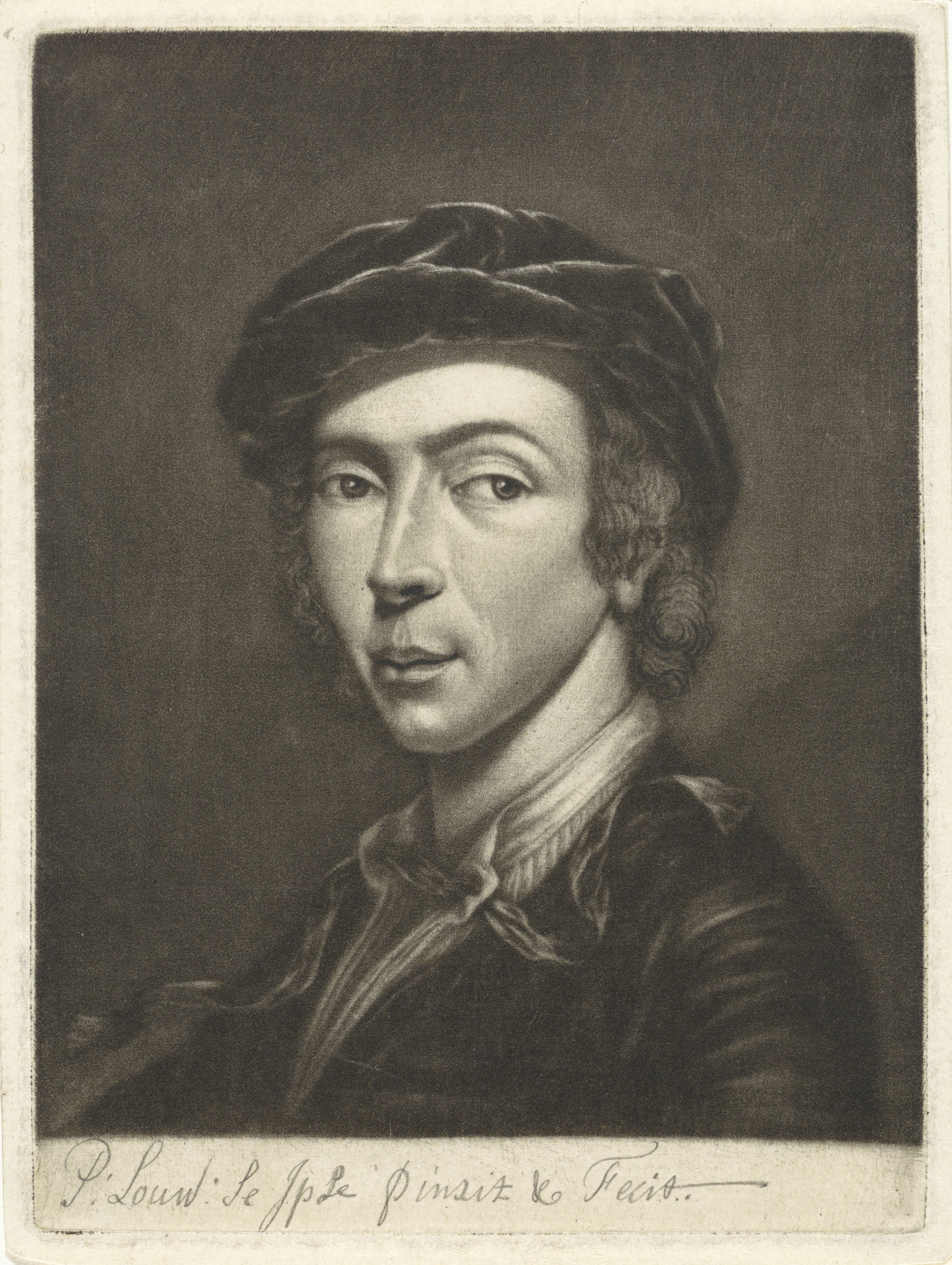
- Self-portrait
- Born: 1725; Amsterdam
- Died: 1800 (aged 74–75); Amsterdam

Pieter Louw (1725 – 1800) was a Dutch painter-engraver best known for his mezzotint copies of old masters.

Louw was born in Amsterdam and worked with Caspar Jacobsz Philips. He later became a teacher and pupils were Jacob Cats, Anna Maria Ebeling, Johan George Kreetschmer, Daniël Veelwaard (I), and Izaak Jansz. de Wit.

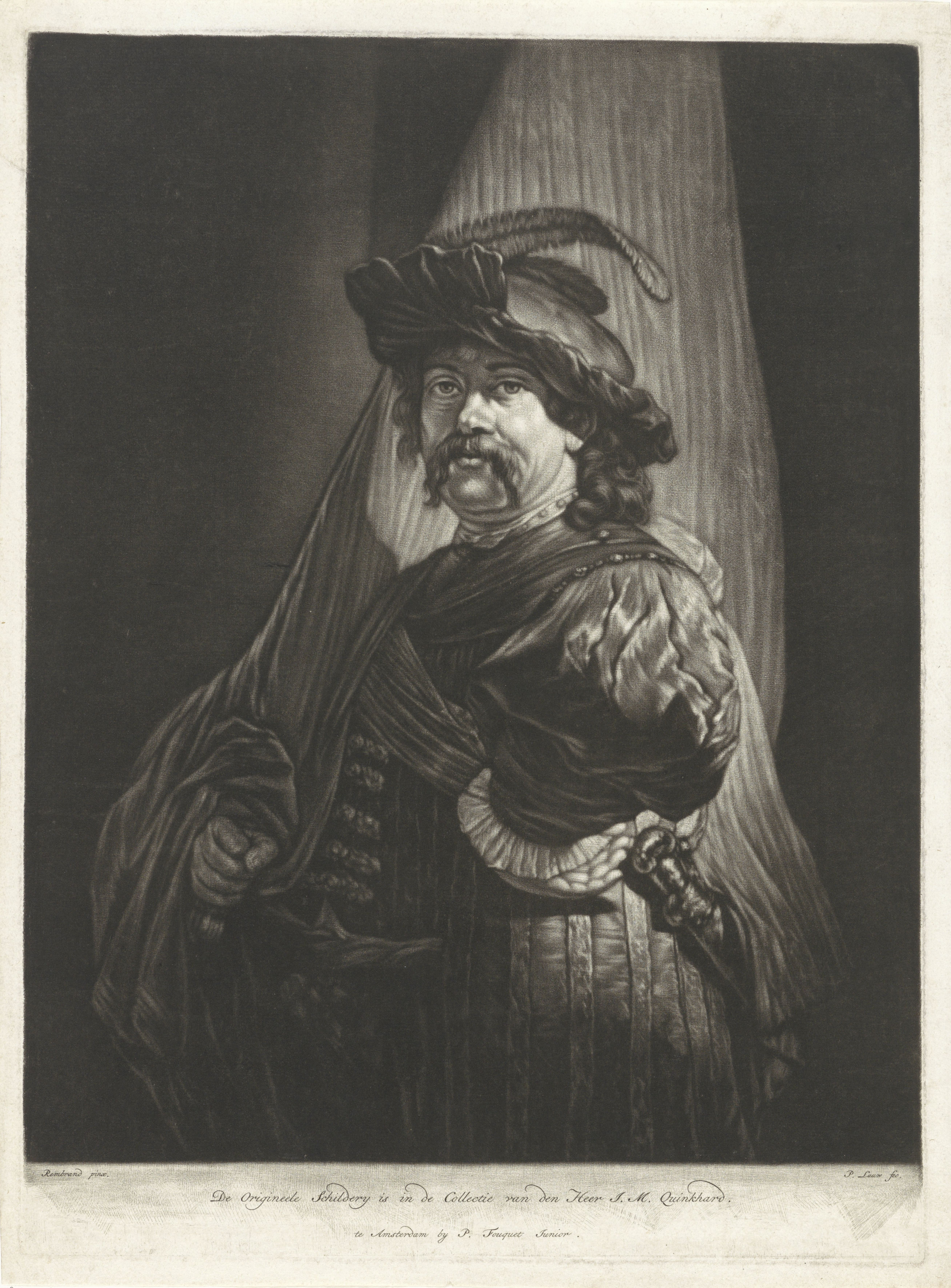
Flag bearer after Rembrandt

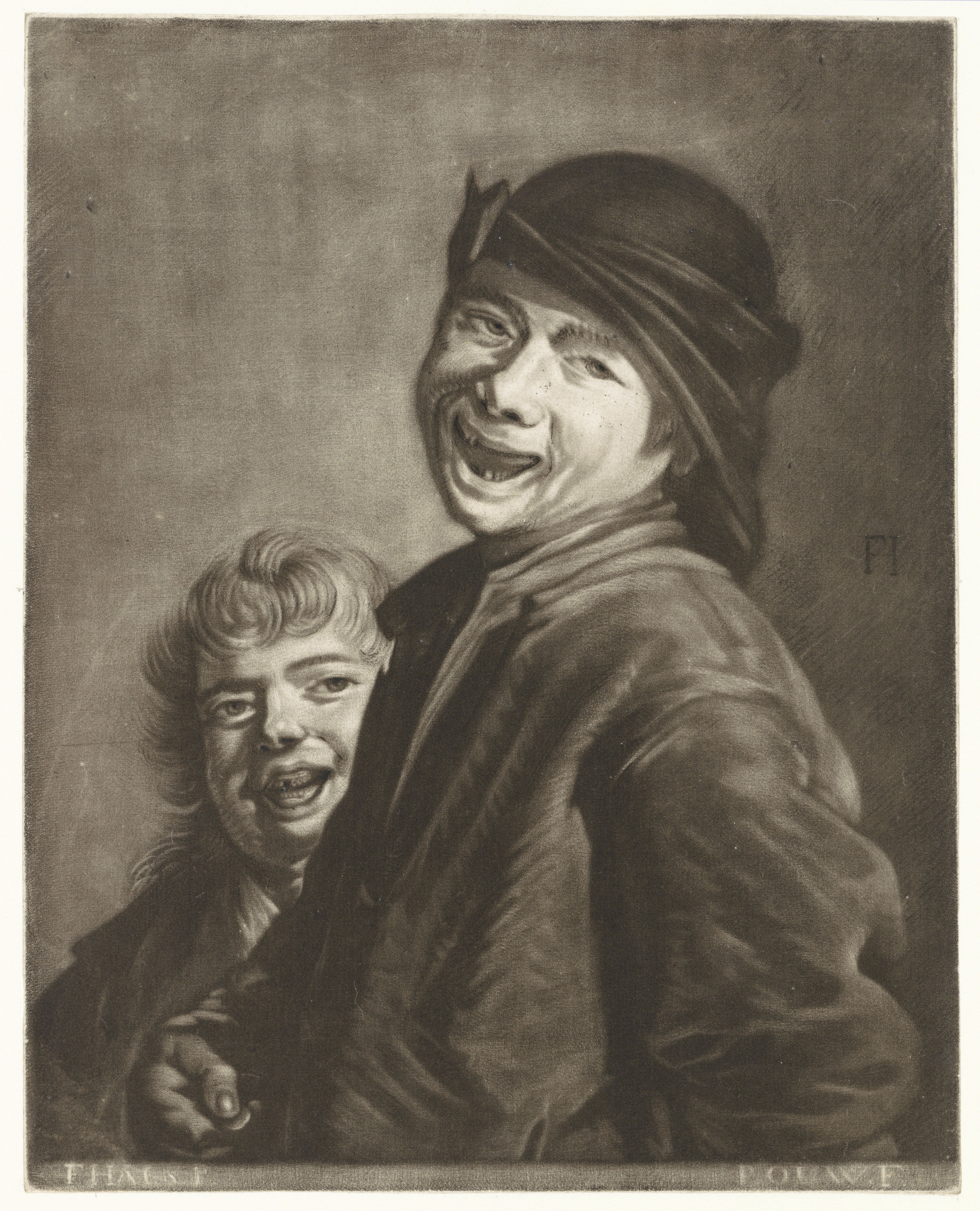
Two laughing boys after Frans Hals

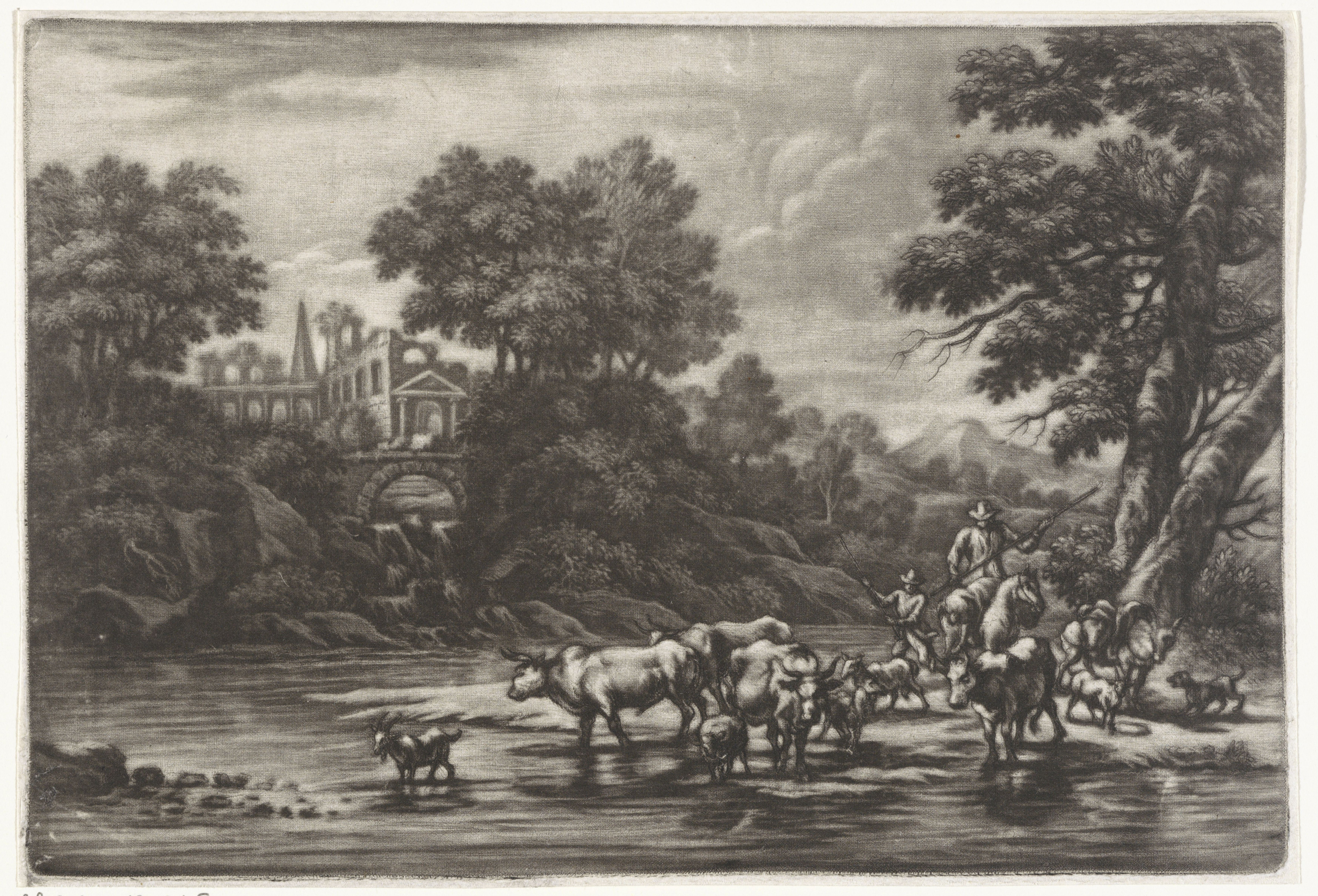
River landscape with herdsmen

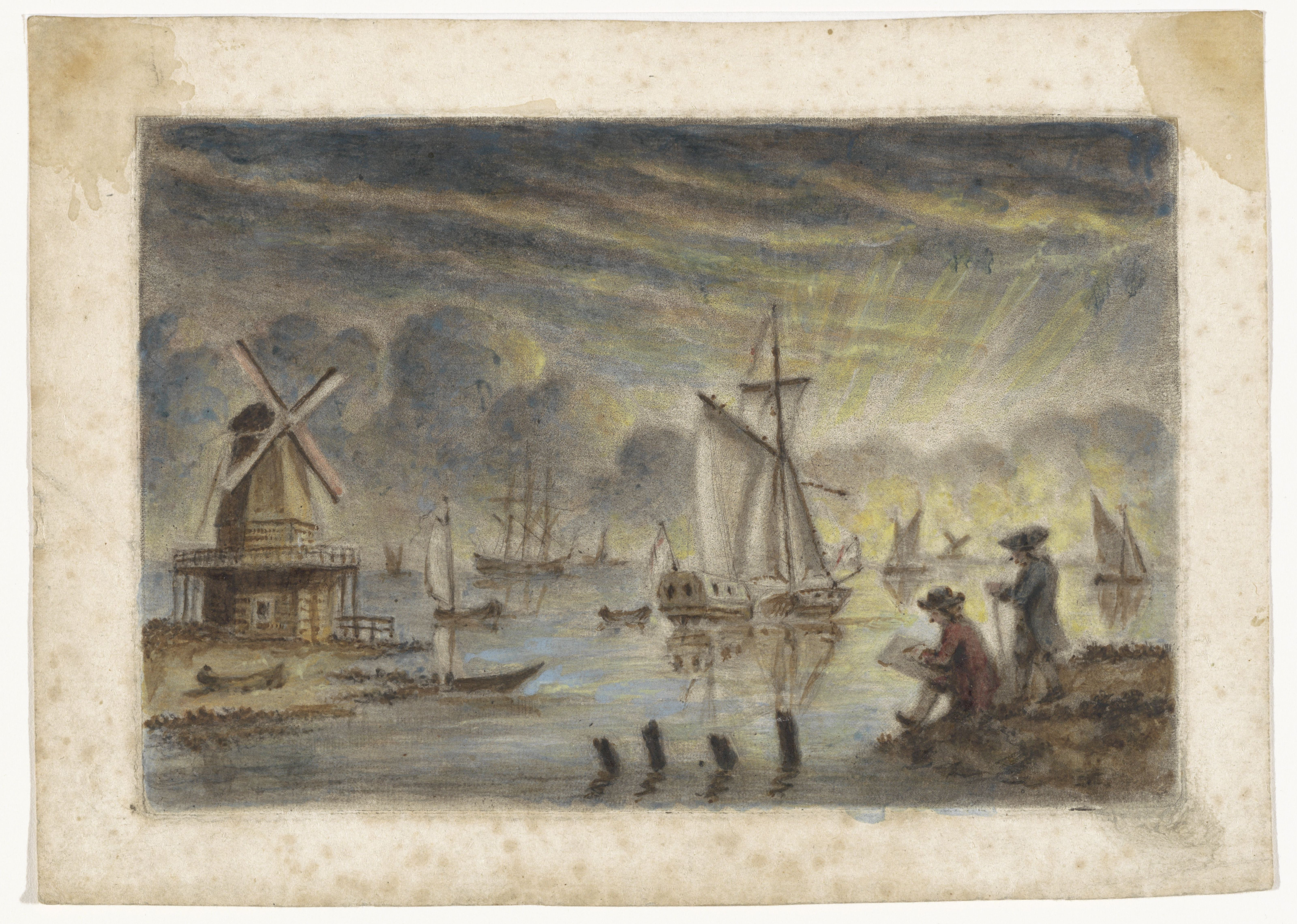
An artist sketching on a riverbank
