= Johann Gottfried Haid =

German engraver

- Born: 1710; Augsburg
- Died: 1776; Vienna

Johann Gottfried Haid (1710 – 1776) was a German engraver known for his mezzotint copies of old masters. His nephew, Johann Elias Haid also became an engraver and took over the family publishing house called "J.J. Haid & Sohn".

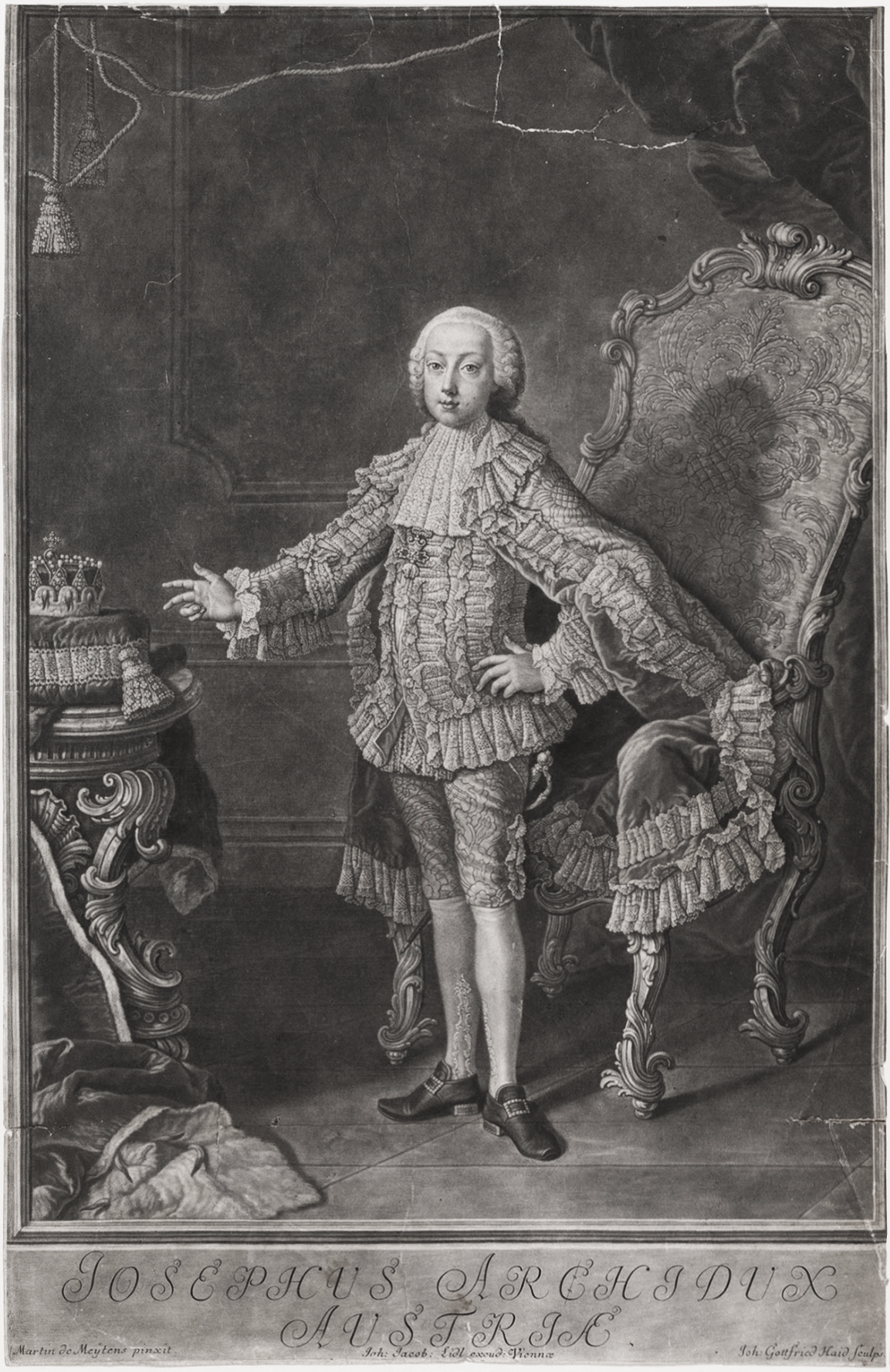
A mezzotint of Joseph II, Holy Roman Emperor after Meytens

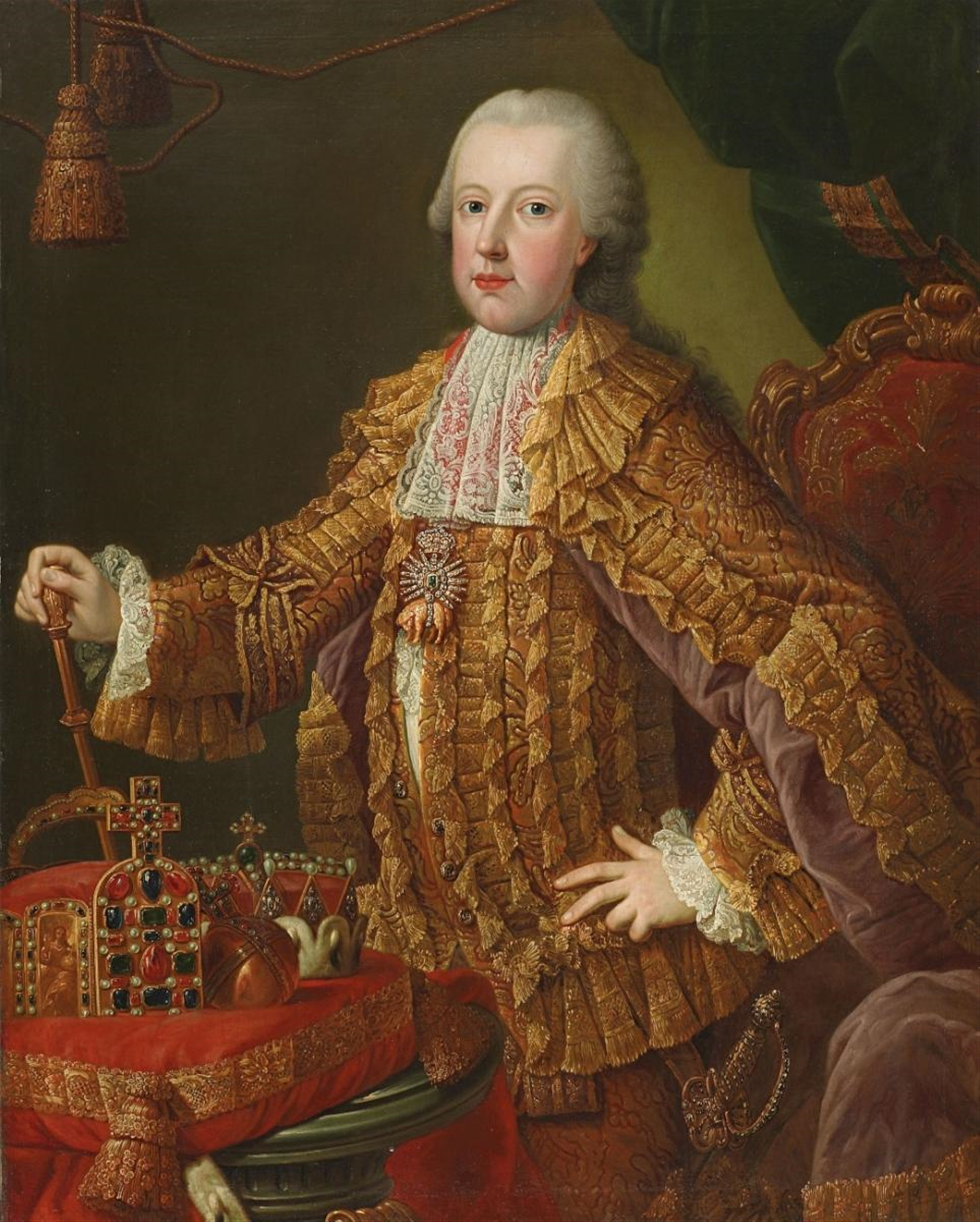
Circle of Martin van Meytens after the same original work
