= Jan Kamphuysen =

Dutch painter

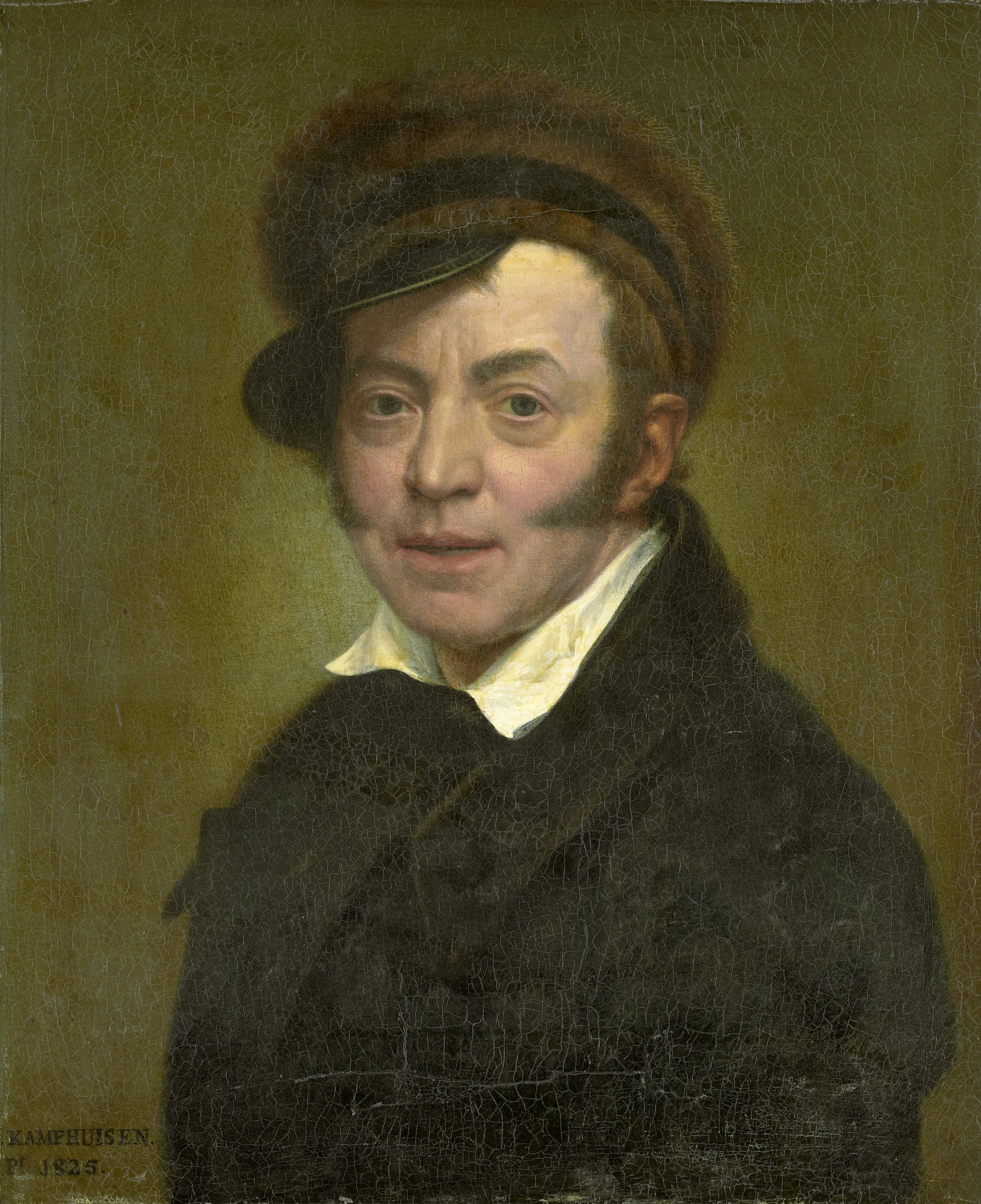
- self portrait
- Born: 1760; Amsterdam
- Died: 1841; Amsterdam

Jan Kamphuysen, Camphuysen, or Kamphuijsen (1760–1841) was a painter from the Netherlands.

He was born in Amsterdam where he became a pupil of the theatre decorator Pieter Barbiers. Like his teacher, he is known for his interior decorations as well as landscapes and historical allegories.

Kamphuysen died in Amsterdam.
