= The Effects of Intemperance =

Painting by the Dutch painter Jan Steen

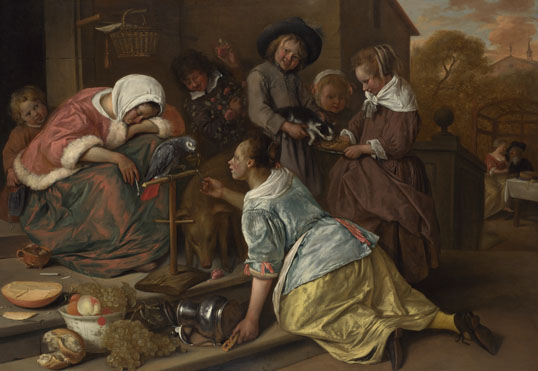
- Artist: Jan Steen
- Year: 1662
- Medium: Oil on wood
- Dimensions: 76 cm × 106.5 cm (30 in × 41.9 in)
- Location: The National Gallery, London

The Effects of Intemperance is an oil-on-panel painting executed c.1663–1665 by the Dutch artist Jan Steen. It was bought by the National Gallery, London in 1977 and is still in its collection.

The work depicts an issue which Steen addressed several times, that of the unfortunate consequences of excessive drinking. As keeper of a tavern himself he was well acquainted with the problem but chose to portray it in a light-hearted manner. In this case a wife and mother has fallen into a drunken sleep and the rest of the family has taken advantage of the fact to misbehave. One is trying to persuade the parrot to drink wine, others are giving their food to the cat and roses to the pig, a young boy is trying to steal from his mother's purse and the woman's husband is in the garden engaged in a dalliance with the maid.

Several of these themes can also be found in Steen's 1663 painting Beware of Luxury, which also portrays an out-of-control household.

== Sources ==
- https://www.nationalgallery.org.uk/paintings/jan-steen-the-effects-of-intemperance
