= Beware of Luxury =

Painting by the Dutch painter Jan Steen

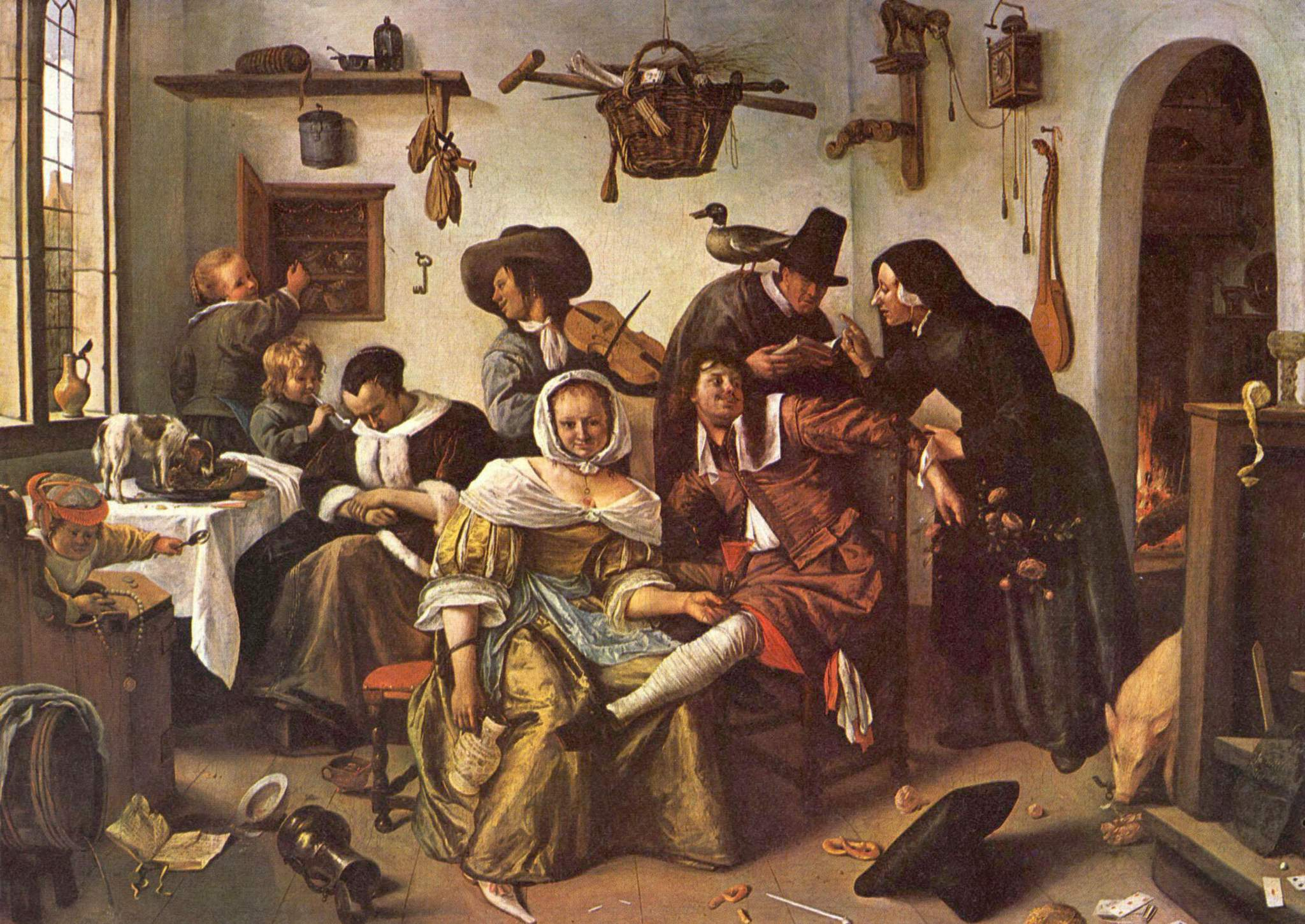
- Artist: Jan Steen
- Year: 1663
- Medium: Oil on canvas
- Dimensions: 105 cm × 145.5 cm (41 in × 57.3 in)
- Location: Kunsthistorisches Museum Wien, Vienna
- Accession: GG_791

Beware of Luxury (in Dutch, In weelde siet toe) also known as Die verkehrte Welt (The Upside-Down World), is a 1663 oil painting by the Dutch painter Jan Steen, now in the Kunsthistorisches Museum in Vienna.

The painting depicts a disorderly household given over to licentious or improper behavior. The rowdy merrymakers are arranged in an inverted triangle formation. At its center, a young woman—modeled by Steen's wife, Margriet van Goyen—flirts with the man of the house, smiling flirtatiously at the viewer.

Jan Steen's picture is a comedic distortion of a Dutch family home, and it serves as a warning to viewers of the foolishness and repercussions of living in disorder. As a genre painter who specialized in satirical scenes, Steen painted many works with similar themes, including As the Old Sing, So Pipe the Young and The Effects of Intemperance.

== Description ==
Beware of Luxury is an oil-on-canvas work, measuring 105 x 145.5 cm. It is a satirical depiction of a middle-class Dutch family indulging in excess, with a moral message about the virtues of moderation. The painting is a humorous illustration of a Dutch saying: In Weelde Siet Toe, which appears on a slate in the bottom left corner. In full, the proverb translates as "Beware of luxury" or "In good times, beware the consequences."

In this painting, the lady of the house has fallen asleep, perhaps due to drunkenness, allowing the household to run wild. Her husband in the foreground is carrying on a dalliance with another young woman, who is holding a glass of red wine between his legs. He is laughing off the admonitions of a nun or beguine. A man plays the violin while a distressed Quaker man consults his Bible. One child reaches into the cabinet of glassware, while her younger brother blows on a tobacco pipe. The youngest child is playing with a string of pearls and a silver spoon.

Around the family and their guests, the home is hopelessly disorganized. Food, dishware, and playing cards are scattered over the floor; a wine barrel in the corner is leaking, as a pig has made off with the spigot. Elsewhere, a duck sits on one man's shoulder, and a monkey holds a string attached to a clock. On the table, a dog laps up the pie. Suspended over the scene, a basket of tools and weapons dangles hazardously.

=== Symbolism ===
Like other works by Steen, Beware of Luxury invites the viewer to reflect on the virtues of temperance and the dangers of household disorder. The dog stealing meat from the table is a symbol of greed and excess, and the playing cards scattered across the floor indicate the sin of gambling. The woman's wine over the man's crotch references their sin of erotic desire. The two Quakers in the back may represent a biblical warning to the other members of the painting.

In the hanging basket, bad omens threaten to fall on the household, including a crutch, a sword, and a set of clappers that would signal illness like leprosy. The playing card, more prominent in Steen's similar painting The Dissolute Household (ca. 1663-1664) may be the unlucky jack of spades. The moral of the work is clear: sinners must expect penalty.

Another saying is brought to mind by the pig nuzzling the rose. The phrase "throwing roses before swine" is a Biblical expression referring to wasteful or useless acts. The monkey stopping the clock reminds us of the saying, "Time is forgotten in folly." A "quacking" duck represents incoherent chatter. The duck on the man's shoulder most likely relates to his talk being pointless banter in which they have decided to ignore the mayhem around them.

The lemon, half-unpeeled, was a very common symbol in Dutch paintings. In part, it may represent the republic's trade victories over Spain, while the sweet appearance of a sour lemon also contributes to the painting's theme of temptation.

== Interpretation ==
Jan Steen was known for his humorous and satirical paintings of "dissolute households", which often mocked the excesses of the rising Dutch bourgeoisie. In the 17th century, trade created economic prosperity and class mobility in the Dutch Republic. Many middle-class families suddenly accrued new wealth; some purchased aristocratic titles and rose up the social ranks, while others became successful urban burghers. Household portraits, to show off a family's new luxuries and power, were commonplace. Steen himself painted several portraits of these nouveau riche, perhaps providing inspiration for his satire. He deliberately inverted the tropes of painters like Pieter de Hooch, twisting familial scenes into warnings against the effects of intemperance.

For Dutch group portraiture, class would have been immediately indicated to the viewer by dress and activity. Middle-class people wanted to be painted as moral hard-workers, while the new aristocrats would be portrayed in acts of luxury like talking or playing music. In Beware of Luxury, the modest house and plain clothing of its inhabitants indicate this is a middle-class family. Yet the adults talk and strum instruments, while children play with pearls and glassware, activities that symbolize the leisure of an aristocratic family. By including contrasting symbols of different classes, Jan Steen may be mocking burghers who gain a little wealth and abandon their moral work. His subjects, indulging in good times and small riches, ignore their impending doom.

At the same time, however, the painting also carries a moral message about the dangers of excess and the virtues of moderation. The figures are shown engaged in various forms of excess and indulgence, from drinking and eating to playing music and reading frivolous books. Meanwhile, the objects suspended above them, and the warning in the corner, tell the viewer to judge the contents as a cautionary tale. This framework, which seems to praise a vice but includes a hidden message of truth, is known as an ironic eulogy. Ironic eulogies were a popular rhetorical method for many writers, and painters, throughout early Modern Europe.

Steen used himself and his family as models for many of his comic portraits. His own comic persona drinks, blows bagpipes, and carouses irreverently. Although some viewers might not have recognized the artist, many painting sales at that time were conducted face-to-face, so the artist's face in these farcical scenes would have been part of the joke. Later biographers often mistook Steen's fictional self-portraits for accurate portrayals of his life, leading to a common perception of Steen as a drunken ne'er-do-well. In this painting, Steen is the grinning man in the brown jacket. The woman in the center is his first wife, Margriet van Goyen. According to one biographer, she disliked that Steen often portrayed her as a "loose woman", though she willingly modeled for many such portraits during her lifetime.

== Other version ==
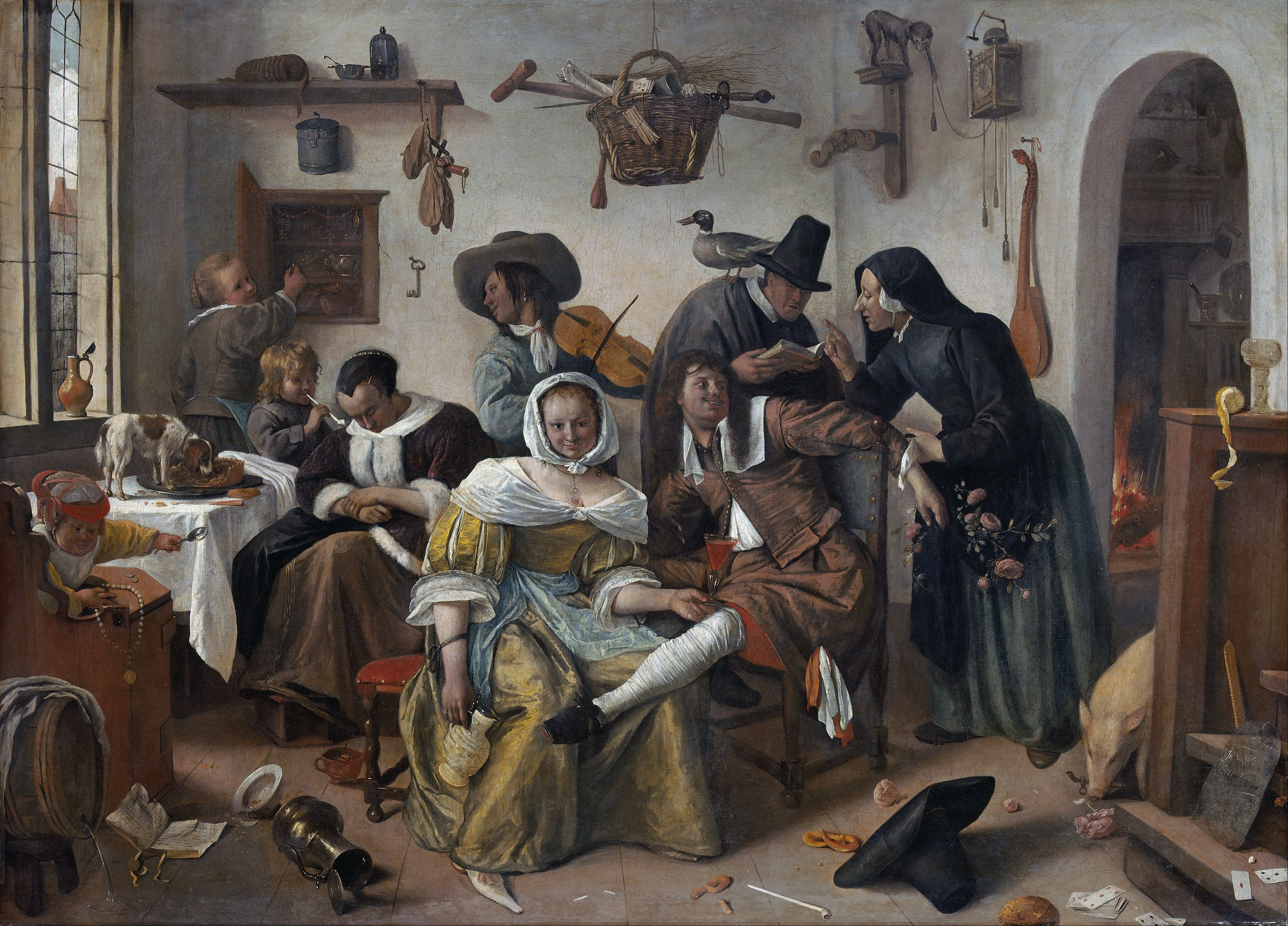
Jan Steen - Beware of Luxury (“In Weelde Siet Toe”)

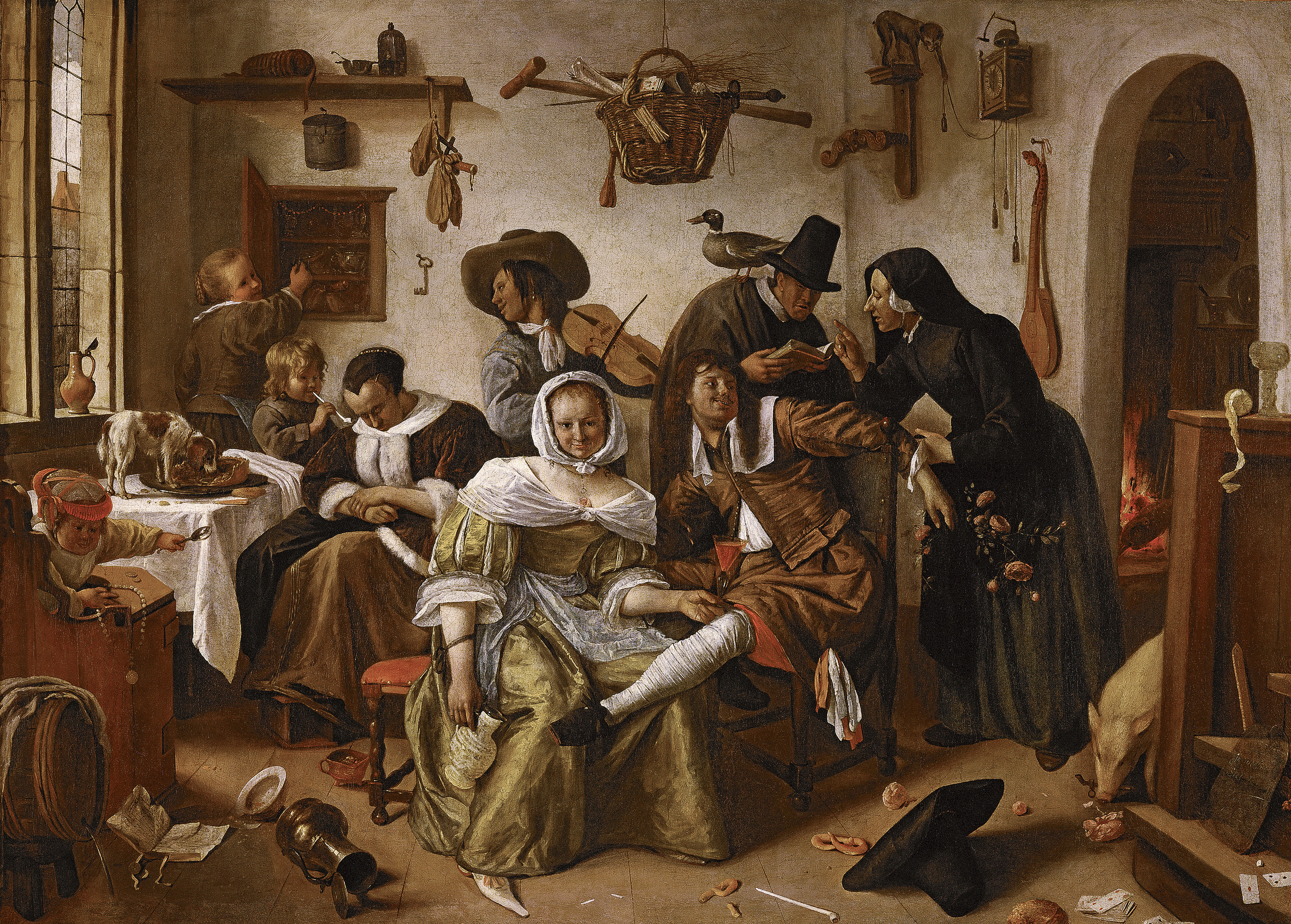
Jan Steen, Kunsthistorisches Museum Wien, Gemäldegalerie - "Die verkehrte Welt"

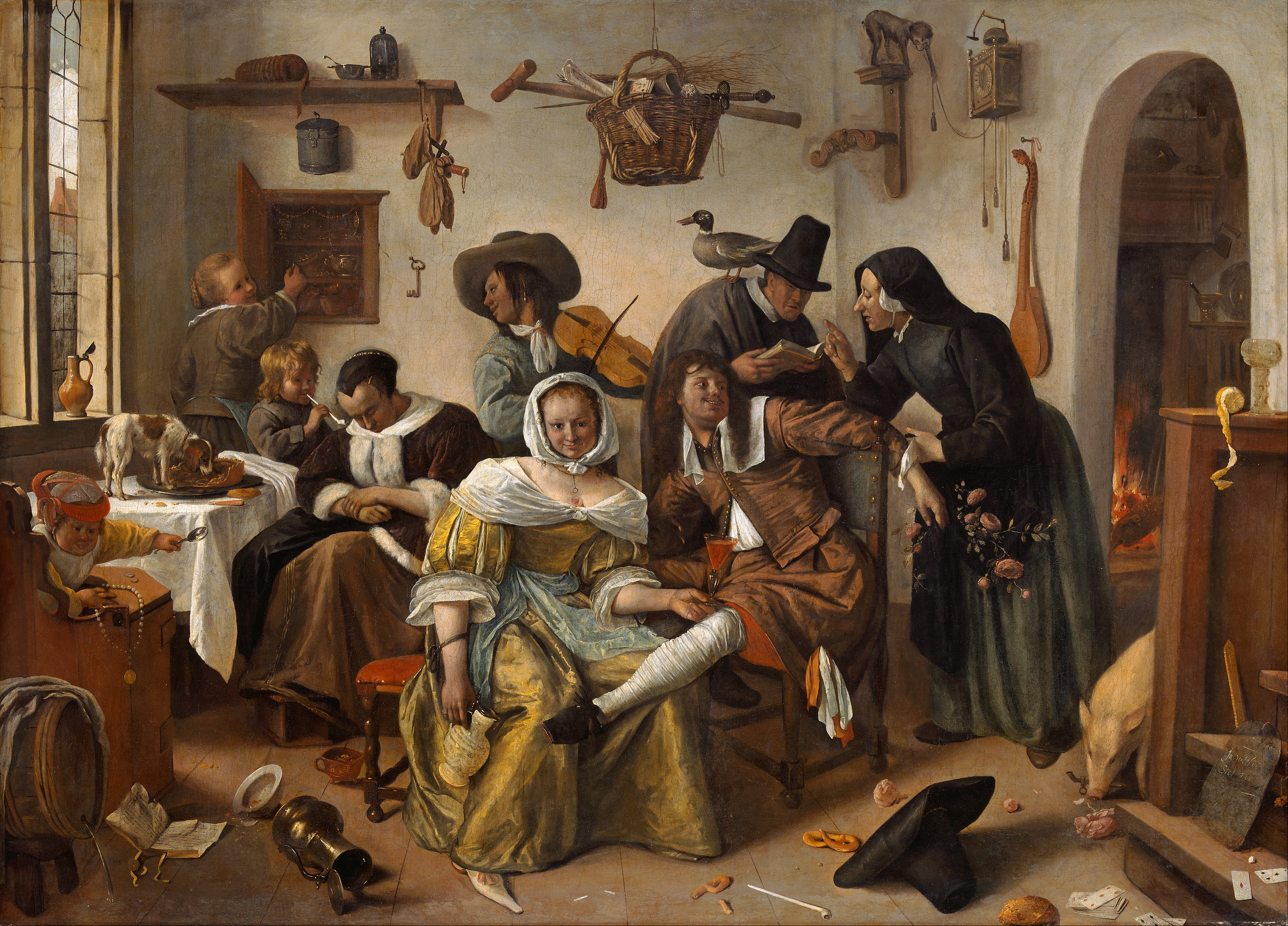
Jan Steen - Beware of Luxury (“In Weelde Siet Toe”)
