= Augustinus (disambiguation) =

Augustinus or Augustine of Hippo (354–430) was a Christian theologian.

Augustinus may also refer to:

== People with the given name ==
- Josephus Augustinus Brentano (1753–1821), Dutch art collector
- Augustinus Hellemans (1907–1992), Belgian footballer
- Augustinus Hunnaeus (1521–1577 or 1578), Belgian Catholic theologian
- Augustinus Kim Jong-soo (born 1956), South Korean Catholic prelate
- Augustinus Franz Kropfreiter (1936–2003), Austrian composer and organist
- Augustinus Mokoya (born 1977), Namibian footballer
- Augustinus Olomucensis (1467–1513), Czech writer and Roman Catholic priest
- Augustinus Rotundus (1520–1582), Polish humanist, jurist, political writer and historian
- Augustinus Terwesten (1649–1711), Dutch painter and engraver
- Augustinus Triumphus (1243–1328), Italian hermit and writer

== People with the surname ==
- Antonius Augustinus (1516–1586), Spanish historian, jurist and cleric
- Norm Augustinus, American satire writer, comedian and comic artist

== Other ==
- 17496 Augustinus, a main-belt asteroid
- Augustinus (Jansenist book), book on the writings of Augustine of Hippo
- Augustinus-Verein, 19th-century German Catholic press association
- Augustinus Hibernicus, AD 655 Latin treatise by an anonymous Irish writer and philosopher
- Callophrys augustinus, the brown elfin, a species of butterfly
- Chr. Augustinus Fabrikker, Danish tobacco company

== See also ==
- Augustine (disambiguation)
- Saint Augustine (disambiguation)
