= William Tilden Blodgett =

American art collector

William T. Blodgett
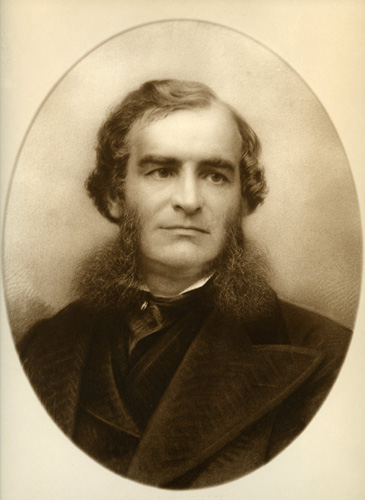
- Born: February 18, 1824; New York City, New York, U.S.
- Died: November 4, 1875 (aged 51); New York City, New York, U.S.
- Burial place: Green-Wood Cemetery

William Tilden Blodgett (February 18, 1824 – November 4, 1875) was a New York City art collector who was instrumental in founding the Metropolitan Museum of Art.

He was active in the American Civil War and organized the NYC Union League Club and the Sanitary Fair to raise funds for the wounded. He founded the newspaper The Nation and was a leader in establishing the American Museum of Natural History. He was a founding member of the committee to form the Met in 1869 and was its first chairman. He had been on the selection committee for the American works to be presented at the French exhibition of 1867 and thus felt he knew enough to purchase pictures for the young museum while abroad in 1870.

He purchased a total of 174 pictures which he financed together with John Taylor Johnston and about half of this "1871 purchase" is still in the museum.

These pictures are:

image	title	creator	inception	inventory number	The Met url
	The Meeting of Alexander the Great and Diogenes	Caspar de Crayer		71.1	MET
	A Vase with Flowers	Jacob Vosmaer		71.5	MET
	A Vase of Flowers	Margaretha Haverman	1716	71.6	MET
	The Holy Family with Saint Anne and the Young Baptist and His Parents	Jacob Jordaens		71.11	MET
	The Yard of the Inn at Emmaus	David Ryckaert		71.12	MET
	Rustic Interior	David Ryckaert		71.13	MET
	A Cat Stealing Fish	Giuseppe Recco		71.17	MET
	Vanitas Still Life	Evert Collier	1662	71.19	MET
	Battle Scene	Johannes Lingelbach	1671	71.23	MET
	The Sacrifice of Isaac	Giovanni Domenico Tiepolo		71.28	MET
	Interior of Saint Peter's, Rome	Giovanni Paolo Panini		71.31	MET
	Group Portrait: A Wedding Celebration	Gillis van Tilborgh		71.32	MET
	Saint Remigius Replenishing the Barrel of Wine; (interior) Saint Remigius and the Burning Wheat	Swiss Painter	1500	71.33ab	MET
	Portrait of a Woman	Bernhard Strigel		71.34	MET
	Jacob Willemsz. van Veen (1456–1535), the Artist's Father	Maarten van Heemskerck	1532	71.36	MET
	Saint Agapitus of Praeneste in the Arena; (interior) The Beheading of Saint Agapitus of Praeneste	Swiss Painter	1500	71.40ab	MET
	Saint Rosalie Interceding for the Plague-stricken of Palermo	Anthony van Dyck	1624	71.41	MET
	A Basket and Birds	Jan Fyt		71.43	MET
	A Hare and Birds	Jan Fyt		71.44	MET
	A Partridge and Small Game Birds	Jan Fyt		71.45	MET
	Portrait of a Young Woman	Cornelis de Vos		71.46	MET
	Interior of a Gothic Church at Night	Pieter Neeffs II		71.50	MET
	Midas Washing at the Source of the Pactolus	Nicolas Poussin		71.56	MET
	Ducks Resting in Sunshine	Jean-Baptiste Oudry	1753	71.57	MET
	The Farrier	Aert van der Neer		71.60	MET
	View of Haarlem and the Haarlemmer Meer	Jan van Goyen	1646	71.62	MET
	Portrait of a Man	Abraham de Vries	1643	71.63	MET
	Interior of a Kitchen	Willem Kalf		71.69	MET
	Portrait of Johan Hulshout (1623–1687)	Pieter Cornelisz van Slingelandt	1670	71.70	MET
	Portrait of a Man	Bartholomeus van der Helst	1647	71.73	MET
	Drawing the Eel	Salomon van Ruysdael		71.75	MET
	Malle Babbe	Style of Frans Hals	1700s	71.76	MET
	Still Life with a Glass and Oysters	Jan Davidsz. de Heem		71.78	MET
	Beggars at a Doorway	Master of the Béguins	1700s	71.80	MET
	Man in Armor (Mars?)	Style of Rembrandt	1700s	71.84	MET
	Dog Guarding Dead Game	Jean-Baptiste Oudry	1753	71.89	MET
	Study Head of a Woman	Jean-Baptiste Greuze		71.91	MET
	The Forge	Léonard Defrance		71.93	MET
	A Cavalry Engagement	Adam Frans van der Meulen		71.96	MET
	Marine	Salomon van Ruysdael	1650	71.98	MET
	Peasants Dancing and Feasting	David Teniers the Younger	1660	71.99	MET
	The Adoration of the Magi	Copy after Hugo van der Goes	1500s	71.100	MET
	The Rope Dance	Léonard Defrance		71.105	MET
	A Banquet	Dirck Hals	1628	71.108	MET
	The Spinner	Quirijn van Brekelenkam	1653	71.110	MET
	The Pigeon House	Roelof Jansz van Vries		71.116	MET
	Pomegranates and Other Fruit in a Landscape	Abraham Brueghel		71.118	MET
	The Grand Canal above the Rialto	Francesco Guardi		71.119	MET
	Santa Maria della Salute	Francesco Guardi		71.120	MET
	The Investiture of Bishop Harold as Duke of Franconia	Giovanni Battista Tiepolo		71.121	MET
	Peasants Dancing	Johannes Lingelbach	1651	71.123	MET
	Rest	Nicolaes Pieterszoon Berchem	1644	71.125	MET
	Johann I (1468–1532), the Constant, Elector of Saxony	Workshop of Lucas Cranach the Elder	1532	71.128	MET
	View of the Town of Alkmaar	Salomon van Ruysdael		71.135	MET
	Surprised, or Infidelity Found Out	Christian Wilhelm Ernst Dietrich		71.142	MET
	The Calling of Matthew	Workshop of Jan Sanders van Hemessen	1600s	71.155	MET
	The Mourning Virgin; The Man of Sorrows	Copy after Dieric Bouts	1600s	71.156–57	MET
	The Newborn Baby	Matthijs Naiveu	1675	71.160	MET
	The Adoration of the Shepherds	Christian Wilhelm Ernst Dietrich		71.162	MET
	Abraham's Parting from the Family of Lot	Jan Victors		71.170	MET
