= A Vase of Flowers (1716) =

Artwork by Margaretha Haverman

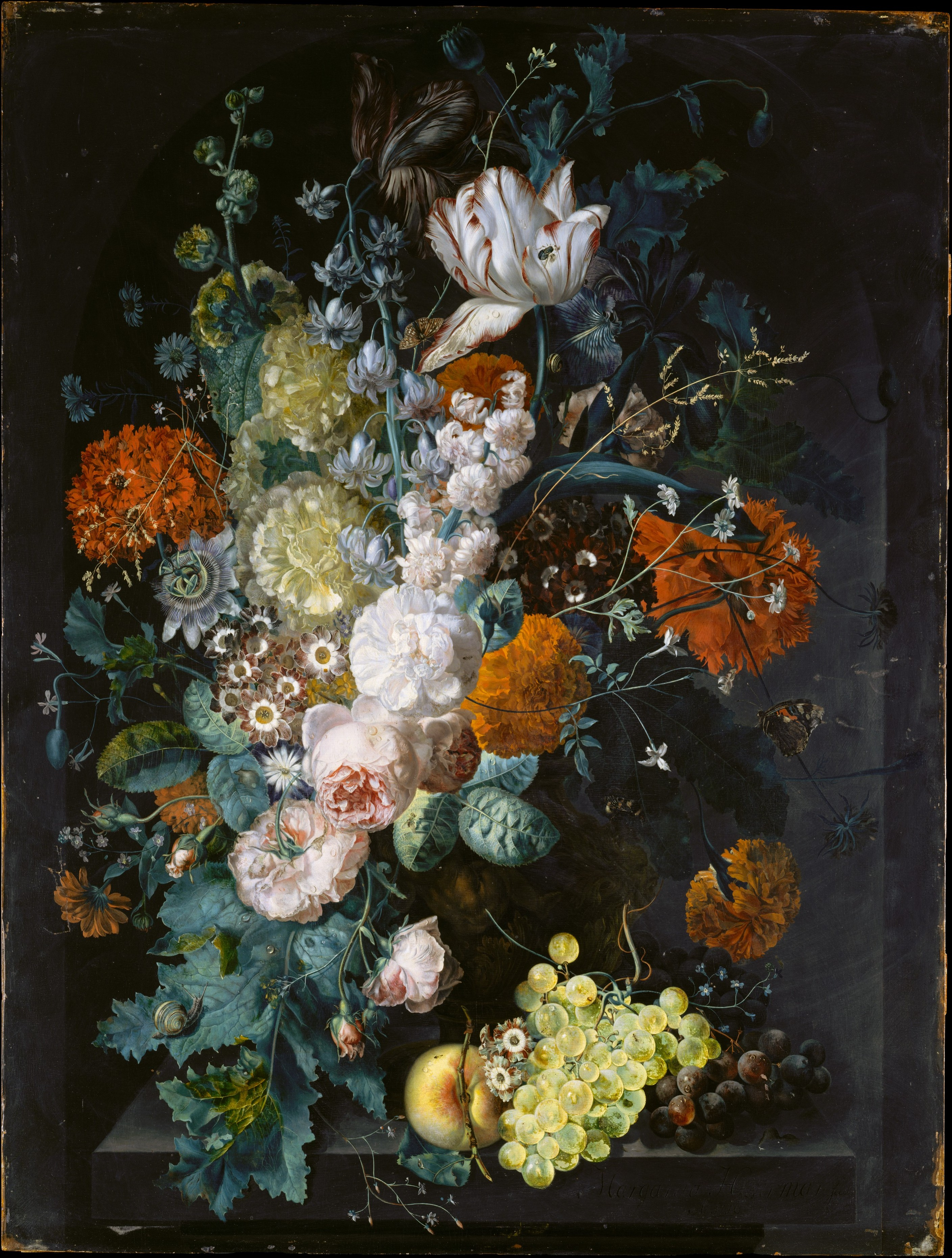
- Artist: Margaretha Haverman
- Year: 1716
- Medium: oil paint, panel
- Dimensions: 79.4 cm (31.3 in) × 60.3 cm (23.7 in)
- Location: Metropolitan Museum of Art
- Accession: 71.6

A Vase of Flowers is a 1716 floral painting by the Dutch painter Margaretha Haverman. It is in the collection of the Metropolitan Museum of Art.

== Acquisition ==
This work was acquired as part of the initial purchase in 1871 of 174 paintings bought in Europe by William Tilden Blodgett, one of the museum's initial donors and trustees. It is signed and dated Margareta Haverman fecit / A 1716. Little is known of Haverman besides the biography of her written by Jan van Gool. The only other work signed by her is in the Statens Museum for Kunst. In 1997 Delia Gaze remarked that this work was sold for 2100 francs to the Met and its pendant (now lost) was sold for 2050 francs. Blodgett must be credited with investing in the art of a woman, even if he let the pendant get away. Later curators must also be credited with keeping it, as only half of the 174 paintings are still in the collection.

== Description and interpretation ==
The work shows blooms of rosa × centifolia, dianthus, alcea rosea, calendula officinalis, passiflora, primula, poppy, tulip, forget-me-nots, the fruits peach and grape, and various insects such as a Red Admiral, fly, ants, and a snail. The vase itself is an object showing a baroque relief.

The painting follows in a tradition of Dutch and Flemish flower still life paintings showing flowers in a vase with insects. This was popular among Dutch women painters of Haverman's time whose works she would have been familiar with, as evidenced by the forged signature of Rachel Ruysch on a painting by Ottmar Elliger in the popular flowers in a vase on a ledge with insects style. This painting had been in the famous collection of Josephus Augustinus Brentano and was later purchased by Adriaan van der Hoop as by Ruysch. The painting illustrates the model the women worked from, as well as the relative value of Ruysch's work over that of Elliger later in the 18th-century. Haverman was registered as a pupil of the flower painter Jan van Huysum, who was known for guarding his secrets and keeping his painting knowledge in the family. This work shows the influence of Van Huysum in its "niche" setting.

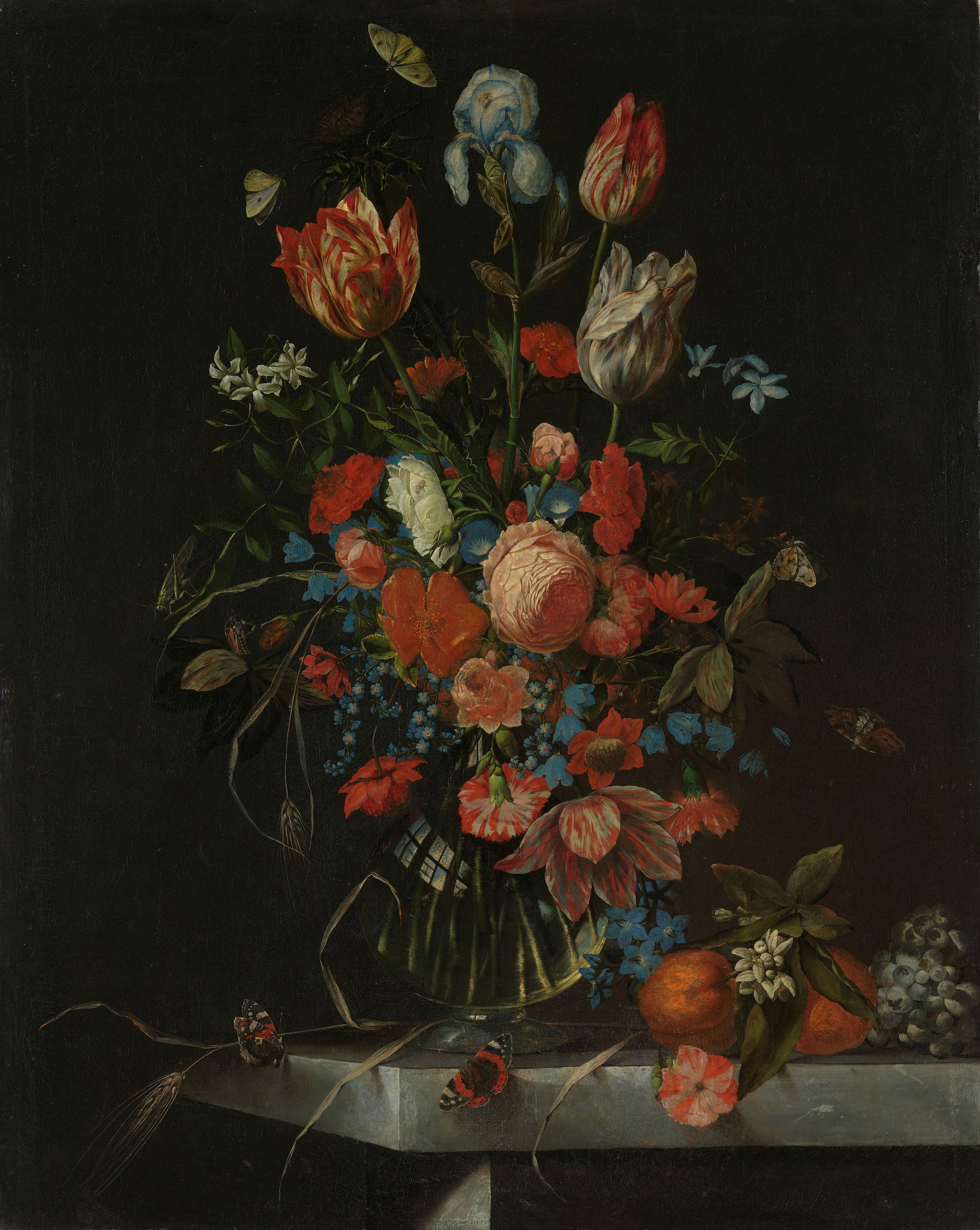
Painting by Ottmar Elliger of 1673 that was later adorned with the forged signature of Ruysch

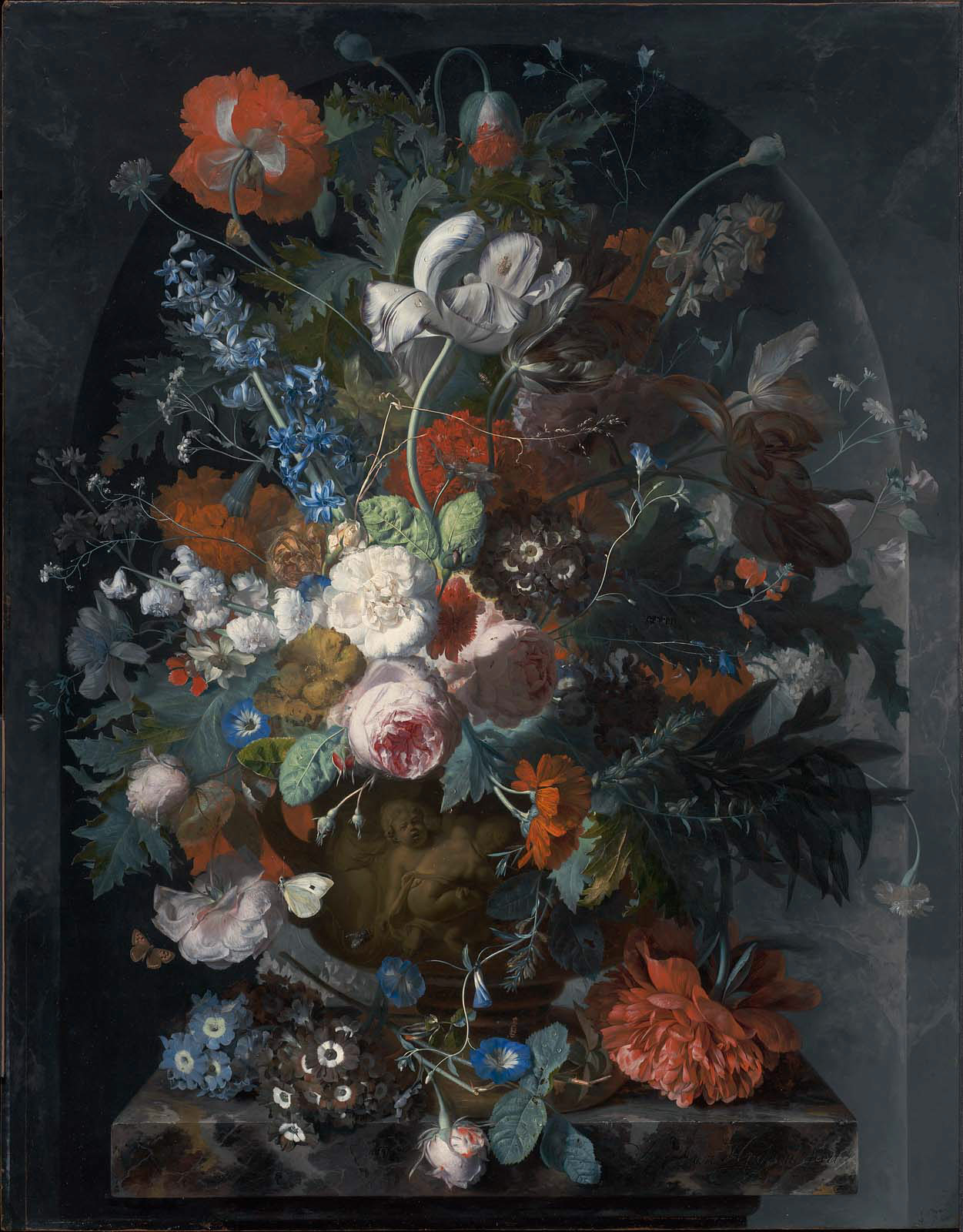
Painting by Jan van Huysum c. 1715 in the Museum of Fine Arts Boston that shows the same niche used by Haverman

Comparable works by Haverman's compatriots were:

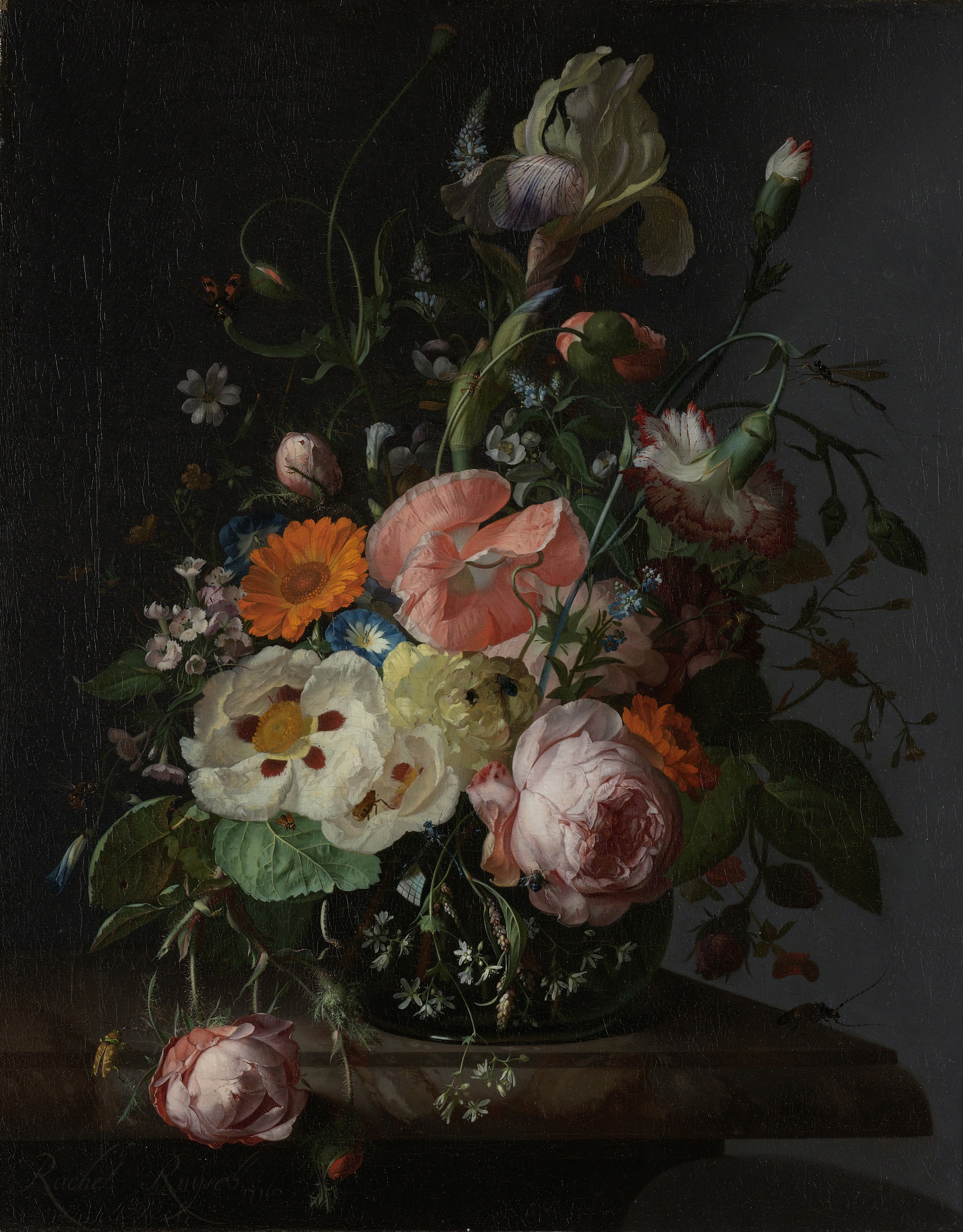
Still life with flowers on a marble slab, by Rachel Ruysch

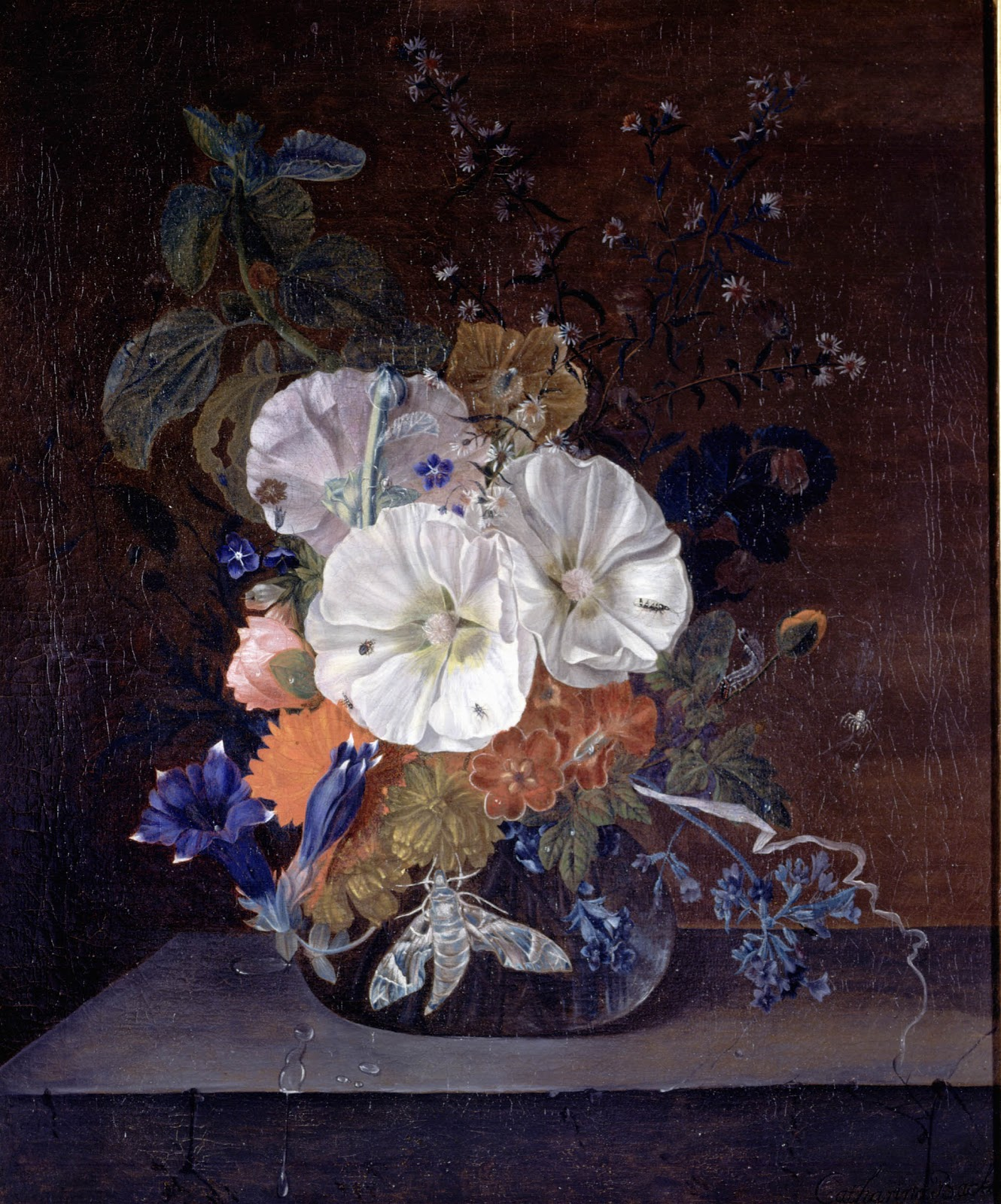
Flowers in a vase on a stone ledge, Catharina Backer

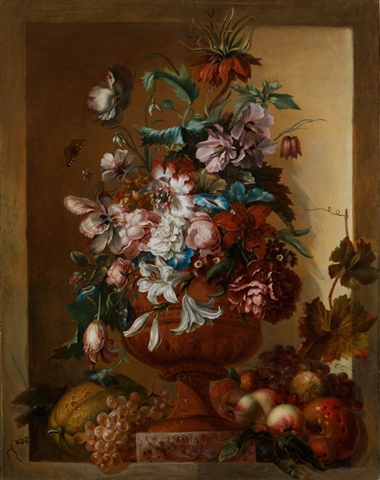
Flowers in a vase set in a stone niche, Jacoba Maria van Nickelen

Possible followers of her technique were Francina Margaretha van Huysum and Cornelia van der Mijn, whose green coloring appears to have faded to blue in the same way as the paintings of Backer and Haverman. This fading is possibly due to the use of a faded yellow lake pigment.

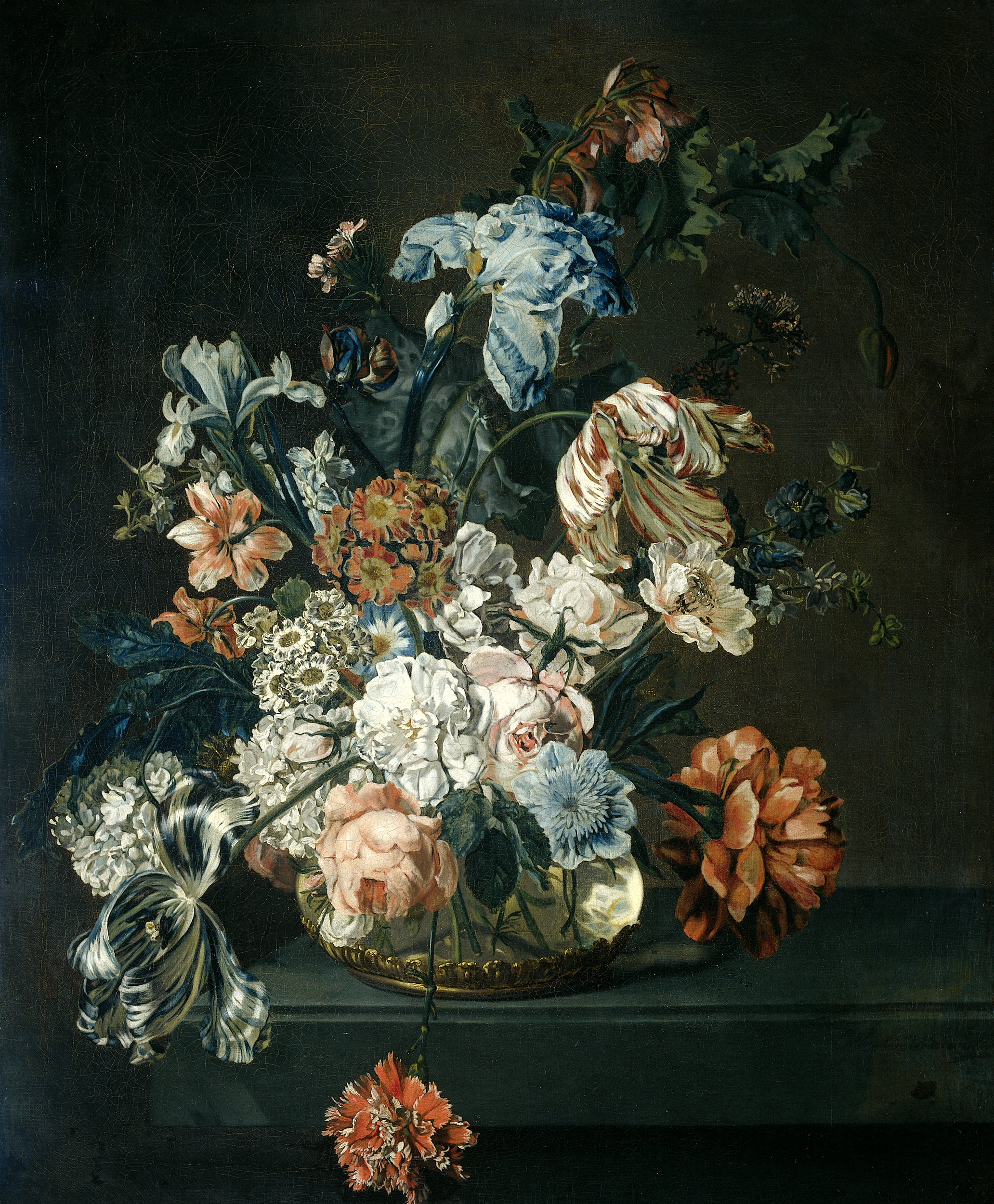
Flower Still Life, Cornelia van der Mijn

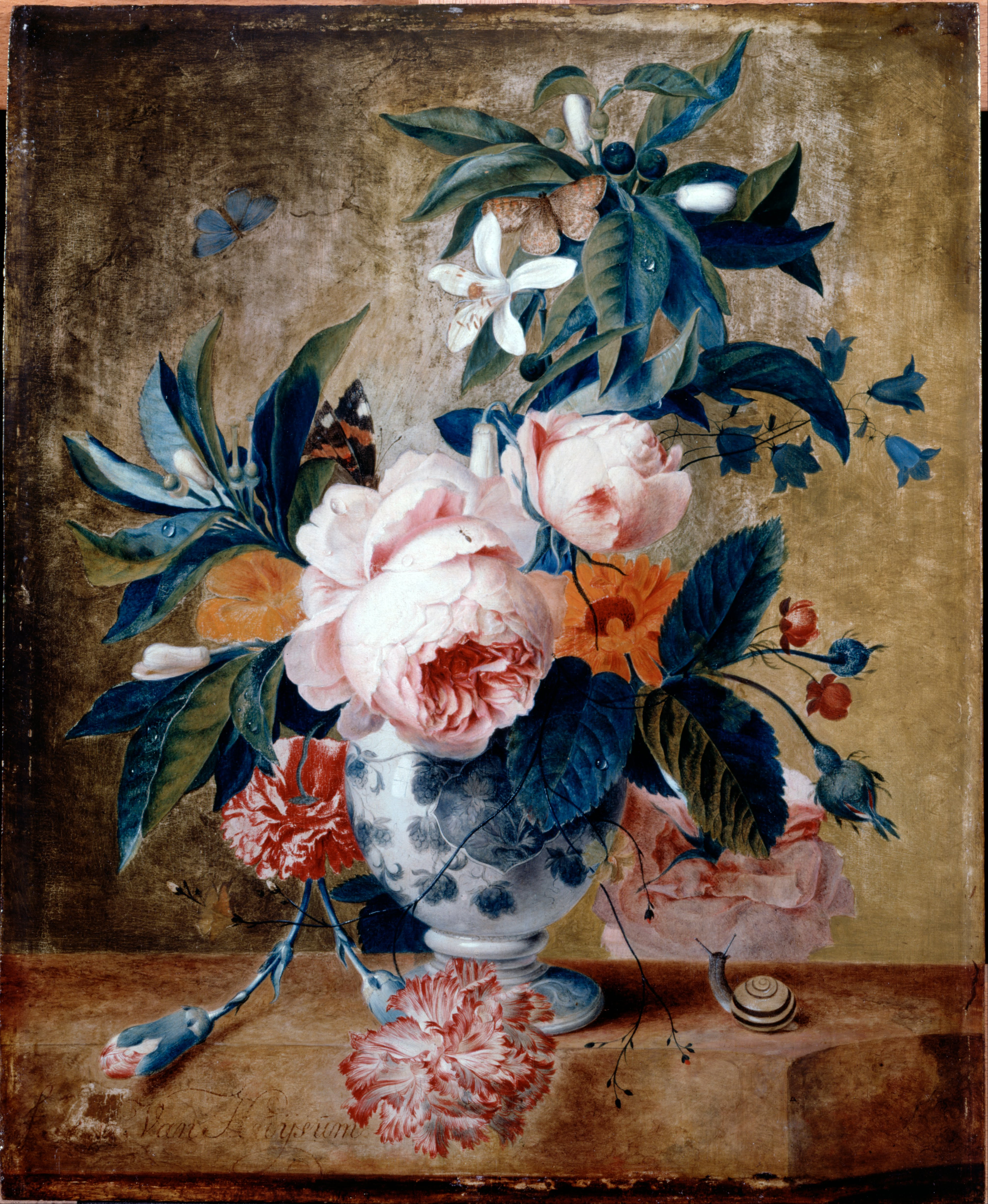
A Delft Vase with Flowers, Francina Margaretha van Huysum
