= River Landscape =

River Landscape may refer to:

- River landscape or riverscape
- River Landscape (Carracci), a 1590s painting by Annibale Carracci
- River Landscape (Salomon van Ruysdael), a 1642 painting by Salomon van Ruysdael
