= Dictionary of Women Artists =

2-volume biographical dictionary of female artists by Delia Gaze

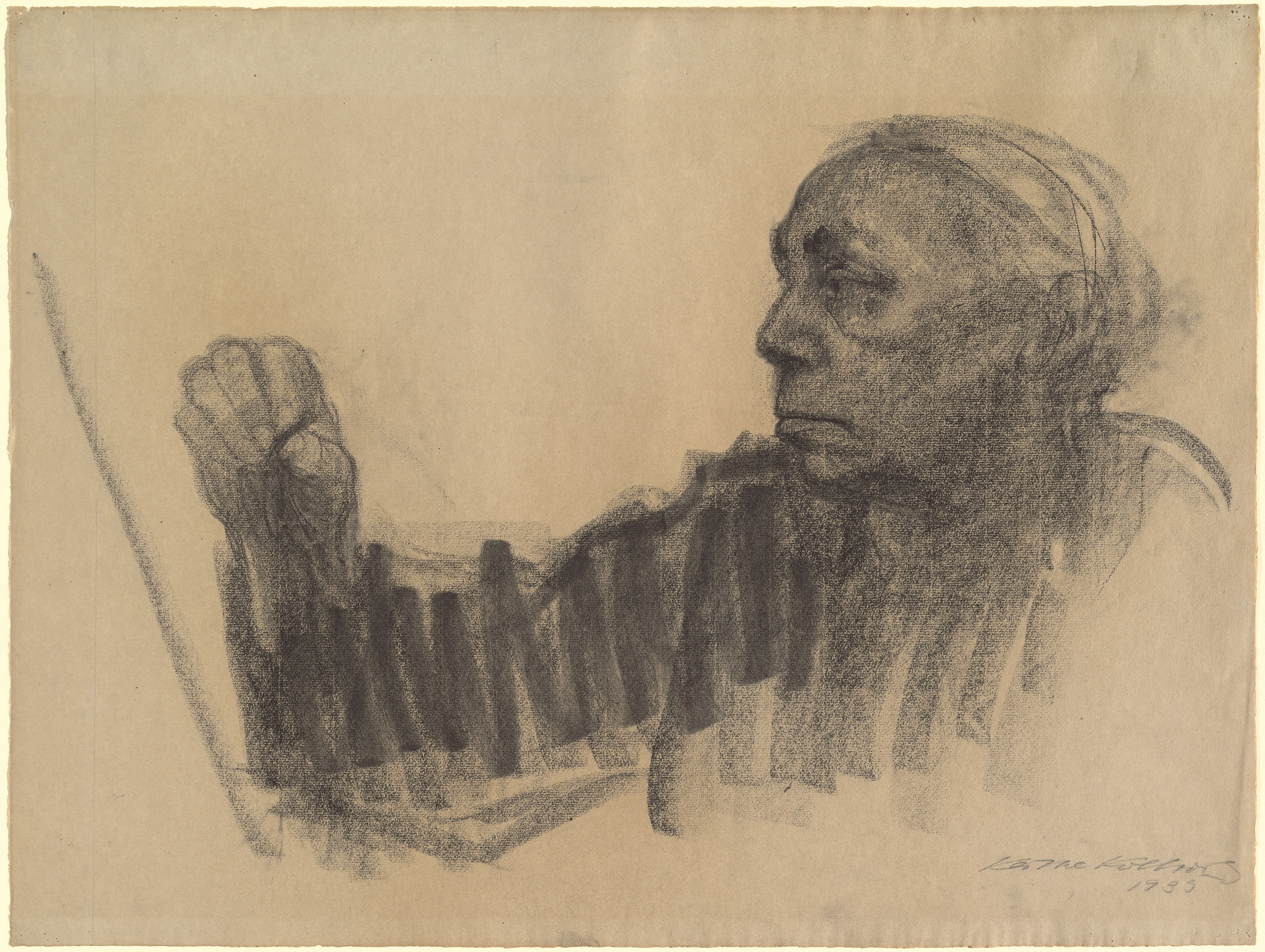
- Self-portrait by Käthe Kollwitz (cover illustration)
- Author: editor Delia Gaze
- Language: English
- Genre: Art history
- Publisher: Fitzroy Dearborn Publishers
- Publication date: 1997
- Publication place: United Kingdom, United States
- Pages: 1512 (2 volumes: "A-I", & "J-Z")
- ISBN: 9781884964213
- OCLC: 37693713
- Followed by: Concise Dictionary of Women Artists

Dictionary of Women Artists is a two-volume dictionary of 600 female artists born before 1945, going back to the Middle Ages. It was edited by Delia Gaze with 23 advisors and more than 100 contributors. Gaze is a writer for the Oxford Dictionary of National Biography and wrote several biographies that were released in the 2004 edition of the ODNB.

The book is widely cited as a reference for Western women artists and has a disclaimer that it is biased towards Western artists because of the constraints imposed on the selection. The book includes a list of artists in alphabetical order and chronological order and a bibliography of sources. Preceding the biographies is a series of "introductory surveys", a product of a somewhat dated notion in gender studies that women can be grouped into categories. There are many women artists mentioned in the surveys whose biography was not included, because there was not enough documented material to fulfill the inclusion criteria. The work was meant as a follow-up to a previous reference work including 21,000 women painters, sculptors, printmakers, and illustrators by Chris Petteys, the Dictionary of Women Artists: An International Dictionary of Women Artists Born Before 1900, published in 1985. The problem with that work is that the more well-documented women were included with countless "one-liners".

In 2001, Gaze produced a new "Concise" edition with a smaller selection in a single volume.
