= Ferry near Gorinchem =

1646 painting by Salomon van Ruysdael

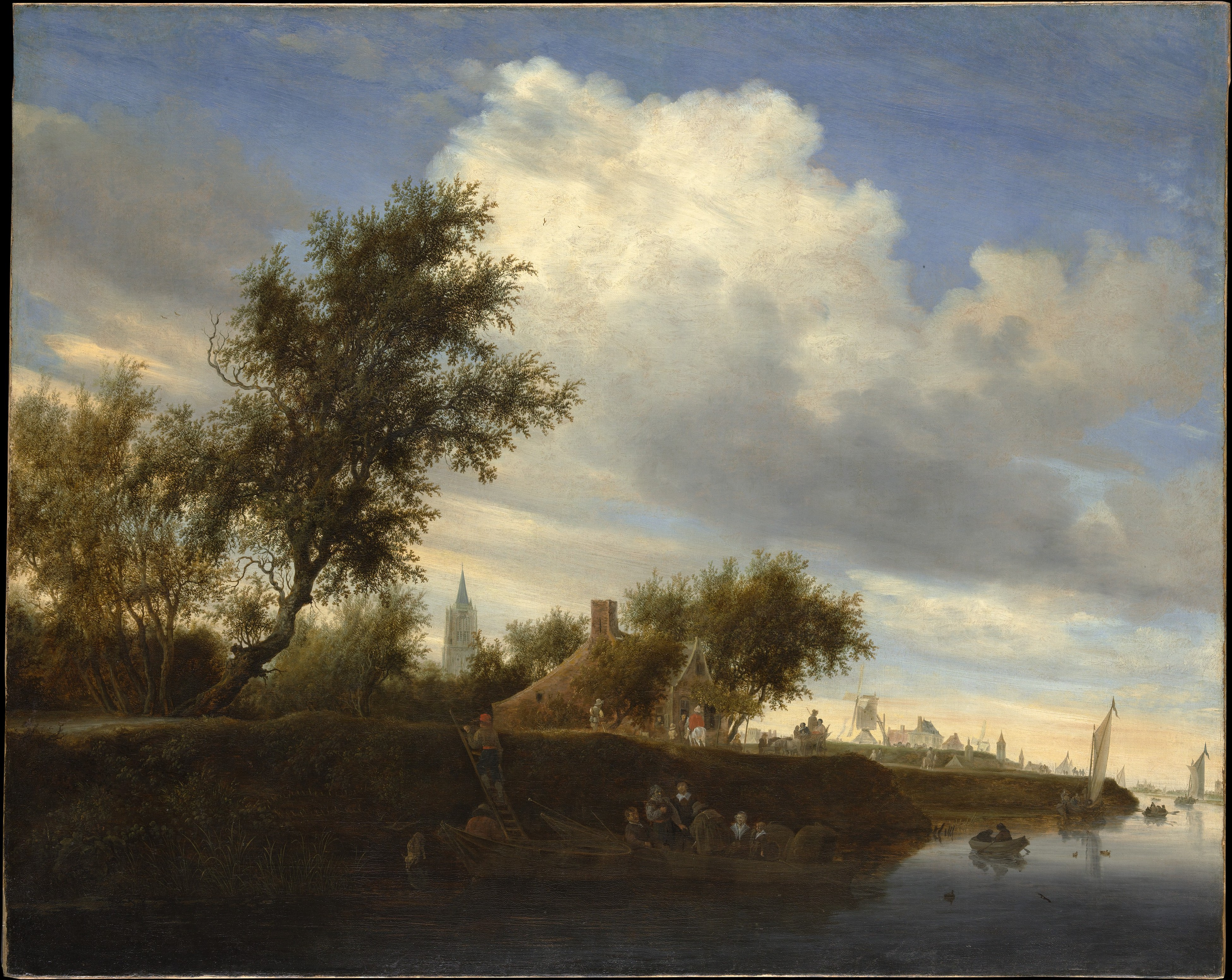
- Artist: Salomon van Ruysdael
- Year: 1646
- Dimensions: 106.4 cm × 133.4 cm (41.9 in × 52.5 in)
- Location: Metropolitan Museum of Art; New York

Ferry near Gorinchem is a mid-17th-century painting by Dutch artist Salomon van Ruysdael. Done in oil on canvas, the work depicts a riverside embankment near Gorinchem in the Netherlands; in addition, the painting also depicts the prominent St Jan's Tower of the Grote Kerk, the town's church. Ruysdael's rendering of the land near Gorinchem was possibly impacted due to the artist's owning of a mill on the river. The work is in the collection of the Metropolitan Museum of Art.

== See also ==
- River Landscape with Ferry
