= Ferris State University =

Public university in Big Rapids, Michigan, U.S.

- Former names: Big Rapids Industrial School (1884–1885); Ferris Industrial School (1885–1898); Ferris Institute (1898–1963); Ferris State College (1963–1987)
- Motto: Ferris Forward
- Type: Public university
- Established: September 1, 1884; 142 years ago
- Endowment: $131.9 million (2025)
- President: Bill Pink
- Provost: Robert P. Fleischman
- Faculty: 584
- Students: 9,959 (Fall 2024)
- Location: Big Rapids & Grand Rapids, Michigan, United States; 43°41′51″N 85°29′02″W
- Campus: Main campus: Rural, 880 acres (360 ha) Grand Rapids: urban
- Newspaper: The Ferris State Torch
- Colors: Crimson and Gold
- Nickname: Bulldogs
- Sporting affiliations: NCAA: Division II: GLIAC; Division I: CCHA
- Mascot: Brutus the Bulldog
- Website: ferris.edu

Ferris State University (FSU or Ferris) is a public university with its main campus in Big Rapids, Michigan, United States. It was founded in 1884 as Big Rapids Industrial School by Woodbridge N. Ferris and became a public institution in 1950. The university also has a satellite campus in Grand Rapids, Michigan.

Ferris is classified among "Professions-focused Undergraduate/Graduate-Doctorate Medium". Over 10,000 students study on its main campus, at one of the 19 off-campus locations across the state, or online. Two- and four-year degrees are offered through eight academic colleges and graduate degrees from six. Ferris grants professional doctoral degrees via its engineering, business, optometry and pharmacy colleges and a multidisciplinary doctorate of education in community college leadership.

The Ferris State Bulldogs compete in the NCAA Division II Great Lakes Intercollegiate Athletic Conference in all sports except men's ice hockey, in which the team is part of the NCAA Division I Central Collegiate Hockey Association.

== History ==
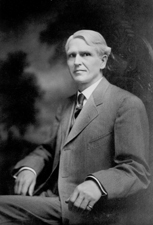
Woodbridge N. Ferris, founder and namesake of the university

Big Rapids Industrial School, as it was originally named, opened on September 1, 1884, in temporary quarters in the Vandersluis Block (present location of the currently empty former J.C. Penney Co. building) in Big Rapids. The goal of the school was to provide students with marketable skills for a changing society. By the beginning of the next semester in January 1885, the school changed its name to Ferris Industrial School. In January 1894, the school moved into and dedicated its new building, Old Main, on the corner of Oak and Ives Streets. At this same time, the school was incorporated with capital stock of $50,000.

In 1898, the institution was again renamed to Ferris Institute. In 1900, W. N. Ferris sold capital stock in Ferris Institute to the public, keeping a controlling interest in his own hands. It remained privately owned until August 25, 1931, when the Board of Incorporators, a group of 39 businessmen, purchased Ferris Institute from the old stockholders and selected a board of trustees from their number to govern the school.

In February 1943, alumnus Colin Smith introduced a bill in the legislature for the state to purchase Ferris Institute. It passed both houses, but was vetoed by Governor Harry Kelly. On May 17, 1949, Governor G. Mennen Williams signed the bill accepting Ferris Institute as a gift to the state of Michigan, which took over its governance on July 1, 1950. Before the state took control, though, fire destroyed the Old Main and the Old Pharmacy buildings on February 21, 1950. Only the Alumni Building and some minor buildings were left standing. Immediate rebuilding of the institute began, and on July 1, 1963, it was again renamed, this time as Ferris State College. In November 1987, the institution became Ferris State University.

In 1950, Ferris consisted entirely of one permanent structure, the Alumni Building, and some surplus Army barracks. At that time, fewer than 1,000 students were enrolled, with fewer than 50 faculty members, and the campus itself covered less than 20 acres (8.1 ha). By contrast, current enrollment is more than 10,000, and the 880-acre (360 ha) campus contains 115 buildings, including educational, administrative, maintenance, student-activity, and residence-hall facilities.

== Academics ==
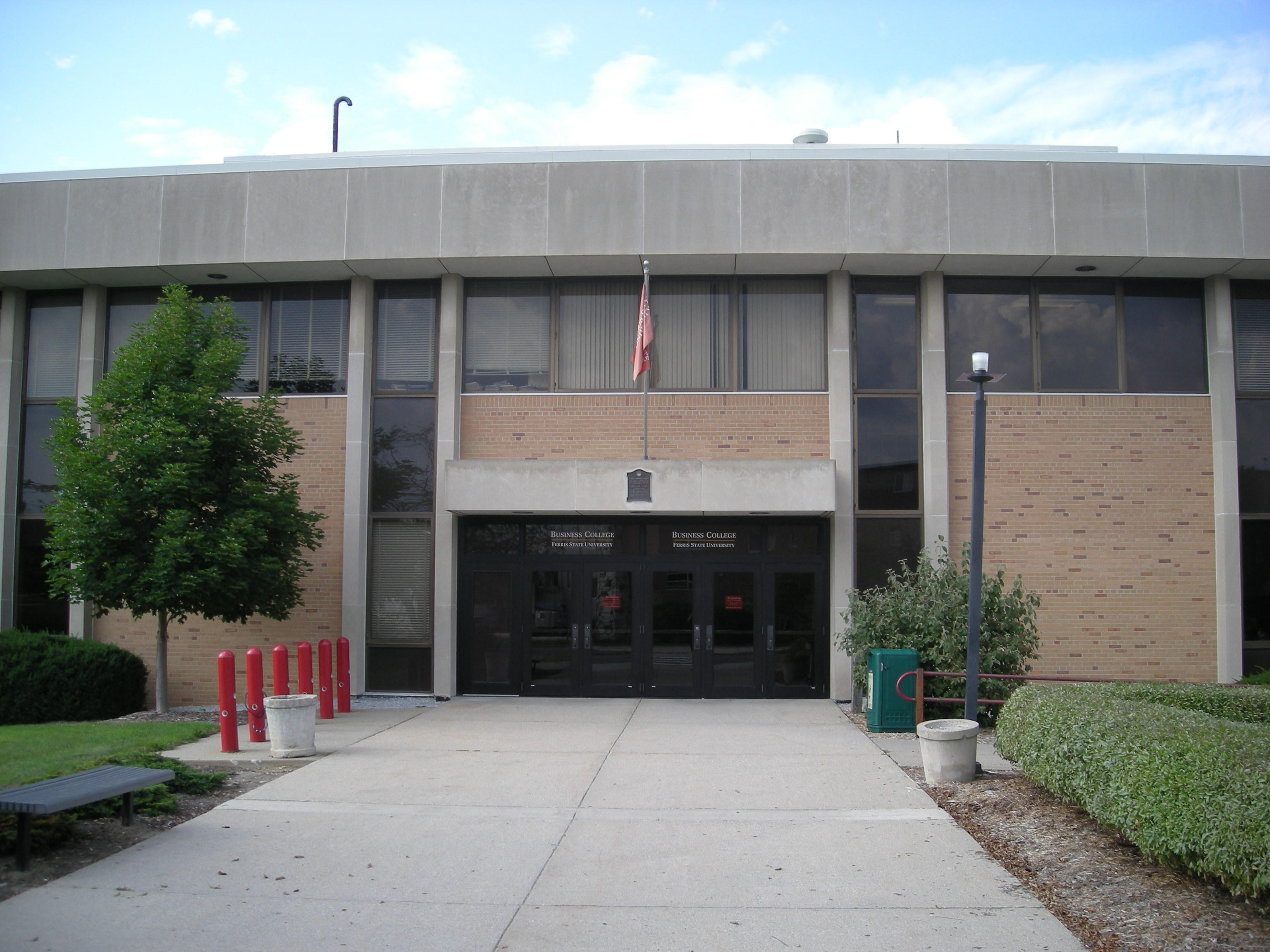
College of Business building

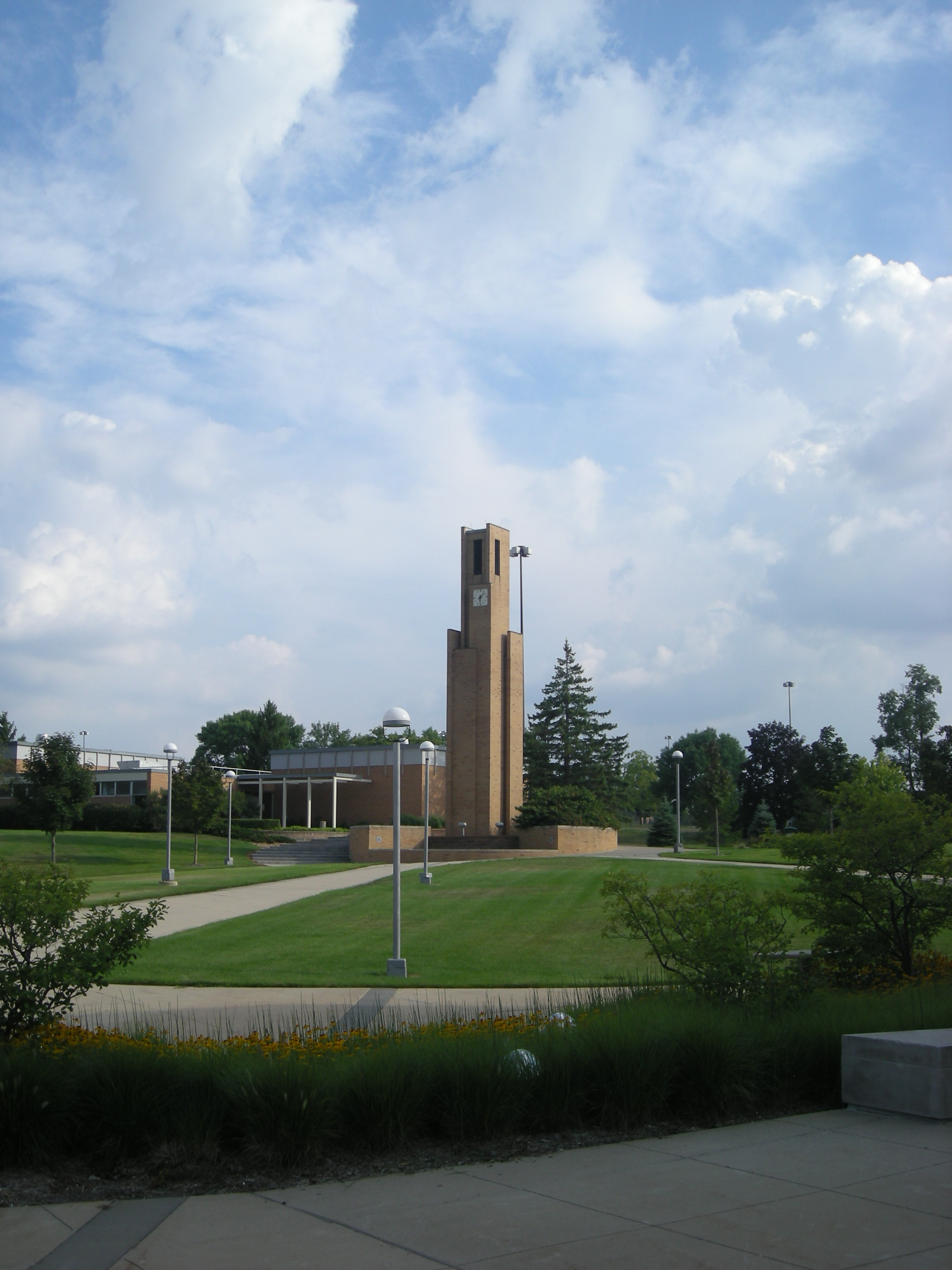
Carillon Tower and Music Center

The university has eight colleges offering more than 170 educational programs—Arts and Sciences, Business, Education and Human Services, Engineering Technology, Health Professions, the Kendall College of Art and Design, Michigan College of Optometry, and Pharmacy. Program offerings lead to bachelor's and associate degrees and certificates. Master's degrees in information security and intelligence, career and technical education, criminal justice, business administration, curriculum and instruction, nursing, and fine arts are available. Ferris also offers doctoral degrees in optometry, pharmacy, nursing practice, and community college leadership.

Kendall College of Art and Design offers graduate and undergraduate fine arts degrees, as well as a Bachelor of Science degree in art history. Kendall's campus is in Grand Rapids, Michigan.

The Michigan College of Optometry is one of 16 schools or colleges of optometry in the United States and the only college of optometry in Michigan. MCO doctors and student interns deliver eye care to patients in the region. Graduates receive a Doctor of Optometry degree.

The College of Pharmacy graduates comprise more than half of Michigan's practicing pharmacists. Graduates receive a Doctor of Pharmacy degree.

Ferris State's most popular undergraduate majors, in order by 2021 graduates, were:

1. Criminal Justice/Police Science (253)
2. Business Administration and Management (211)
3. Registered Nursing/Registered Nurse (139)
4. Animation, Interactive Technology, Video Graphics, and Special Effects (80)
5. Biology/Biological Sciences (76)
6. General Studies (63)
7. Mechanical/Mechanical Engineering Technology/Technician (55)

=== Admissions ===
Ferris State University is considered "less selective" by U.S. News & World Report. For the class of 2025 (enrolling fall 2021), Ferris State University received 10,480 applications and accepted 8,884 (84.8%), with 1,405 enrolling. The middle 50% range of SAT scores for enrolling freshmen was 910–1050. The middle 50% ACT composite score range was 19–26.

Fall first-time freshman statistics
Measure	2021	2020	2019	2018	2017	2016
Applicants	10,480	8,581	9,175	10,284	9,926	10,883
Admits	8,884	7,076	7,949	8,320	7,361	8,455
Admit rate	84.8	82.5	86.6	80.9	74.2	77.7
Enrolled	1,405	1,540	1,892	1,882	1,822	1,830
Yield rate	15.8	21.8	23.8	22.6	24.8	21.6
ACT composite* (out of 36)	19–26	18–26	18–25	19–26	19–25	19–25
SAT composite* (out of 1600)	910–1050	1050–1110	980–1090	940–1170	—	—

• middle 50% range

=== Honors program ===
The Honors Program includes students from every college and school at Ferris except Kendall—students from almost every major participate in the Honors Program. About a third of the Honors students major in pre-pharmacy or similar disciplines, but a large number of students are in the College of Business, College of Health Professions, and College of Engineering Technology. Honors students live in specialized residence halls (mostly in single rooms), take enhanced general education courses, attend cultural events, and complete 15 hours of community service per semester.

=== Reputation and rankings ===
Academic rankings

National
- Forbes: 328
- U.S. News & World Report: 304
- Washington Monthly: 174

Global
- QS: 1970
- THE: 501-600

Forbes listed Ferris State University 219th in their ranking for Best Public Colleges. They also ranked the university 251th in Research Universities and 99th In The Midwest. U.S. News & World Report ranked Ferris State University's College of Pharmacy is in the top tier of graduate pharmacy programs in the nation, ranking in 60th in a list of 141 schools and colleges offering Doctor of Pharmacy degrees accredited by the Accreditation Council for Pharmacy Education. The school was also listed among the nation's Best Value College for the 2023–24 seasons, basing the institution for their academics, student success outcomes, financial aid and net price.

== Campus ==
Ferris State University joined the state's higher education system in 1950. The campus was all but destroyed by fire the same year. The only building to survive was the Alumni Building, built in 1929, at the north edge of campus. Since the fire, more than 117 buildings have been built on the main campus.

=== Main campus ===
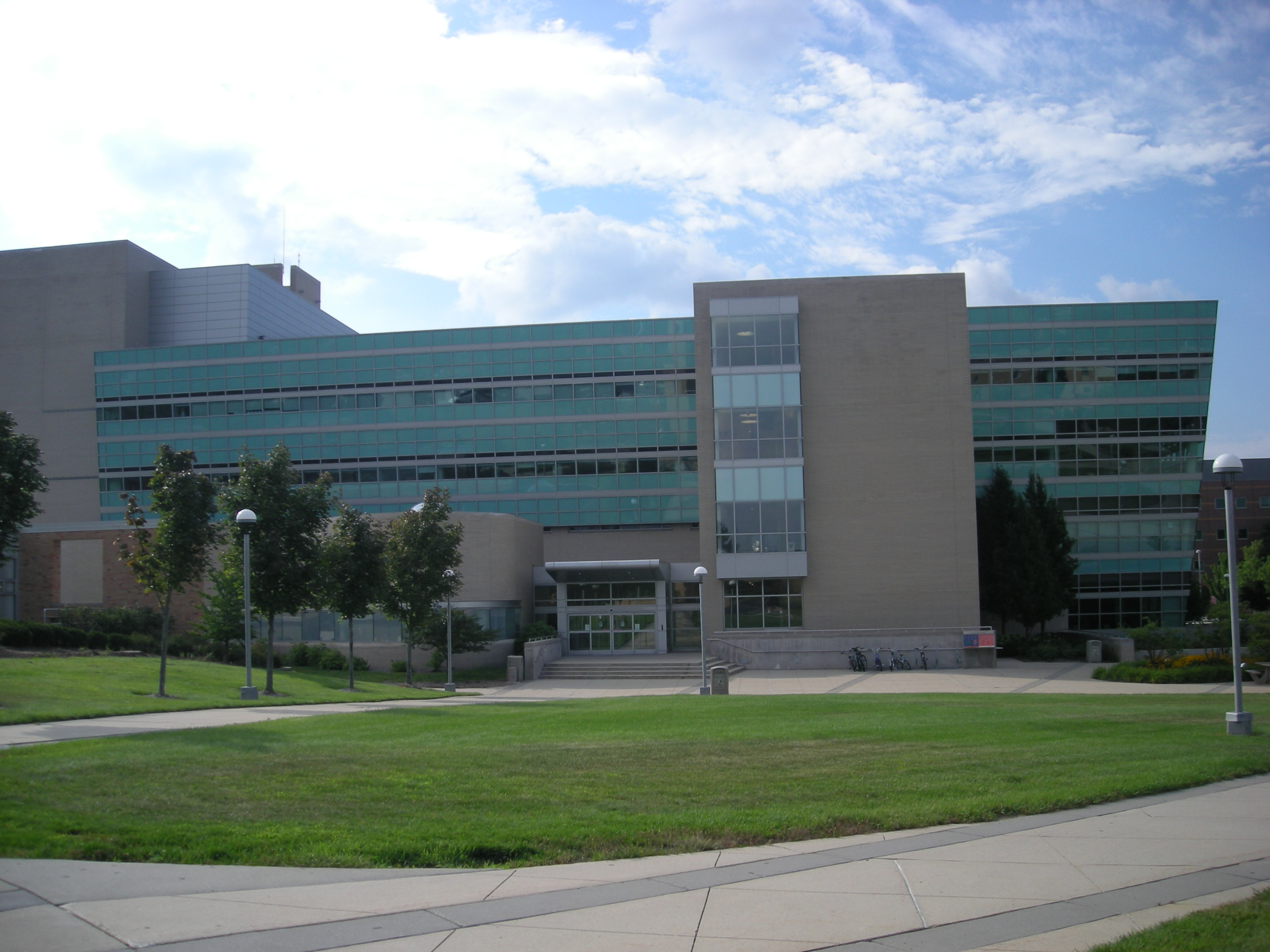
Ferris Library for Information, Technology and Education (FLITE)

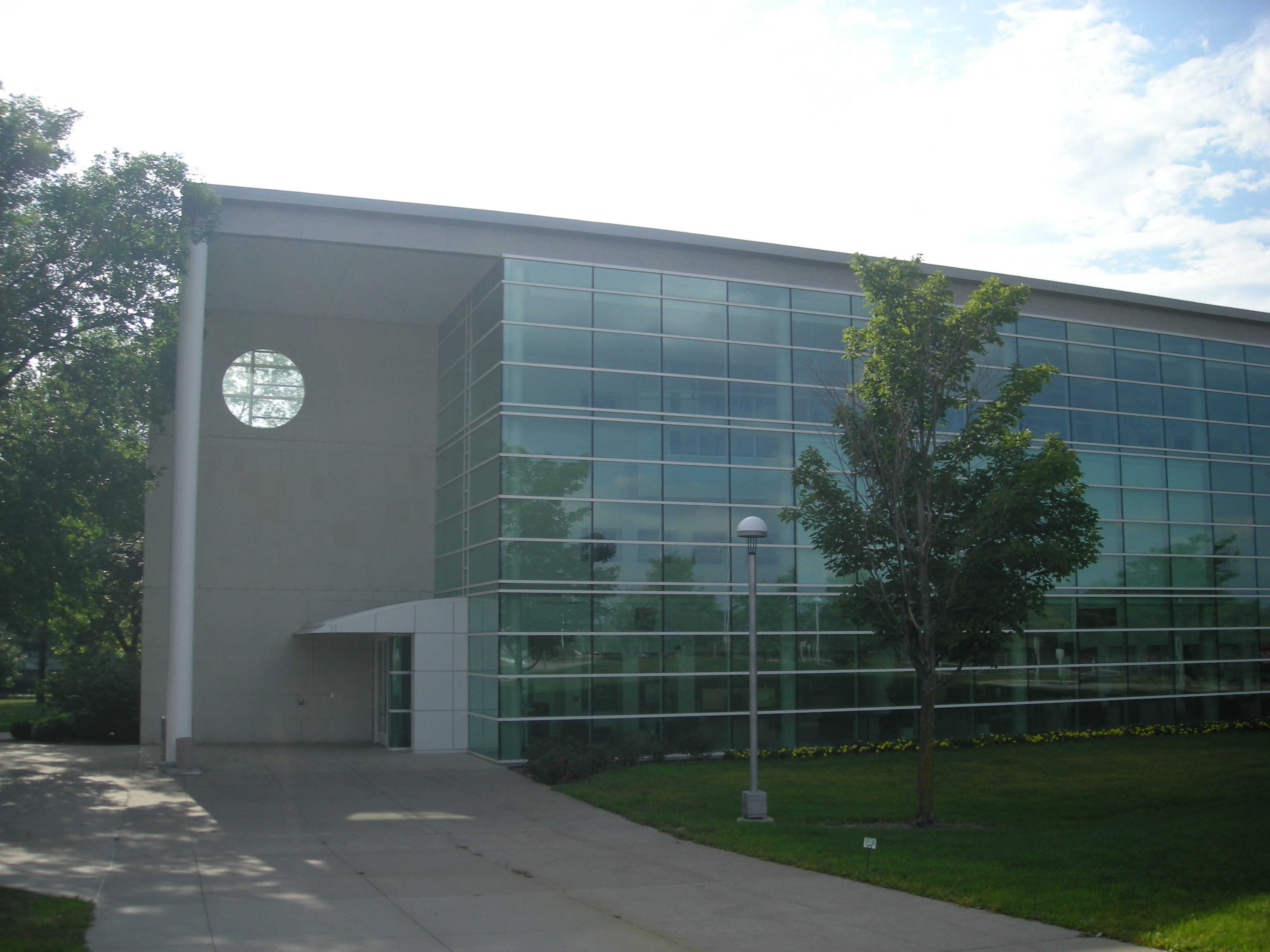
Timme Center for Student Services

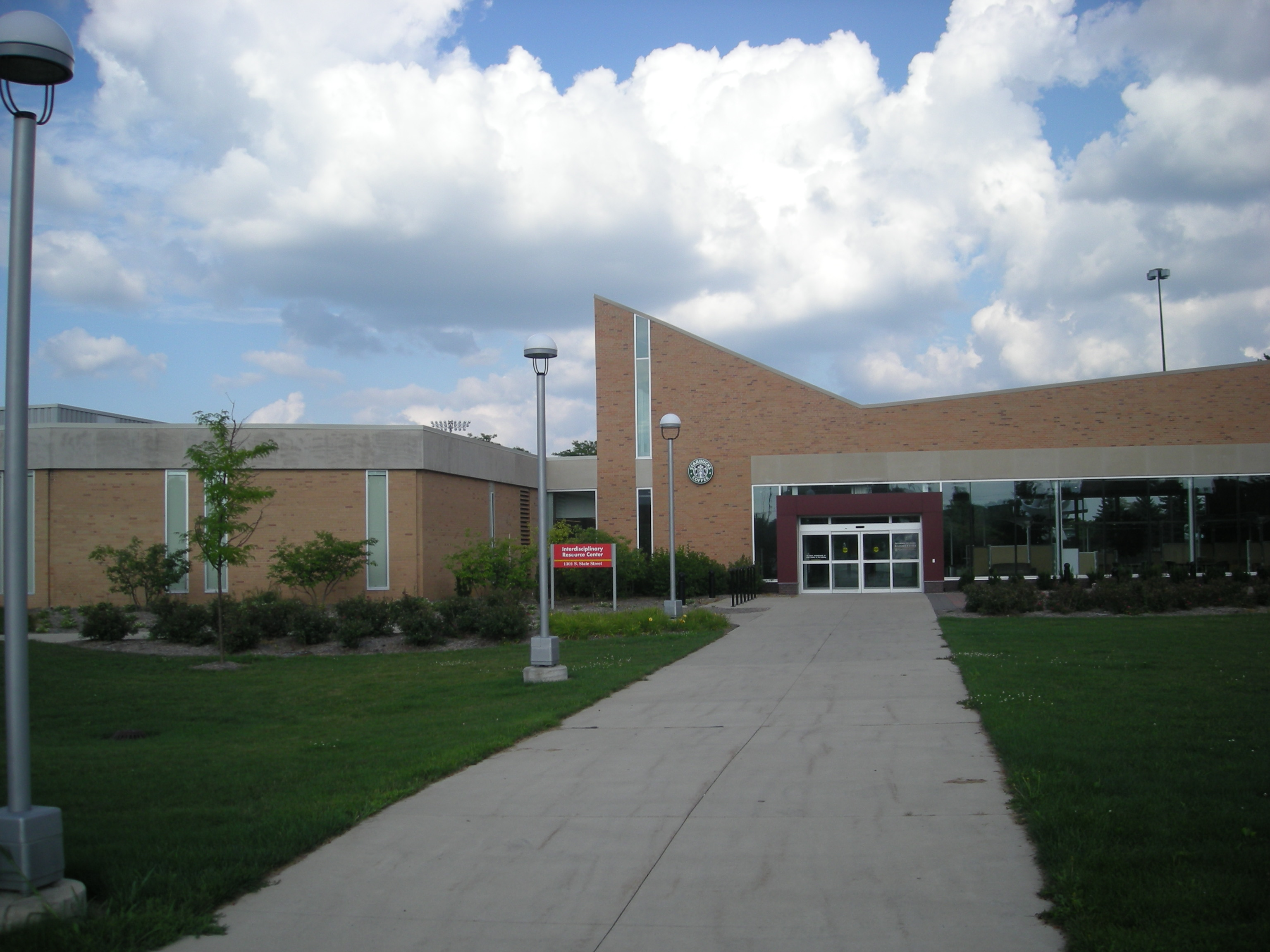
Interdisciplinary Resource Center

Located on the southern edge of the City of Big Rapids, straddling the border between Big Rapids Township and the city, the university has over 880 acres (3.6 km^{2}) for its main campus. The campus begins about four blocks south of the historic central business district. It is bordered on the north by single-family homes built in the early to middle of the twentieth century. North of Perry Street, the university is bordered by strip commercial development. The university is bordered to the south and west by Big Rapids Township. The township is mostly undeveloped and rural.

The main campus is within easy walking distance of downtown Big Rapids with its restaurants, shops, movie theater, art gallery and municipal park. Bicyclists, hikers and in-line skaters have easy access to the White Pine Trail, Michigan's longest "rails to trails" project.

The campus has undergone major changes since 1990. Several new and renovated buildings, reworked roads and parking areas, pedestrian walkways, and greenspace areas have contributed to the changes on campus.

- The National Elastomer Center was added in 1998 to house the Plastics Engineering and Rubber Engineering Technology programs.
- The FLITE building (FSU Library for Information, Technology and Education), located at the termination of Perry Street, reintroduced the historic front entrance to the university, and defined the adjacent quad at the campus epicenter.
- The renovation of the Timme Library to the Timme Center for Student Services consolidated previously scattered student services in one location.
- The Granger Center for Construction and HVACR, stimulated redevelopment of the northern part of campus. The building was designed with an open layout that left most of the mechanical components open for viewing by the students as a working lab.
- The IRC Connector between the Business School and the Interdisciplinary Resource Center (IRC) created a collaborative meeting and lounge space which is heavily used by students at all hours.
- Opening of the new Michigan College of Optometry building in January 2011.
- North Hall opened in August 2017. It is a "Freshman Experience" Residence Hall, and features classrooms, study rooms, a lounge, game room, and a kitchen for residents.

The university has 3,483,298 square feet (323,609.0 m^{2}) of building space on the Big Rapids campus, with 1,764,658 square feet (163,942.1 m^{2}) in academic use.

=== Satellite and online locations ===
In addition to the main campus, Ferris State University has programs offered at 19 off-campus locations including Dowagiac, Grand Rapids, Flint, Lansing, Traverse City, and University Center. Although the main campus of the university is located in a rural setting the satellite locations are all located in larger, more urban communities. Some programs, such as the Doctor of Pharmacy program, are split between locations having students take the first 2 years of study at a campus in one city and the next 2 years at another. These locations are managed by the division of Extended and International Operations under the heading Ferris Statewide and Online.

== Organization ==
Ferris State University is governed by a board of trustees which has general supervision of the institution and controls and directs institutional expenditures. Members of the Board serve eight-year, staggered terms as appointed by the Governor with the advice and consent of the State Senate.

The president of the university is appointed by the board of trustees as its principal executive officer and serves at its pleasure. The president is an ex-officio member of the board without the right to vote. At present, the university is led by its 19th president, Bill Pink, who was inaugurated on June 30, 2022.

=== Student government ===
The mission of the Student Government of Ferris State University is to represent student interests in all aspects of campus life as well as maintain open channels of communication between students, faculty, staff, administration, and the Big Rapids community.

The General Assembly of Student Government is composed of two voting bodies; a House of Representatives and a Senate. Each registered student organization (RSO) in good standing is eligible to hold one seat on the House of Representatives. Senators are elected by the students in their respective academic colleges.

The leadership rests in the Cabinet; president, executive vice president, treasurer, director of finance, and director of internal assessment.

== Athletics ==
The Ferris State Bulldogs are the athletic teams for the university. Ferris State offers an intercollegiate athletic program that includes 14 men's and women's sports at the NCAA Division II level, except for men's ice hockey which competes in NCAA Division I. Ferris State is a member of the Great Lakes Intercollegiate Athletic Conference (GLIAC) in all sports except men's ice hockey, in which the team is part of the Central Collegiate Hockey Association.

Year in and year out, nearly 400 student-athletes have the opportunity to compete for the Bulldogs on a regional and national level for conference titles and NCAA Championships. Ferris' men's club ice hockey won the American Collegiate Hockey Association Division II national title in 1994. In March 2018, the men's basketball team won the NCAA Division II national championship. The football team won back-to-back NCAA Division II national championships in December 2021 and December 2022. The football team won two more back-to-back NCAA D-II championships in December 2024 and 2025, establishing Ferris State as a perennial powerhouse. The bulldogs have won 41 straight games, as they head into the NCAA Division-II playoffs with the number 1 overall seed in the Super Region Three. The football team looks to win a 5th Division-II National Championship in 6 years.

=== Sports ===
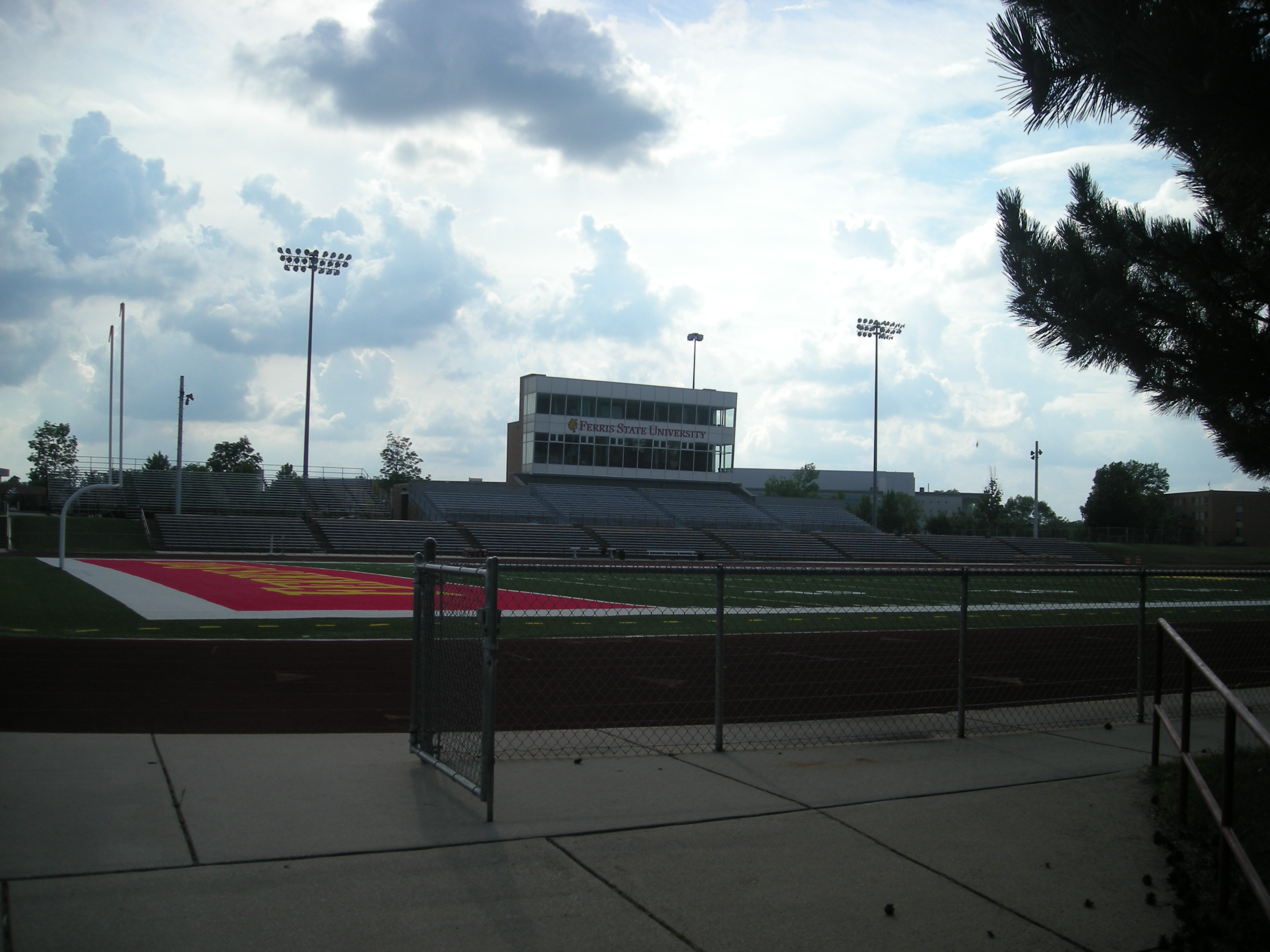
Top Taggart Field, Ferris State's football stadium

Men's Sports	Women's Sports
Basketball	Basketball
	Cheerleading
Cross Country	Cross Country
Football	
Golf	Golf
	Soccer
Ice Hockey	
	Softball
Tennis	Tennis
Track and field	Track and field
	Volleyball

== Student life ==
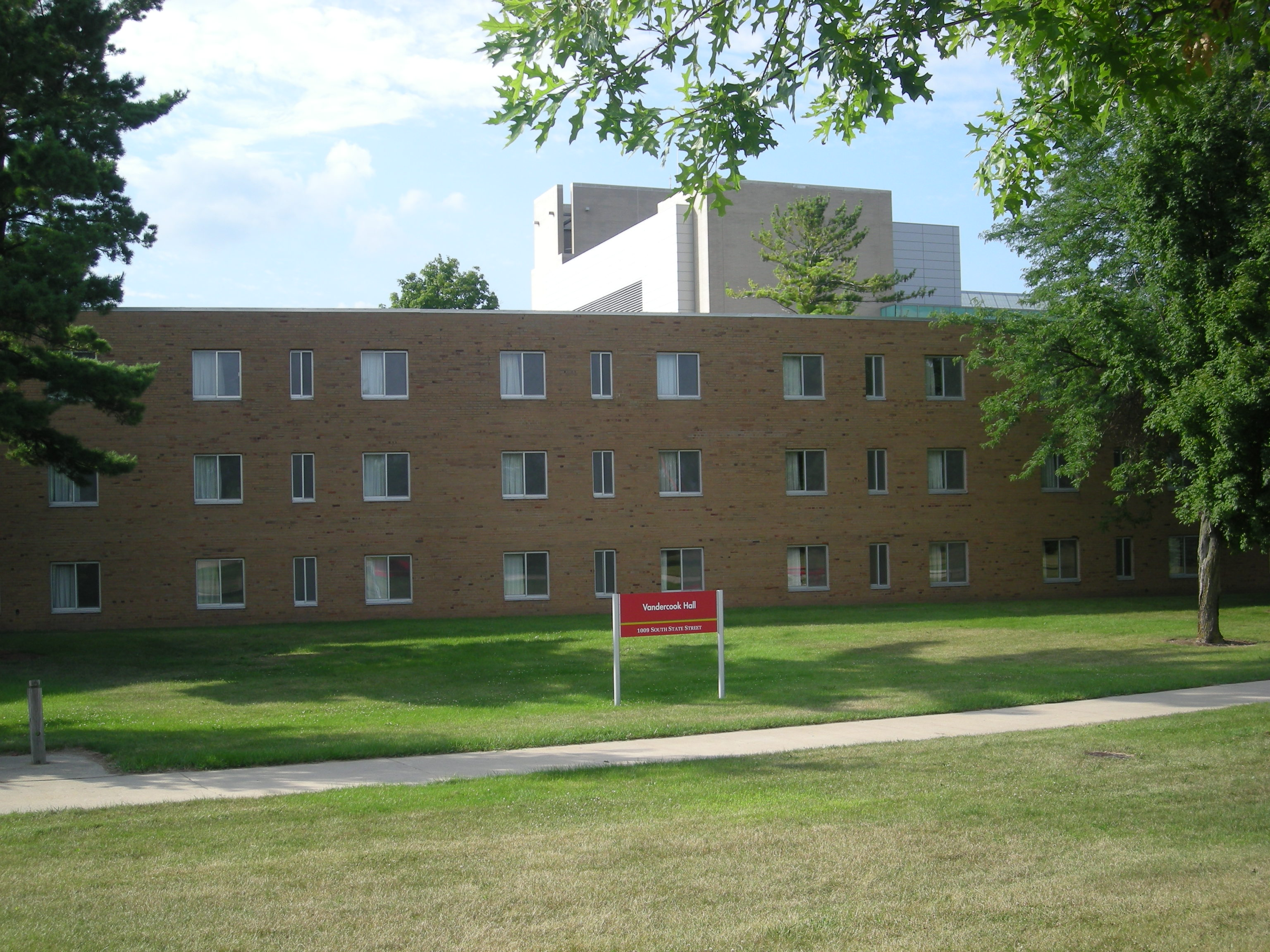
Vandercook Hall

=== Enrollment decline ===
Ferris State has seen a dramatic drop in enrollment in recent years. In 2013 total enrollment was 14,707. In 2021 total enrollment had dropped to 10,361.

=== Ferris State Torch ===
The Ferris State Torch is a student-run newspaper first published in 1931.

=== Greek life ===
There are dozens of Greek organizations on campus.

== School songs ==
=== Fight song ===
"Fighting Bulldogs" (1958)
30 second sample from Ferris State College Marching Band

The first performance of the new fight song, "Fighting Bulldogs" was at Homecoming in 1958.

=== Alma mater ===
"Ferris Fidelity" (1957)
30 second sample from Ferris State College Men's Glee Club

The adoption of the new Ferris alma mater song, "Ferris Fidelity" and its first performance under direction of composer Graham T. Overgard were at the Christmas concert in 1957.

== Notable alumni ==
- Norm Augustinus, writer
- Jeff Blashill, professional hockey coach
- Carlton Brewster, professional football player
- Monty Brown, professional football player and professional wrestler
- Trinidad Chambliss, college football player
- Shawn Christian, actor
- John Gruden, professional hockey player
- Zach Hankins, professional basketball player
- Jeff Hephner, actor
- Al Jardine, musician
- Butch Jones, college football coach
- Dave Karpa, professional hockey player
- Dana King, television news anchor
- Jeff Kellogg, professional baseball umpire
- Vennela Kishore, actor
- Chris Kunitz, professional hockey player
- Sparky McEwen, professional football coach
- Harry Melling, professional race car driver
- Stacy Erwin Oakes, politician
- Zach Redmond, professional hockey player
- Blair Riley, professional hockey player
- Andy Roach, professional hockey player
- George Ryan, politician
- Zach Sieler, professional football player
- Tavierre Thomas, professional football player
- Gary Waters, college basketball coach
- Frederick Weston, artist
