= River Landscape (Salomon van Ruysdael) =

Painting by Salomon van Ruysdael

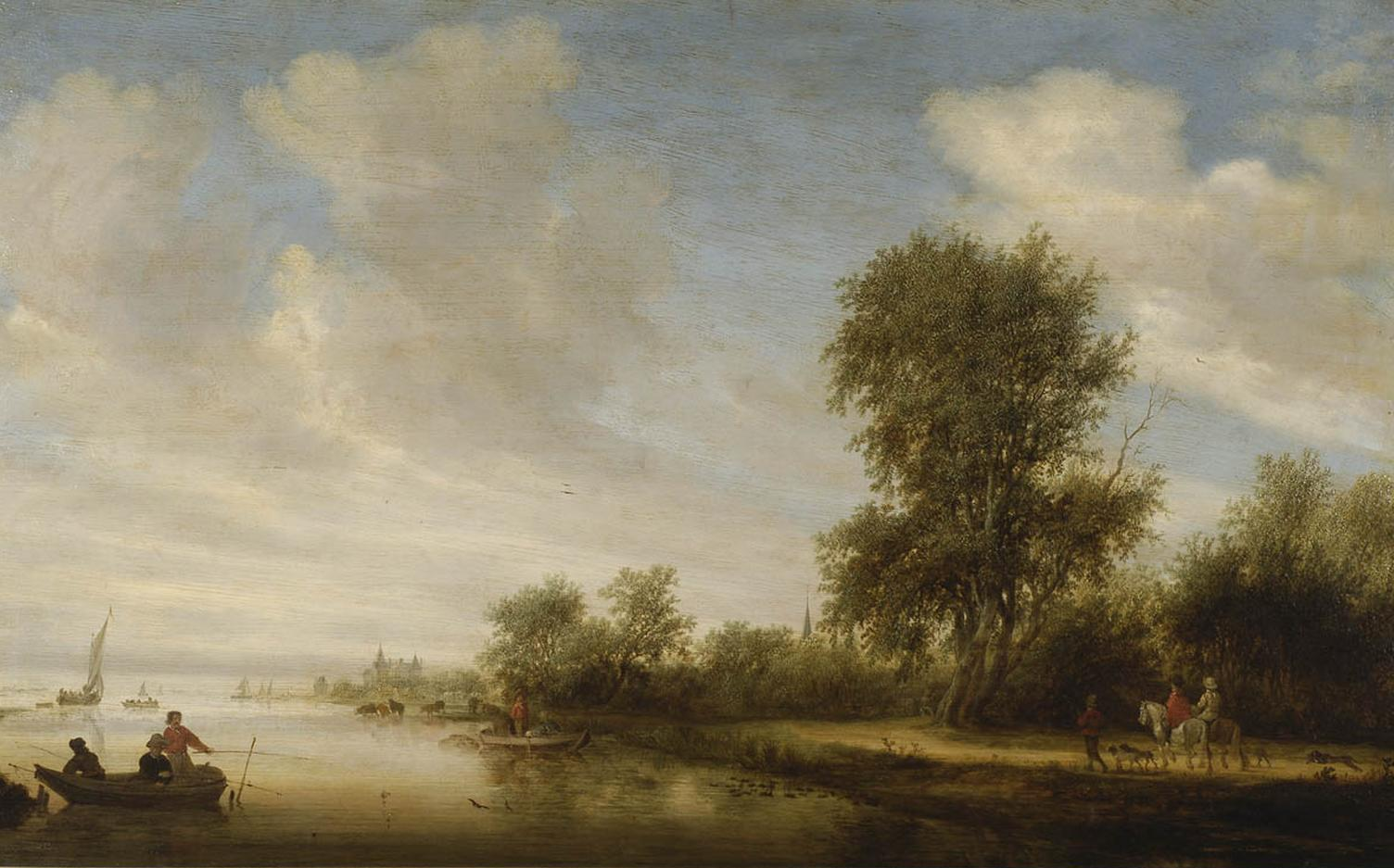
- Artist: Salomon van Ruysdael
- Year: 1642
- Medium: oil painting on panel (oak)
- Movement: Dutch Golden Age painting Landscape painting
- Subject: A riverscape with Muiden Castle in the background
- Dimensions: 52 cm × 83 cm (20 in × 33 in)
- Location: Musée des Beaux-Arts, Strasbourg
- Accession: 1893

River Landscape is a 1642 landscape painting by the Dutch artist Salomon van Ruysdael. It is now in the Musée des Beaux-Arts of Strasbourg, France. Its inventory numbers is 277.

The painting was bought in 1892 by Wilhelm von Bode from the London art dealer Martin Henry Colnaghi and entered the Strasbourg collection the following year. The work is signed and dated, but the date has sometimes been misread as "1622" instead of "1642". Most of the surface of River Landscape is covered by a friendly sky. The landscape below is bustling with life: fishermen, huntsmen, ducks, and drinking cattle. The castle in the background has been identified as Muiden Castle, and the river as the Vecht. Muiden Castle was a center of Dutch cultural life at this time (Muiderkring).
