= Léonard Defrance =

Walloon painter (1735–1805)

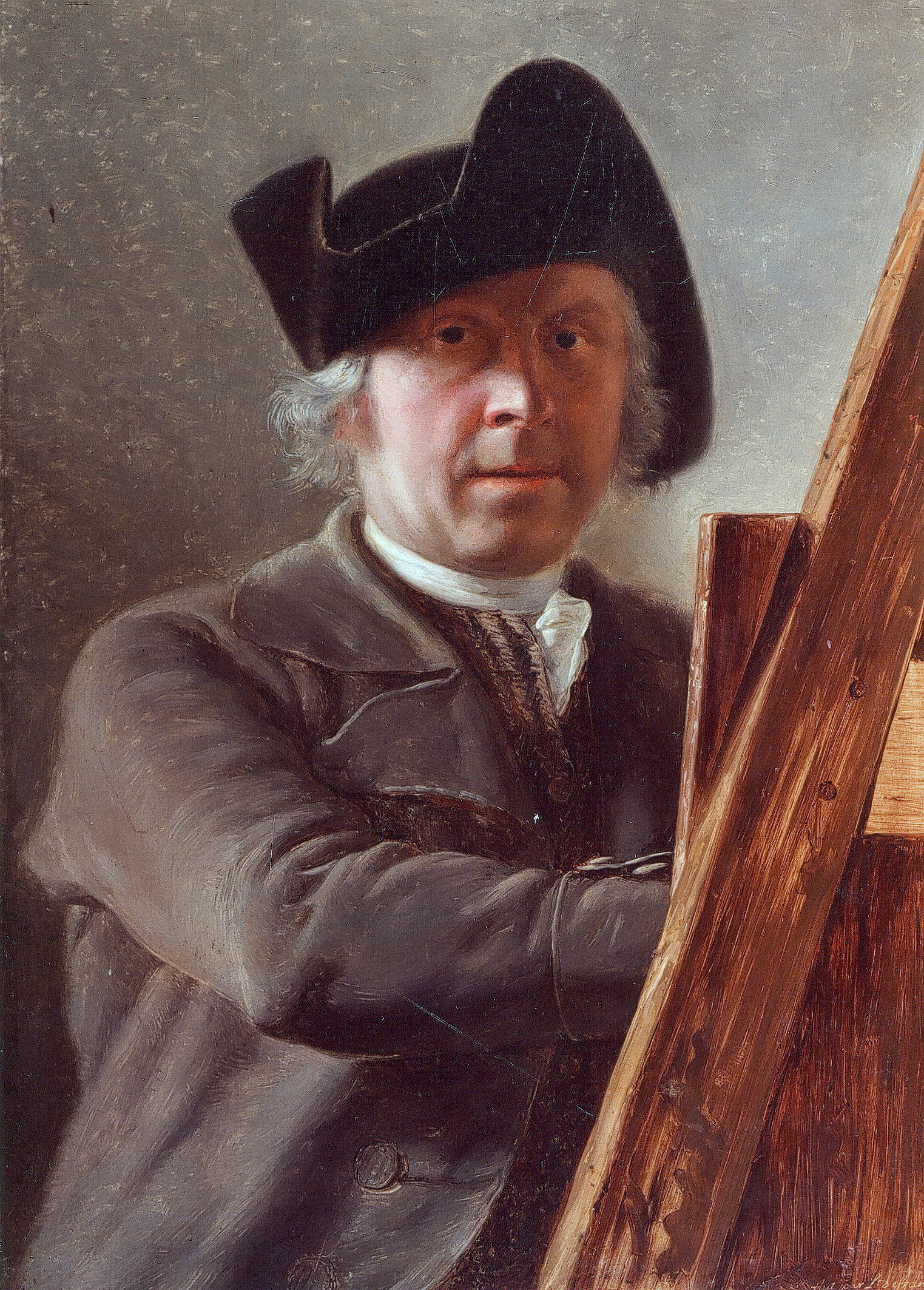
Self-portrait (1791)

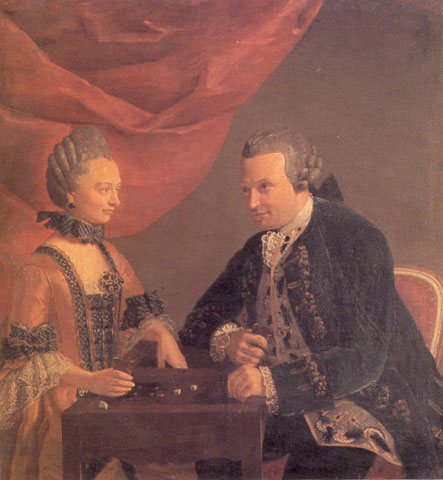
Trictrac players, painting attributed to Defrance

Romantic scene -Leonard Defrance - cm. 40x50 - Private collection E. Canigiani Quarrata (PT) Italy

Romantic scene -Leonard Defrance - cm. 40x50 - Private collection E. Canigiani Quarrata (PT) Italy

Léonard Defrance (French pronunciation: [leɔnaʁ dəfʁɑ̃s]), born at Liège in 1735, was a scholar of J. B. Coclers. He painted historical pieces of large and small dimensions, also landscapes, game, fruit, flowers, and architecture. He was the first professor of design at the Academy of Liège, established by the Prince Velbruck, and afterwards filled the same post in the École Centrale of the department of Ourthe. He died at Liège in 1805.
