= Drawing the Eel =

Painting by Salomon van Ruysdael

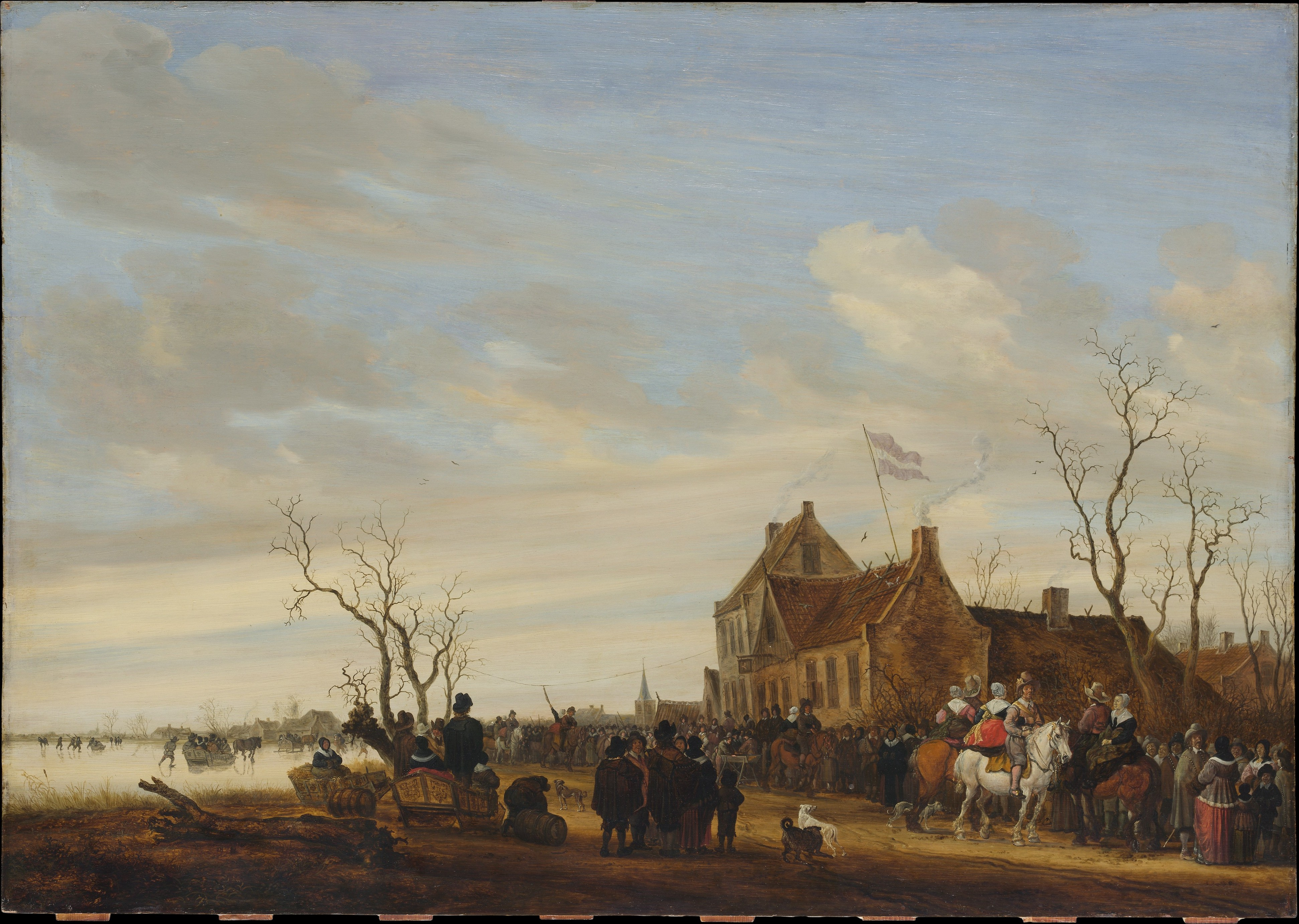
- Artist: Salomon van Ruysdael
- Year: c. 1650
- Medium: Oil on wood
- Dimensions: 74.9 cm × 106 cm (29.5 in × 42 in)
- Location: Metropolitan Museum of Art; New York City
- Accession: 71.75

Drawing the Eel is a mid 17th century painting by Dutch artist Salomon van Ruysdael. Done in oil on wood, the painting depicts a traditional Dutch festival pastime of palingtrekken, translatable to "Eel pulling" or "Eel drawing". Van Ruysdael's work is in the collection of the Metropolitan Museum of Art, and is considered by historian Walter Liedtke to be "One of the finest paintings acquired by the Museum in its founding".

== Description ==
Set in a mid 17th century Dutch village, Drawing the Eel depicts a number of people attending a wintertime festival. The crowd is congregated around a structure (presumed to be an inn), watching children partake in an activity - commonly known as palingtrekken, or eel pulling - in which an eel strung on a line is plucked down by riders passing on horseback. The painting has been remarked upon for its heavy inclusion of the sky (taking up two-thirds of the painting) and for van Ruysdael's excellent use of blue as a color.

The Met acquired Drawing the Eel as part of its foundational art purchase in 1871, just prior to the museum's opening in 1872.
