= Salomon van Ruysdael =

Dutch painter (1602–1670)

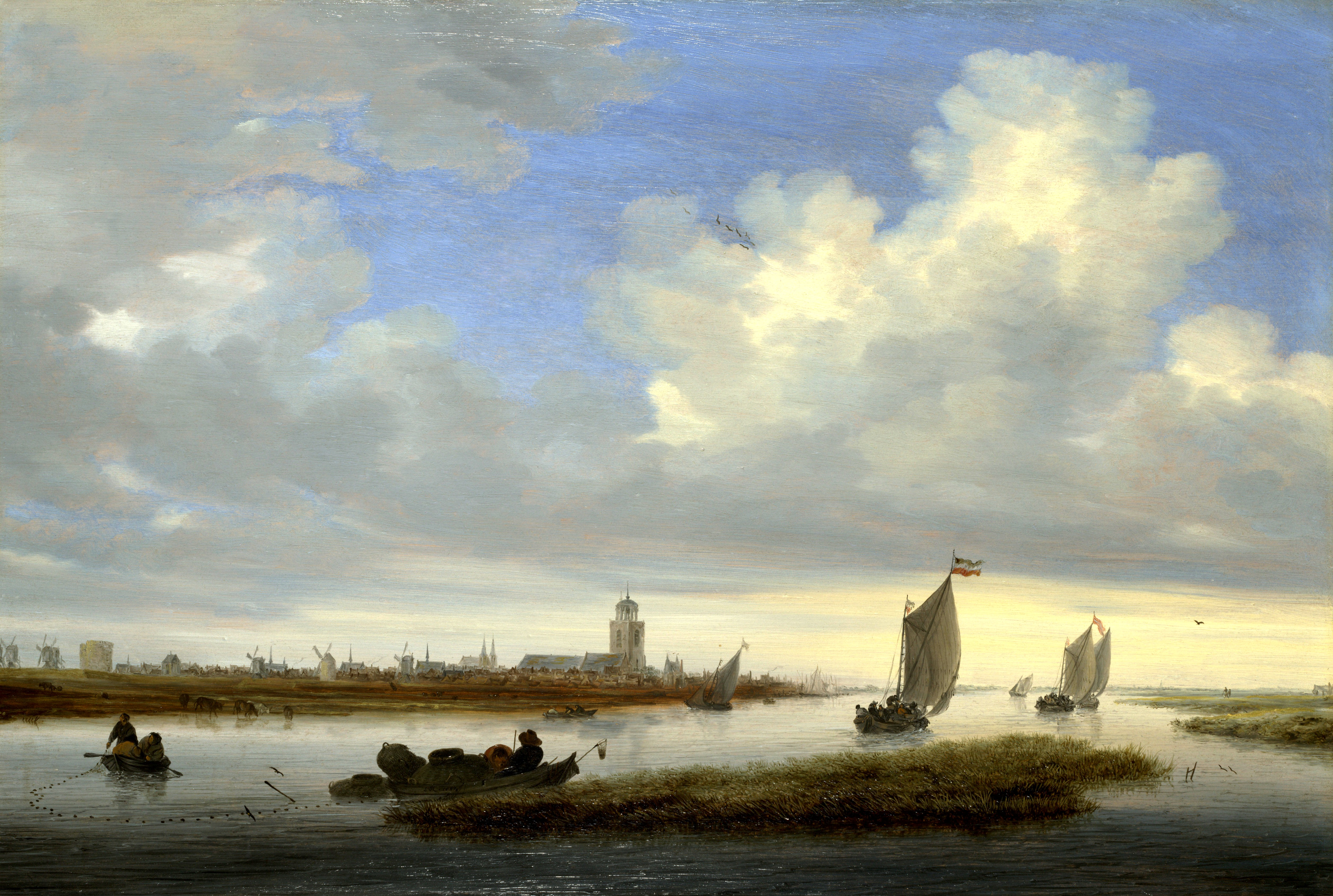
View of Deventer Seen from the North-West by Salomon van Ruysdael (1657) Oil on oak, 52 x 76 cm. National Gallery, London

River Landscape with Ferry by Salomon van Ruysdael (1649) Oil on canvas, 101.5 x 134.8 cm. National Gallery of Art, Washington, D.C.

Landscape with Cornfields by Salomon van Ruysdael. Oil on canvas, 1638, Hallwyl Museum.

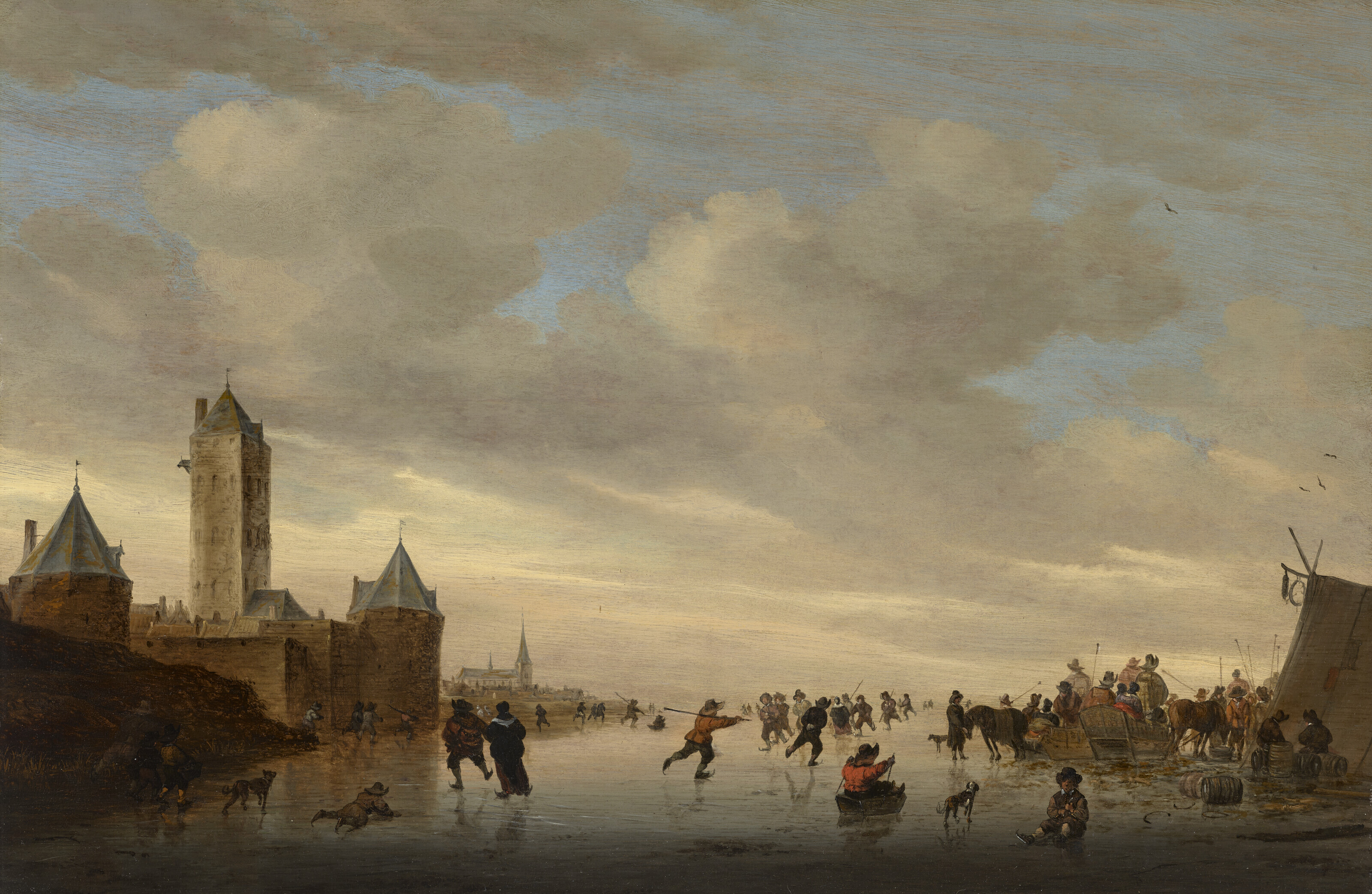
Skaters on a canal near the Plomptoren in Utrecht by Salomon van Ruysdael. Oil on canvas, 1655-1660

Salomon van Ruysdael (c. 1602, Naarden – buried 3 November 1670, Haarlem) was a Dutch Golden Age landscape painter. He was the uncle of Jacob van Ruisdael.

== Biography ==
According to Arnold Houbraken, Ruysdael was the son of a woodworker who specialized in making fancy ebony frames for mirrors and paintings. His father sent his sons, Jacob and Salomon, to learn Latin and medicine, and they both became landscape painters, specializing in ruis-daal, or trickling water through a dale, after their name. Jacob was registered with the Haarlem Guild of St. Luke and signed his paintings, while Salomon signed them much less often and was not a member for several years. Houbraken wrote that Salomon invented a way of creating sculpted ornaments that when they were polished, looked like polished marble. These were quite popular as a decoration on chests and picture frames, until the secret of their manufacture was discovered and widely copied.

Houbraken confused the members of the Ruysdael family. According to the Netherlands Institute for Art History (Dutch abbreviation, RKD), Salomon was the brother of Isaack van Ruisdael, who before they moved to Haarlem, were called Gooyer or Gooier and they were sons of Jacob van Gooyer the Elder, who was a furniture and frame maker in Naarden. Both sons had sons they named after their father. Thus Salomon was the uncle, not the brother of Jacob Isaakszoon van Ruisdael, and he was the father of Jacob Salomonsz van Ruysdael. Salomon joined the Haarlem Guild of St. Luke in 1623 (as Salomon de Gooyer), and he became a follower of Jan Porcellis and Esaias van de Velde. He travelled from Haarlem to Leiden, Utrecht, Amersfoort, Alkmaar, Rhenen, and Dordrecht, painting landscapes and stately homes. Of the four painters, Jacob Isaakszoon is the most famous today.

== Works ==
Salomon was known for his landscapes and river scenes, and there are a few fish still life paintings known. Approximately 20 winter scenes exist including Skaters on a canal near the Plomptoren in Utrecht.

- River Landscape, 1642 (Musée des Beaux-Arts de Strasbourg)
- Ferry near Gorinchem, 1646
- The sale of fish, 1647 (Musée Jeanne d'Aboville)
- Ferry Boat with cattle on the River Vecht near Nijenrode, 1649
- Ferry on a River, 1649
- Drawing the Eel, circa 1650, Metropolitan Museum of Art.
- View of Deventer Seen from the North-West, 1657
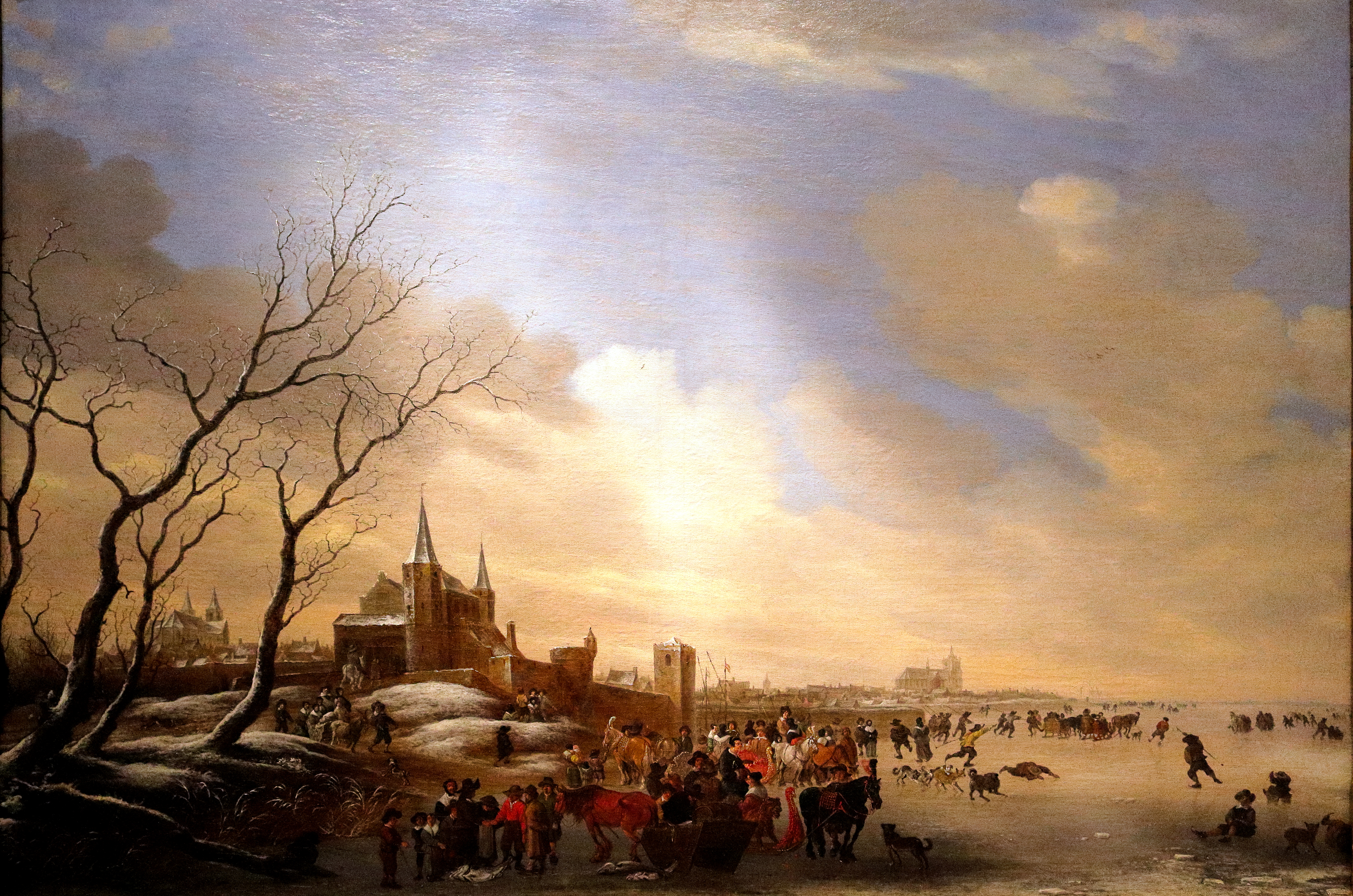
- The sale of fish, 1647
  Skaters on a canal near the Plomptoren in Utrecht, circa 1655-1660.

His paintings have also maintained a sustained presence on the international art market, with works regularly appearing at major auction houses and achieving strong results, reflecting continued scholarly and collector interest in Dutch Golden Age landscape painting.
