= Augustinus Mokoya =

Namibian footballer (born 1977)

Personal information
- Date of birth: 2 June 1977 (age 49)
- Position: Midfielder

Senior career*
Years	Team	Apps	(Gls)
- Chief Santos

International career
1996–2001	Namibia		
- * Club domestic league appearances and goals

Augustinus Mokoya (born 2 June 1977) is a retired Namibian football midfielder.
