= Delia Gaze =

English art historian (born 1951)

- Born: March 1951 (age 75)
- Education: Courtauld Institute of Art
- Occupations: Art historian and editor

Delia Dorothy Gaze FSA (born March 1951) is an English art historian and freelance editor, based in Deptford, south-east London. She is best known for her work as editor of the Dictionary of Women Artists, first published in 1997, containing entries on 550 women painters, sculptors, photographers and workers in the applied arts. The book focuses on Western women artists from the medieval period onwards, and includes essays which place the artists in their historical context.

She has also written biographical entries for the Oxford Dictionary of National Biography. Photographs by Delia Gaze are held in the Conway Library, Courtauld Institute of Art, London, and are currently undergoing a digitisation process as part of the Courtauld Connects project. She has been a Fellow of the Society of Antiquaries of London since March 2017. She has also served as Secretary of the London branch of the Catholic Writers' Guild of England and Wales.

== Publications ==
=== As editor ===
- Dictionary of Women Artists, London: Fitzroy Dearborn, 1997. Later editions of the book, in two volumes, are published by Routledge.
- The Art of Holy Russia: Icons from Moscow, 1400-1660 (with Robin Cormack and Bettina-Martine Wolter), London: Royal Academy of Arts, 1998.
- Bronwen Brown, Understanding Art: A Reference Guide to Painting, Sculpture and Architecture in the Romanesque, Gothic, Renaissance and Baroque Periods (2 vols.), London and Chicago: Fitzroy Dearborn, 1999.
- Concise Dictionary of Women Artists, New York: Routledge, 2001.

=== As contributor ===
- Oxford Dictionary of National Biography, Oxford: Oxford University Press.
