= Norm Augustinus =

American writer

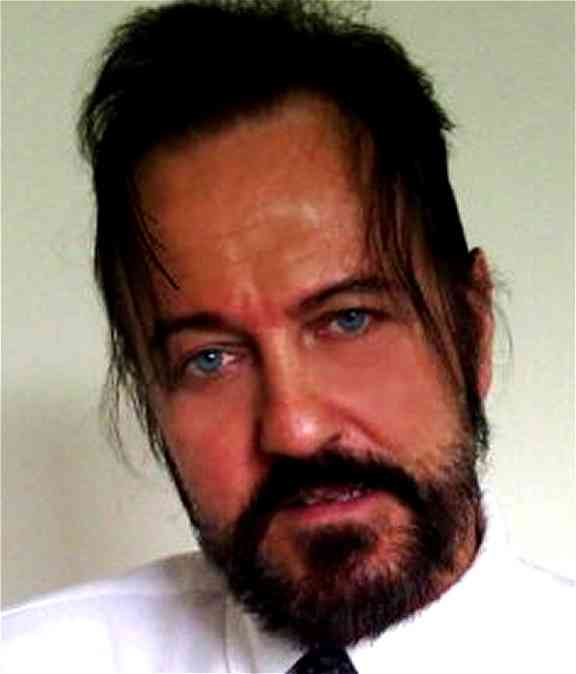
- Augustinus circa 2013
- Born: Detroit, Michigan, United States
- Writing career
- Genre: Comedy
- Notable works: Cats and Dogs

Mountain of Fat by Norm Augustinus
Humorous Fat Cat Adoption Story

Norman Theodoor Augustinus Jr is an American writer.

== Early life ==
Augustinus was born in Detroit, Michigan. He is the son of Levontina Melnyk and Norman Augustinus Sr. His grandfather Bart Theodoor Augustinus was born in Amsterdam, but left the Netherlands in 1922 entering the US by way of the Vermont, St. Albans Canadian Crossing. Augustinus never met his biological father, but at the age of ten his mother remarried.

== Career ==
Norm Augustinus Featured on National TV Show for Flying Saucer/Early Drone Invention.

A writer of humor, Augustinus studied Journalism and Communications at Ferris State University in Big Rapids, Michigan where he was an editor of the university newspaper the (Ferris Torch) and writer/producer of the radio show, The Adventures of E-Man. While a freshman at Ferris State University Augustinus published LEONARD. During his senior year at Ferris State University Augustinus placed in an invention contest and won a cash award for a mailbox transmitter device. A certificate and cash prize was presented to Augustinus during the dedication and open house of the Manufacturing Resource and Productivity Center.

An inventor, his gadgets have been featured in publications and television shows.

Augustinus' 'iPhone Colon Exam' invention/video was cited on the patent by Patrick O'Neil, the inventor of the iPhone olloclip which has sold over 1.5 million units worldwide.

He has been a copywriter, run for political office, and appeared in over three dozen television commercials. In 1991, Augustinus developed the story-line and dialogue for place mats used in over 300 McDonald's restaurants throughout Michigan, The Adventures of Tizzie Bean. Additionally, Augustinus landed a bit part (under five lines) in the movie Hoffa starring Jack Nicholson (Shot in Cobo Hall Arena, Detroit). Augustinus is listed in the 2003 & 2004 Edition of Marquis Who's Who in America and was nominated for the Ferris State University Distinguished Alumni Award two consecutive years in a row. In 1999, he was accepted into the Powerhouse Theatre Program at Vassar College in Poughkeepsie, New York. He has written for newspapers and online publications such as McSweeney's Internet Tendency.

In March 2013, Roll Call published a story about an animated cartoon Augustinus created and posted on his website with regards to the Obama administration. The cartoon depicted several high-ranking members of the Obama administration being laser beamed into nonexistence by a drone. The cartoon, and subsequent claims by the artist that he was emailed by the United States Secret Service, prompted a visit from them.

In 2014 and 2015, Augustinus protested near Columbus Circle Manhattan holding large, worded banners in support of the New York City horse carriage industry, which Bill de Blasio vowed to end immediately upon being elected NYC mayor. Augustinus was one of the people thanked by the Teamsters for his support in a full page notice/ad published in the New York Daily News on January 1, 2016.

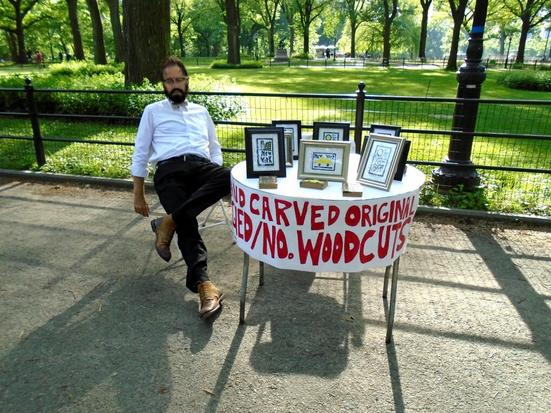
Norm Augustinus Selling His Art in Central Park.

== Personal life ==
Augustinus writes daily and performs his stand-up comedy routine regularly. He has written two novels, Cats and Dogs was published on March 10, 2017, and Bedbadger was released January 21, 2013.

On August 26, 2015, while driving through Michigan, Augustinus saw a Jeep Cherokee lose control and roll over several times off I-75. Augustinus ran to the car and pulled two children from the smoking, overturned vehicle. Augustinus was nominated for the Carnegie Hero Medal for his heroic act.
