= Augustinus-Verein =

19th-century German Catholic press association

The Augustinus-Verein was an association organized in 1878 to promote the interests of the Catholic press, particularly the daily press, of Germany. The society proposed to attain its end

- by giving its moral support to the establishment of Catholic newspapers;
- by furnishing trustworthy information and authentic news to the daily papers;
- by training Catholic journalists, and giving assistance to the members of the profession in need of it;
- by representing the interests of the profession;
- by securing positions and giving information and assistance in all matters connected with journalism, free of charge and finally
- by endeavouring to bring about the harmonious co-operation of Catholic publishers, as well as uniformity in treating the questions of the day.

The lack of organization on the part of the Catholic press first became obvious at an early stage of the Kulturkampf; several unsuccessful attempts were made to supply the deficiency, among others the formation of a society of publishers. The first feasible steps were taken at the Catholic Convention at Würzburg; at subsequent gatherings plans were matured, and at Düsseldorf, 15 May 1878, a programme was drawn up which is substantially followed out in the present Augustinus-Verein, Düsseldorf became the centre of the Verein, which, having spread throughout Germany, was divided into ten groups, corresponding to geographical divisions, each, to a large extent autonomous. A general assembly was held annually. The Verein had its own organ, the Augustinusblatt, published at Krefeld. It also conducted a literary bureau, a beneficial society, a parliamentary correspondence association of the Centre Party, in Berlin, and an employment agency. In 1904 the society had a regular membership of 850, in addition to the associate membership.
