= Margaretha Haverman =

Dutch artist (1693–after 1739)

Margaretha Haverman (bapt. 28 October 1693 – after 1739) was an 18th-century flower painter from the Dutch Republic.

== Biography ==
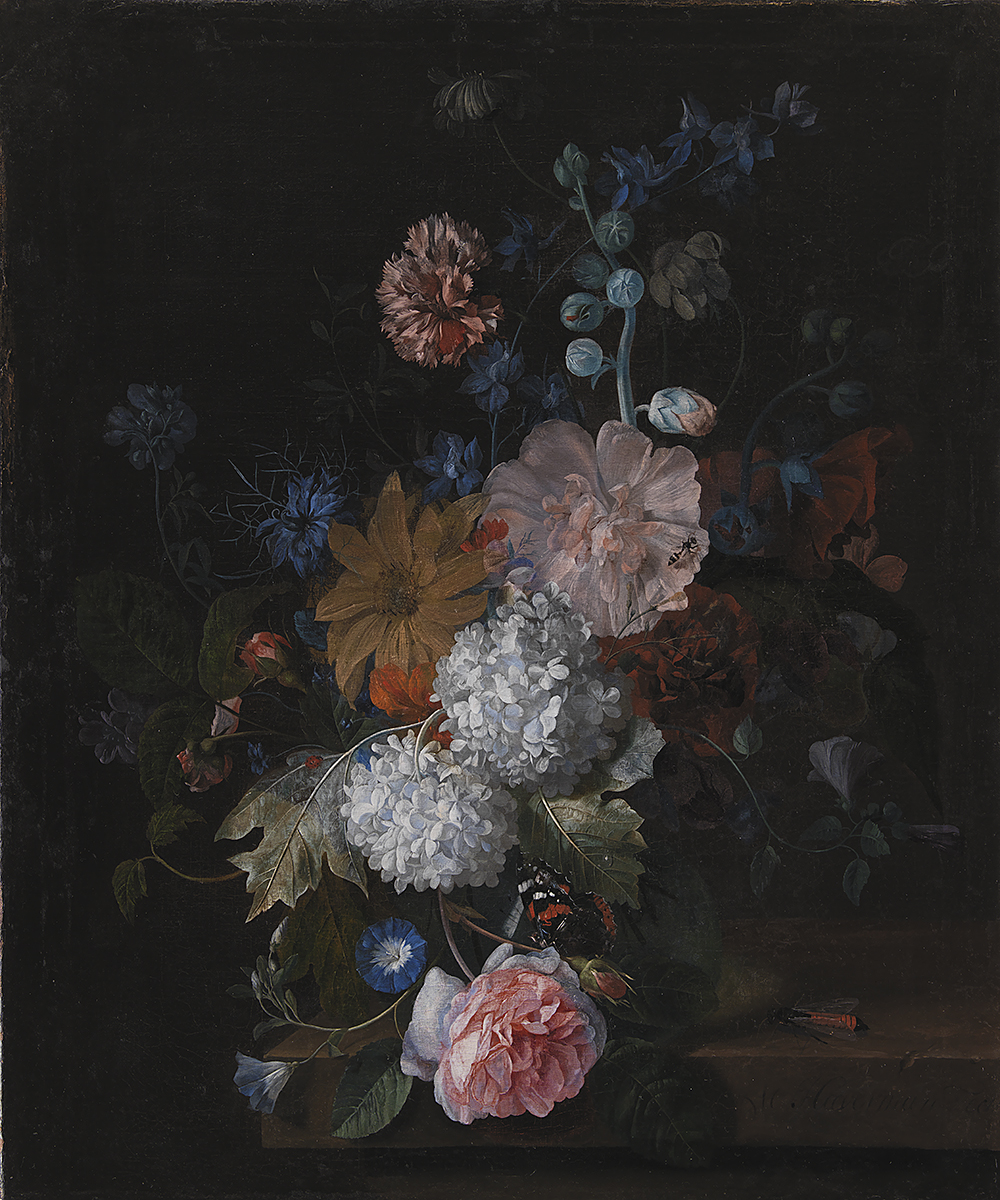
Flower still life on a stone slab with butterfly and other insects

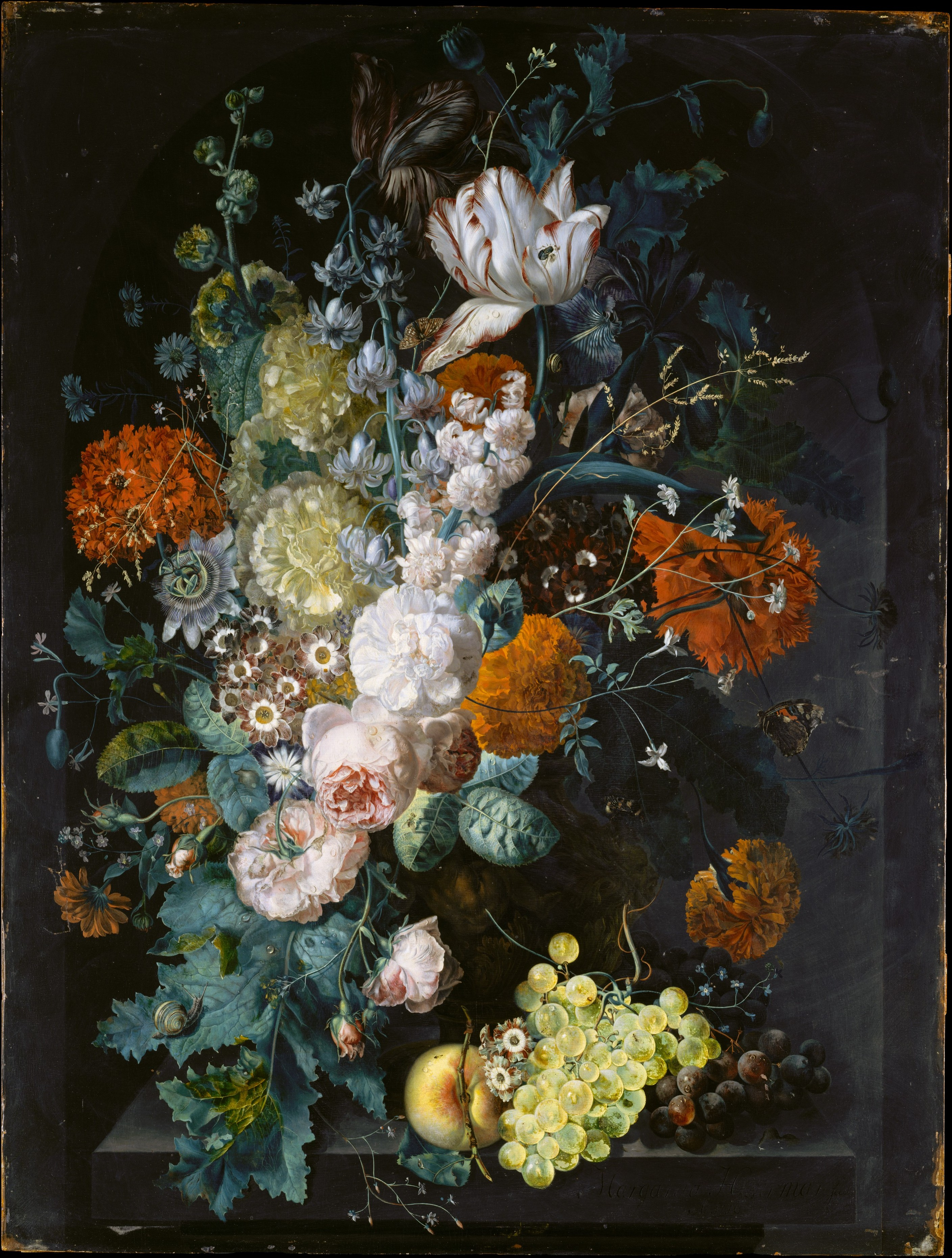
A Vase of Flowers (1716)

She was born in Breda as the daughter of Daniël Haverman, a captain in the Danish army who settled in Amsterdam to become director of a boys' school there.

In the 20 page biography of Jan van Huysum written by Jan van Gool, the only woman he mentioned is Haverman who Van Gool claimed had been allowed to become Van Huysum's only pupil. Van Huysum later believed she became his pupil under false pretenses and that he had been "sweet-talked" into taking her on by her father the schoolmaster. Haverman became an embarrassment to Van Huysum when she was admitted to the prestigious Académie royale de peinture et de sculpture in 1722, because she began to sell her works and he was very defensive of his own public image and he was afraid her clever copies would bring him discredit. This story indicates that Van Huysum was willing to let his female relatives assist him but avoided the help of male pupils for fear of revealing his technique.

Though her work is regularly mentioned in estate inventories, today only two signed flower paintings by her are known, A Vase of Flowers (1716) is in the Metropolitan Museum of Art and the other in the Statens Museum for Kunst.

Margaretha Haverman married 25 July 1721 the architect Jacques de Mondoteguy (d. 1739) in Amsterdam, with whom she moved to Paris, where she was accepted as a member in the Academie the next year. In 1723 she was thrown out again after claims that her acceptance work was in fact the work of her former master Van Huysum.
