= Augustinus Hellemans =

Belgian footballer (1907–1992)

Personal information
- Date of birth: 4 September 1907
- Date of death: 25 December 1998 (aged 91)

International career
Years	Team	Apps	(Gls)
1931	Belgium	2	(2)

Augustinus Hellemans (14 September 1907 – 30 April 1992) was a Belgian footballer. He played in two matches for the Belgium national football team in 1931.
