= Josephus Augustinus Brentano =

Dutch art collector (1753–1821)

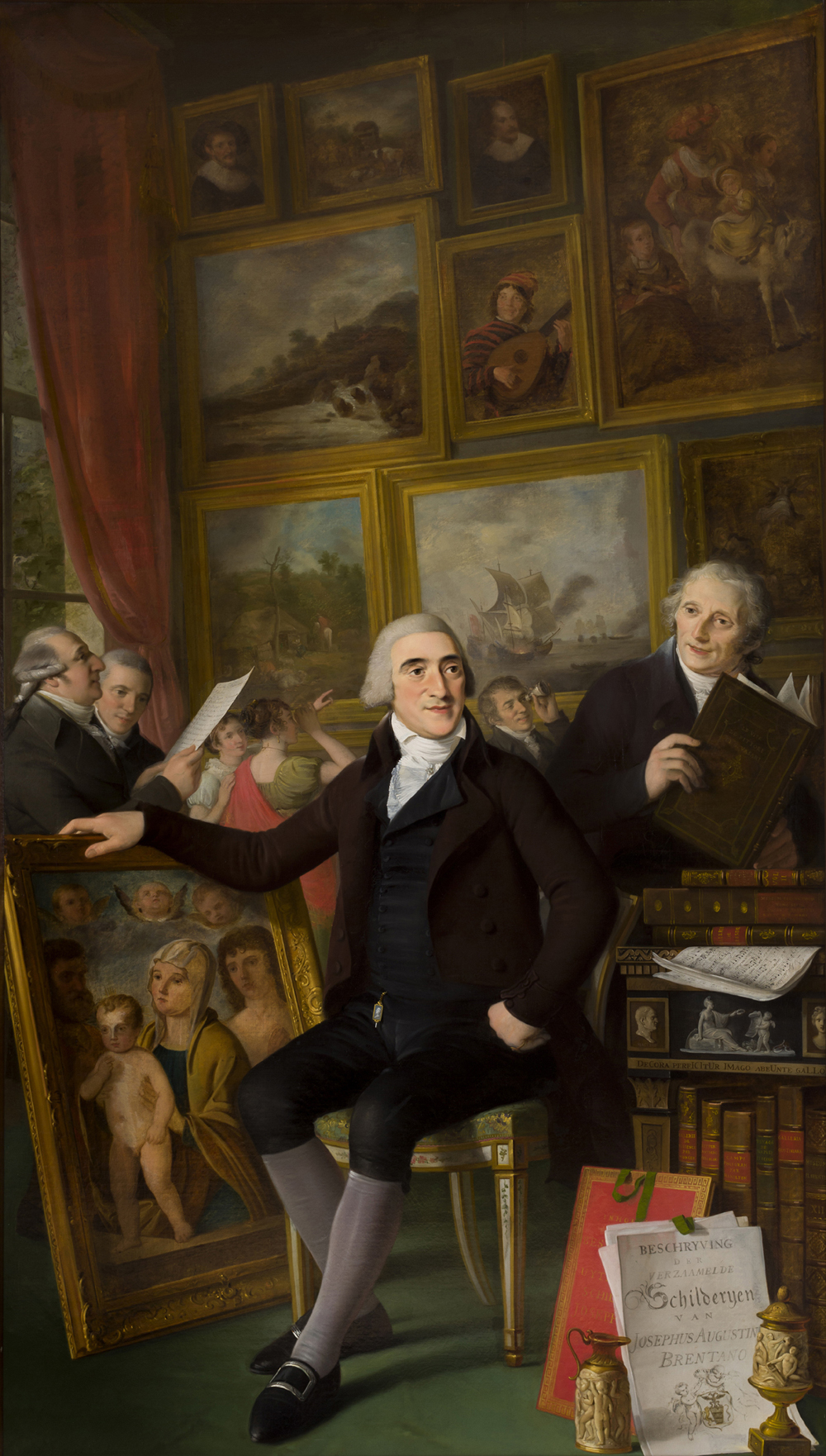
- J. A. Brentano by Adriaan de Lelie, 1813
- Born: 28 August 1753; Amsterdam
- Died: 16 April 1821 (aged 67); Amsterdam

Josephus Augustinus Brentano (1753 – 1821) was a Dutch art collector.

Brentano was born in Amsterdam and became a merchant in trade with the VOC and the WIC. He was not unsuccessful and retired early in a canal mansion on the Herengracht (today nr. 544). He formed a large art cabinet there that competed with the one formed by Jan Gildemeester further down the canal. Like Gildemeester, he hired Adriaan de Lelie to portray him among his prize paintings. He started the collection to encourage artists in their field, according to Roeland van Eynden and Adriaan van der Willigen.

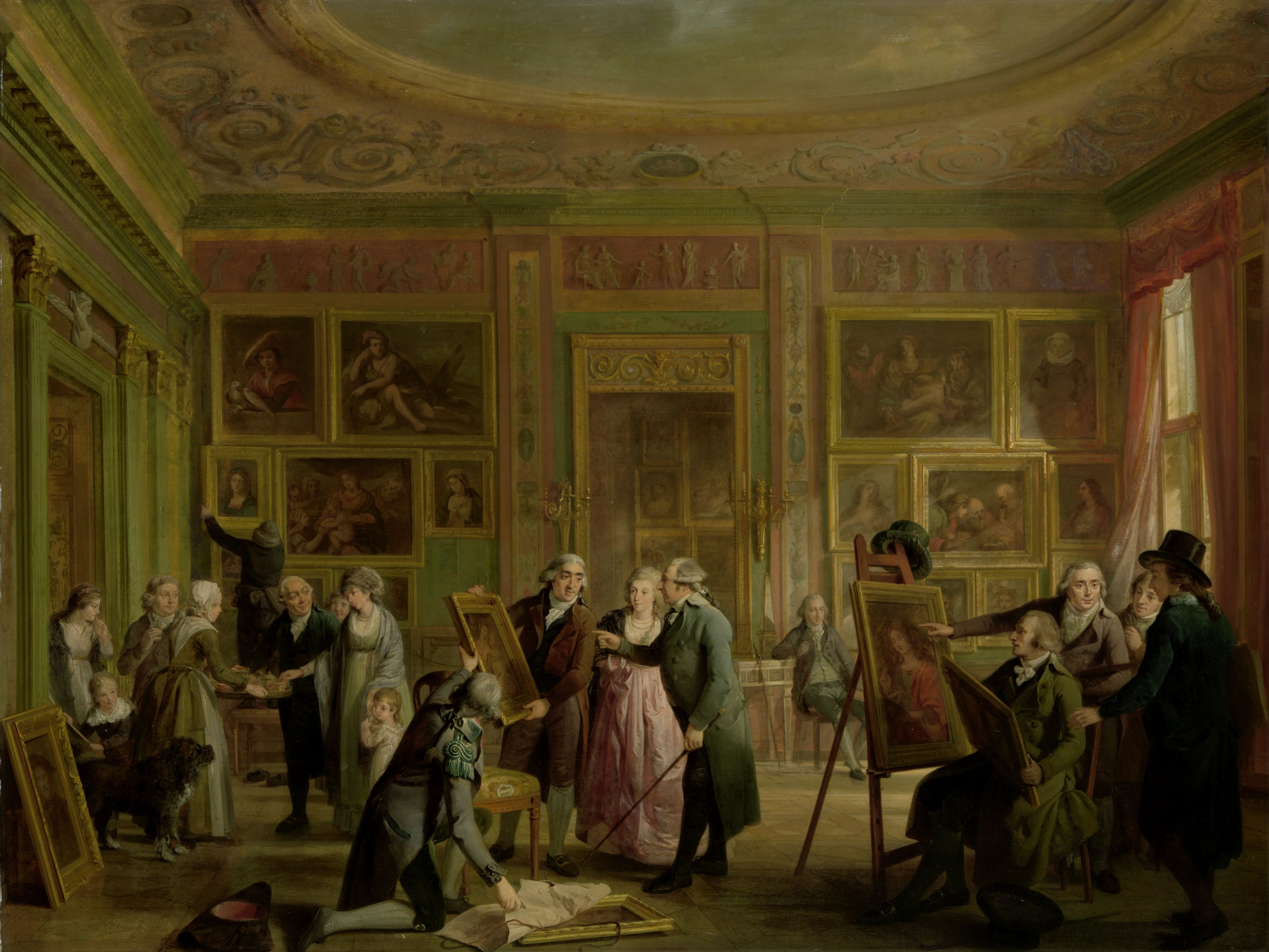
Brentano in his art cabinet

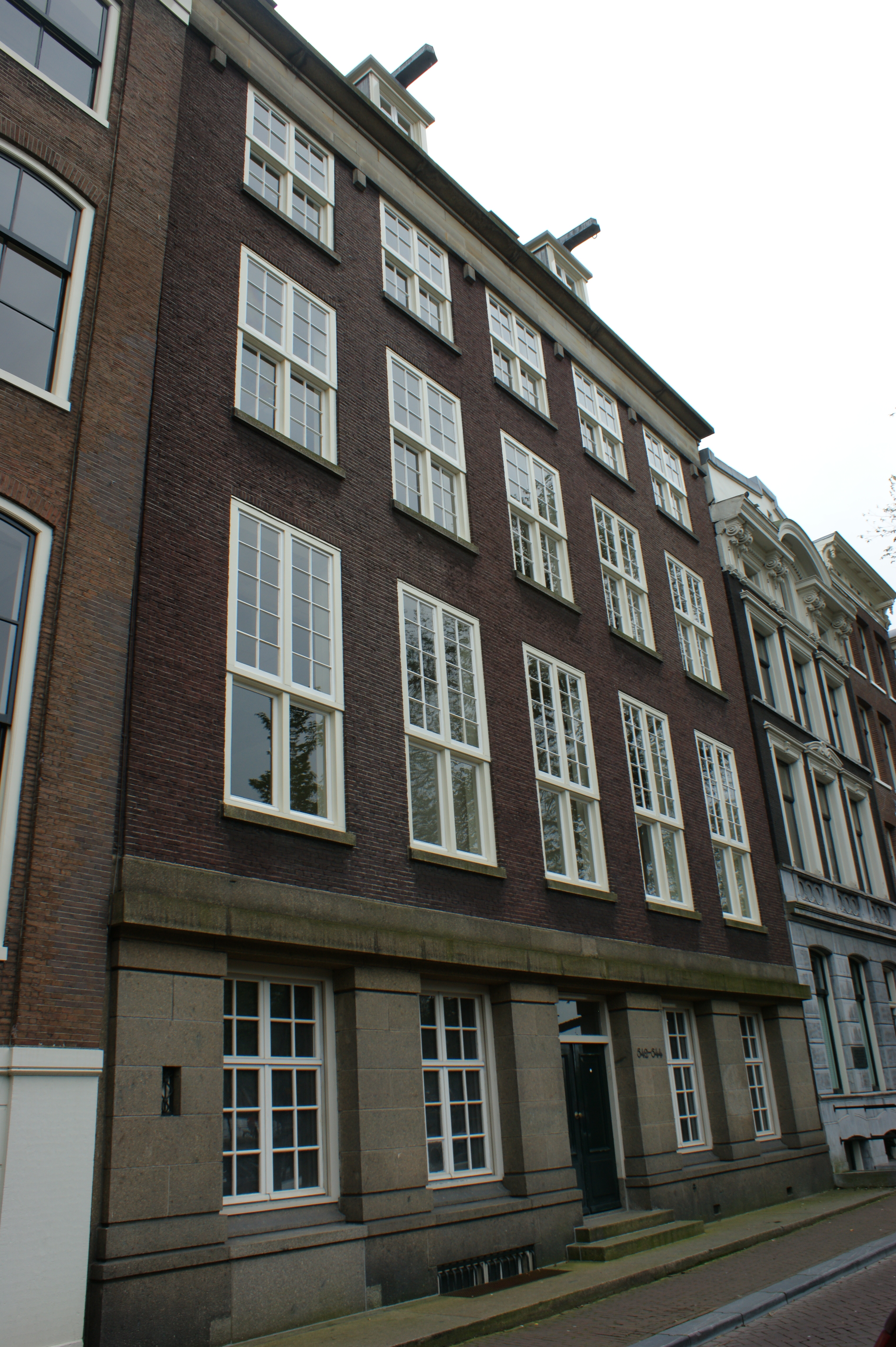
Location of his canal mansion today

Brentano died a bachelor in Amsterdam and his collection was sold to found Brentano's Steun des Ouderdoms a home for poor elderly men.
