= List of paintings by Rachel Ruysch =

The following is a list of works by Rachel Ruysch that are generally accepted as autograph by the Netherlands Institute for Art History and other sources.

Image	Title	Year	Size	Inventory nr.	Gallery	Location
	Insects and a lizard in a wood	ca. 1684	59.6 cm x 48.2 cm	PD.87-1973	Fitzwilliam Museum	Cambridge
	Flowers around a tree trunk, with insects and other animals near a pond	1686	93 cm x 74 cm	GK 450	Museum Schloss Wilhelmshöhe	Kassel
	Roses, Convolvulus, Poppies, and Other Flowers in an Urn on a Stone Ledge	ca. 1688		186.282	National Museum of Women in the Arts	Washington D.C.
	Flowers in a glass vase on a balustrade with colunnade	1689		79:25	San Diego Museum of Art	San Diego, CA
	Spray of flowers with insects and butterflies on a marble slab	1690s	36.6 cm x 30.4 cm	PD.38-1975	Fitzwilliam Museum	Cambridge
	Posy of flowers, with a red admiral butterfly, on a marble ledge	ca. 1695	34.5 cm x 27.3 cm		Private collection	London
	Flowers in a vase	1698	57 cm x 43.5 cm	NG 6425	National Gallery	London
	Flowers in a glass vase, with a cricket in a niche	1700	79.5 cm x 60.2 cm	151	Mauritshuis	The Hague
	Flowers in a terracotta vase with fruit on a stone balustrade	ca. 1700	99 cm x 83 cm	PD.88-1973	Fitzwilliam Museum	Cambridge
	Flowers in a glass vase, with insects and peaches, on a marble tabletop	1701	77 cm x 63.5 cm	PD.85-1973	Fitzwilliam Museum	Cambridge
	Flowers in a glass vase, on a stone table	1701	76.9 cm x 63.5 cm	PD.86-1973	Fitzwilliam Museum	Cambridge
	Flowerpiece with prunes	1703	84 cm x 68 cm	664	Academy of Fine Arts Vienna	Vienna
	Flowers in a glass vase on a marble table	1704	83.8 cm x 67.0 cm	1995.67	Detroit Institute of Arts	Detroit
	Roses, tulips, ranunculus and other flowers in a glass vase, with plums	1704	92 cm x 70 cm	2751	Royal Museums of Fine Arts of Belgium	Brussels
	Flowers in a glass vase, with peaches and red berries, on a marble slab	1706	100 cm x 81 cm	GG 572	Kunsthistorisches Museum	Vienna
	Flowers in a glass vase, with fruit on a marble slab	1707		1563	Museum der bildenden Künste	Leipzig
	Still life of flowers	1708	92.3 cm × 70.2 cm	430	Staatsgalerie im Neuen Schloss Bayreuth	Bayreuth
	Tulips and other flowers in a glass vase	ca. 1709	65.5 cm x 52 cm	SK-A-354	Rijksmuseum	Amsterdam
	Roses, tulips and other flowers in a glass vase on a marble ledge	1709	78 cm x 64 cm		Private collection	
	Still life with fruit a nest and a lizard	1710			Private collection	New York City
	Flowers in a glass vase with a dragonfly, on a marble slab	1710		B 407	Schloss Fasanerie	Eichenzell, Fulda
	Flowers in a glass vase on a marble slab	ca. 1710	77.5 cm x 62.3 cm	1899.1.26	The Wilson	Cheltenham
	Still life of fruits, animals and insects on a moss floor	1711	46.2 cm x 61.6 cm	1276 (1890)	Uffizi	Florence
	Basket of Flowers	1711	46.2 cm x 61.6 cm	1285 (1890)	Uffizi	Florence
	Flower still life	1715	75 cm x 60.3 cm	878	Alte Pinakothek	Munich
	Portrait of Juriaen Pool II (....-1745), Rachel Ruysch (1664-1750) and their son Jan Willem Pool	1716	71 cm x 62.5 cm		Stadtmuseum Düsseldorf	Düsseldorf
	Flowers in a glass vase, with pomegranates, on a marble balustrade	1716	89.5 cm x 67.5 cm	455 (Gall. Palatina 1912)	Palazzo Pitti	Florence
	Flowers, fruit, reptiles, and insects on the edge of a wood	1716	89 cm x 68.5 cm	451 (Gall. Palatina 1912)	Palazzo Pitti	Florence
	Still life with flowers on a marble slab	1716	48.5 cm x 39.5 cm	SK-A-2338	Rijksmuseum	Amsterdam
	Fruit, a nest and insects in a wood	1717	65.2 cm x 54.5 cm	377	Staatliche Kunsthalle Karlsruhe	Karlsruhe
	Spray of flowers, with a beetle on a stone balustrade	1741	20 cm x 24.5 cm	1100	Kunstmuseum Basel	Basel
	Flower still life	1742	45.1 cm x 39.1 cm		Private collection	
	Flower bouquet on a marble table	1746			Kurpfälzisches Museum der Stadt Heidelberg	Heidelberg
	Flower still life		75 cm x 58.5 cm	LSH DIG4506	Hallwyl Museum	Stockholm

== Sources ==
- Rachel Ruysch in the RKD
