= Still Life with Flowers on a Marble Slab =

Painting by Rachel Ruysch

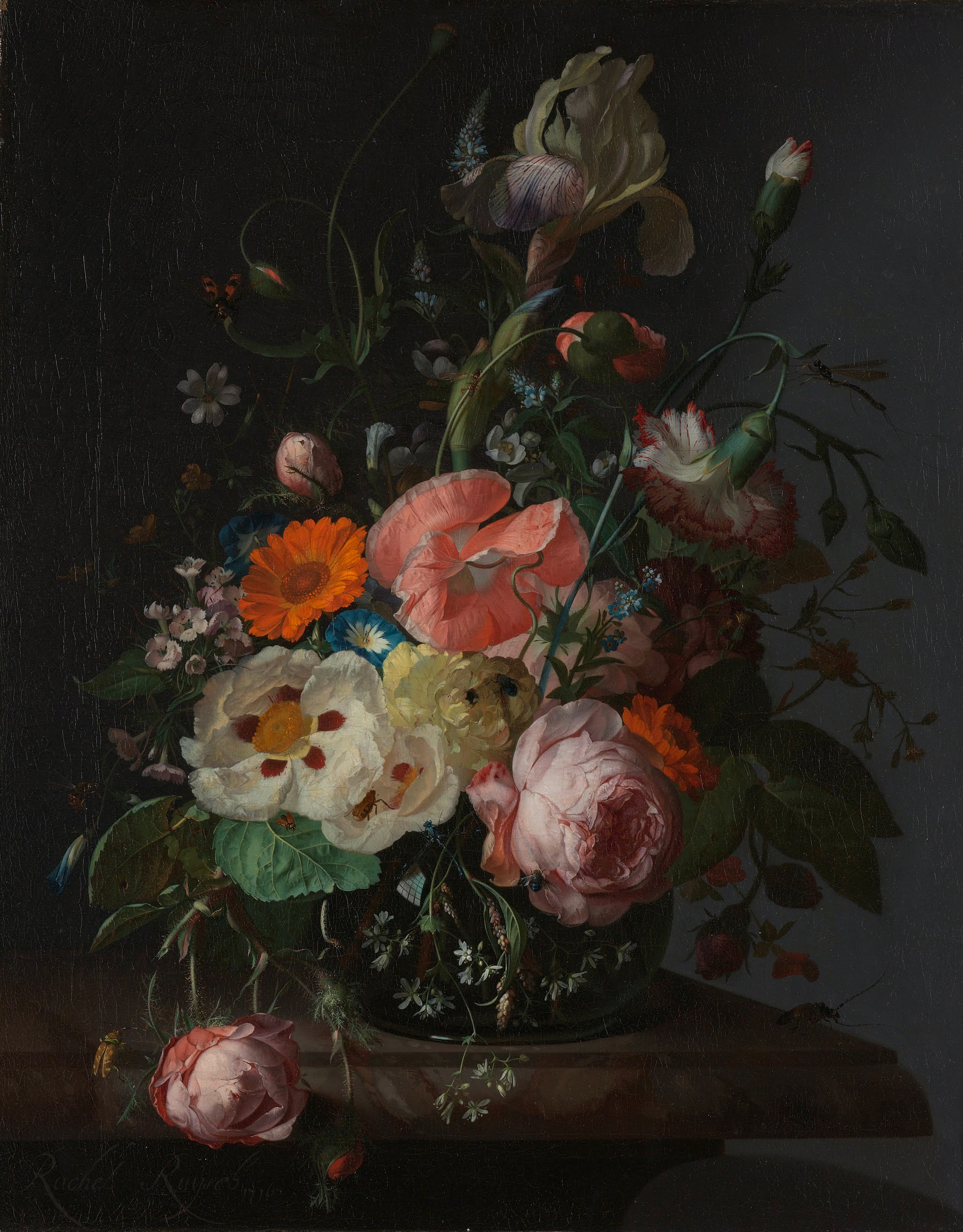
- Artist: Rachel Ruysch
- Year: 1716
- Medium: canvas, oil paint
- Dimensions: 48.5 cm (19.1 in) × 39.5 cm (15.6 in)
- Location: Rijksmuseum, Netherlands
- Accession no.: SK-A-2338
- Identifiers: RKDimages ID: 193049

Still Life with Flowers on a Marble Slab is a 1716 floral painting by Rachel Ruysch. It is in the collection of the Rijksmuseum, in Amsterdam.

== Early history and creation ==
This painting is signed and dated 1716, which means it was painted near the end of Ruysch's time as court painter to Johann Wilhelm, Elector Palatine who died that year. Ruysch was then at the peak of her fame and her works sold for large sums in her lifetime. Though the sum paid for this one is unknown, it is known from the study of 17th-century estate inventories that a painting by her hand was worth more than a Rembrandt or a painting by her husband, the portrait painter Jurriaen Pool.

== Description ==
The work shows various insects as well as flowers. The identified blooms and bugs are: Cistus, poppy, Viola × wittrockiana, Calendula, Calystegia, Dianthus caryophyllus, Rosa, Green bottle fly, Bee beetle, wasp, damselfly, burying beetle, Dianthus barbatus, Saxifragella, Iris.

== Later history and influence ==
Rachel Ruysch had many followers. At some point in the 18th-century, this painting was copied, and the copy is kept at the Ashmolean museum. A well-documented copyist of Ruysch's works was the Dutch painter Catharina Backer, who also owned two of Ruysch's paired large canvases, commissioned by her father-in-law, the art collector Pieter de la Court van der Voort, in 1710. It is tempting to think this painting was also in her collection. It was certainly in the collection of another wealthy Dutch woman art collector of note, Lucretia Johanna van Winter, who purchased a painting by Ruysch in 1820 and who when she married, brought a collection of 171 paintings (76 she bought herself). She died in 1845 and after her husband died, her son Pieter Hendrik Six van Vromade sold it in 1908 along with 38 others to the Rijksmuseum. The most notable paintings that Lucretia Johanna had bought in that group of paintings besides this one, were Vermeer's Milkmaid and Judith Leyster's Serenade (which had been in the collection as a Frans Hals until 1893).

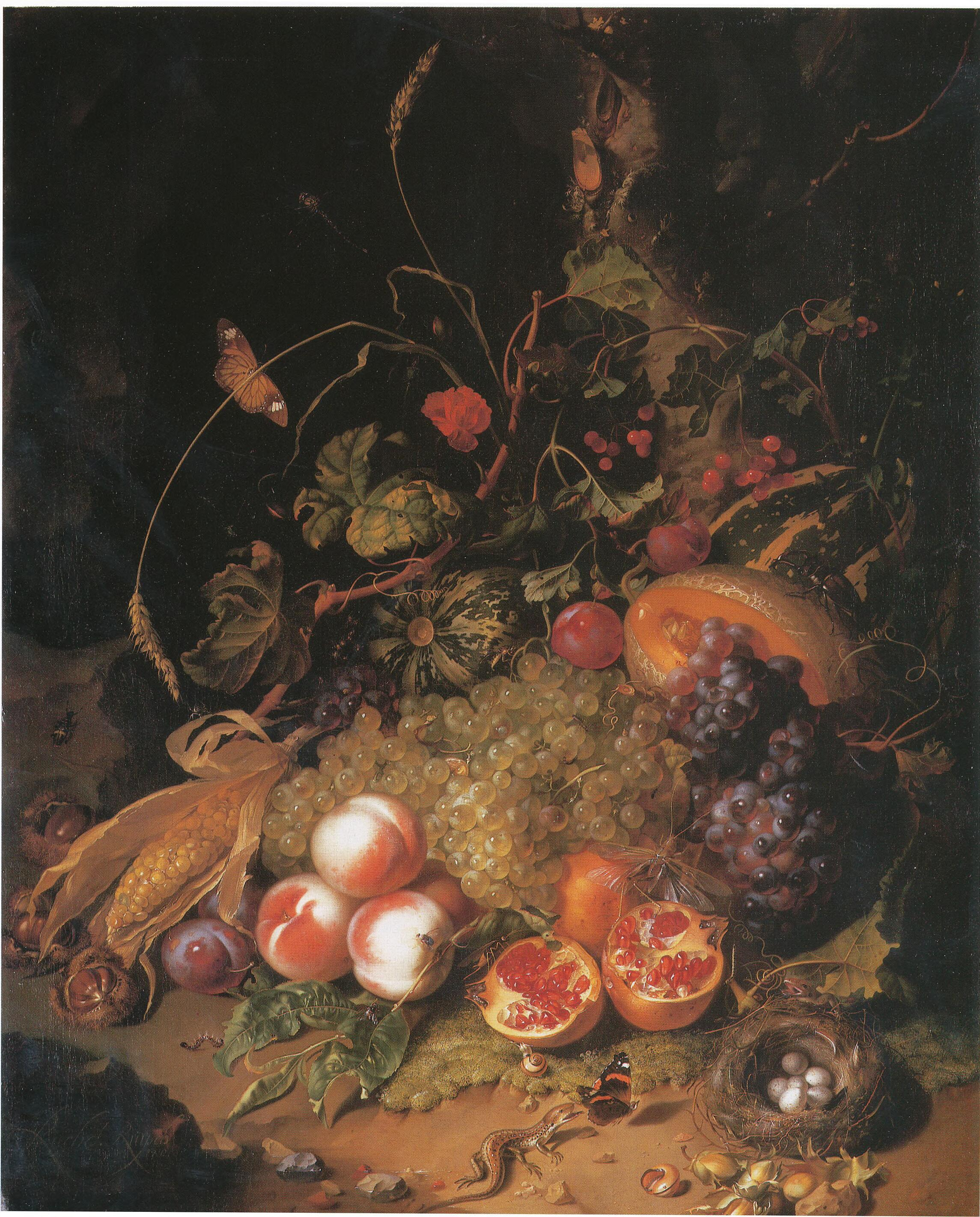
Still Life with fruit and a lizard, 1710

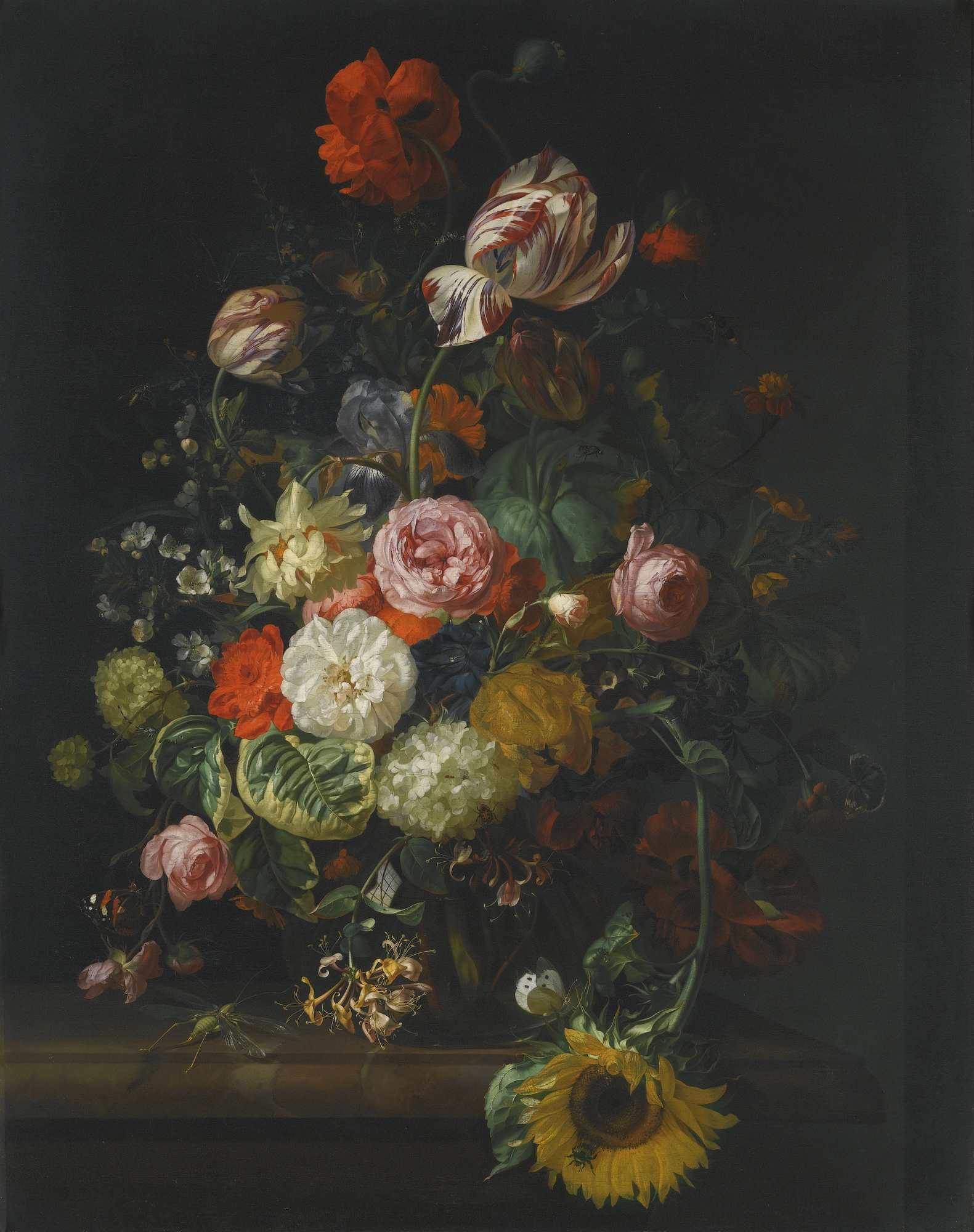
Still Life with flowers, 1710

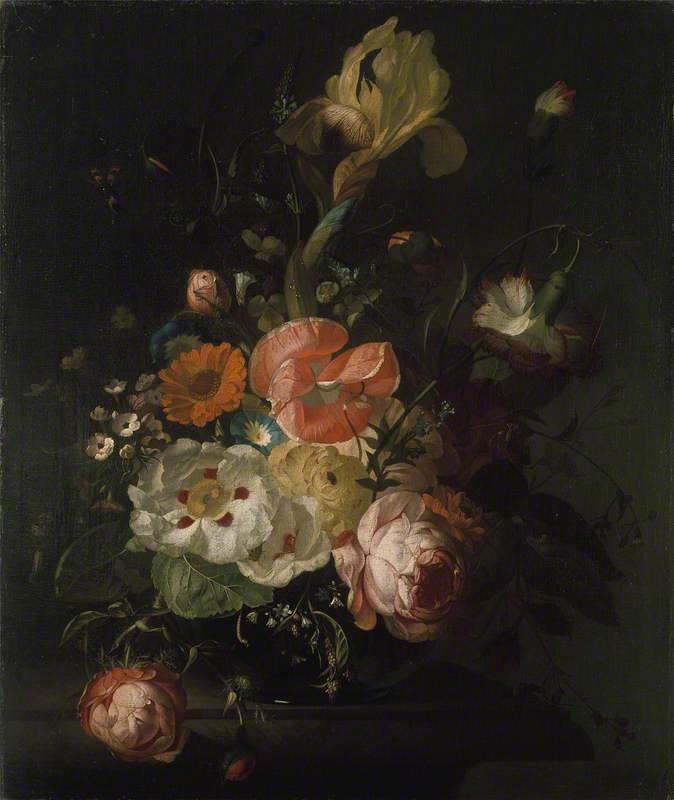
Copy of this painting in the Ashmolean
