= Catharina Backer =

Dutch artist (1689–1766)

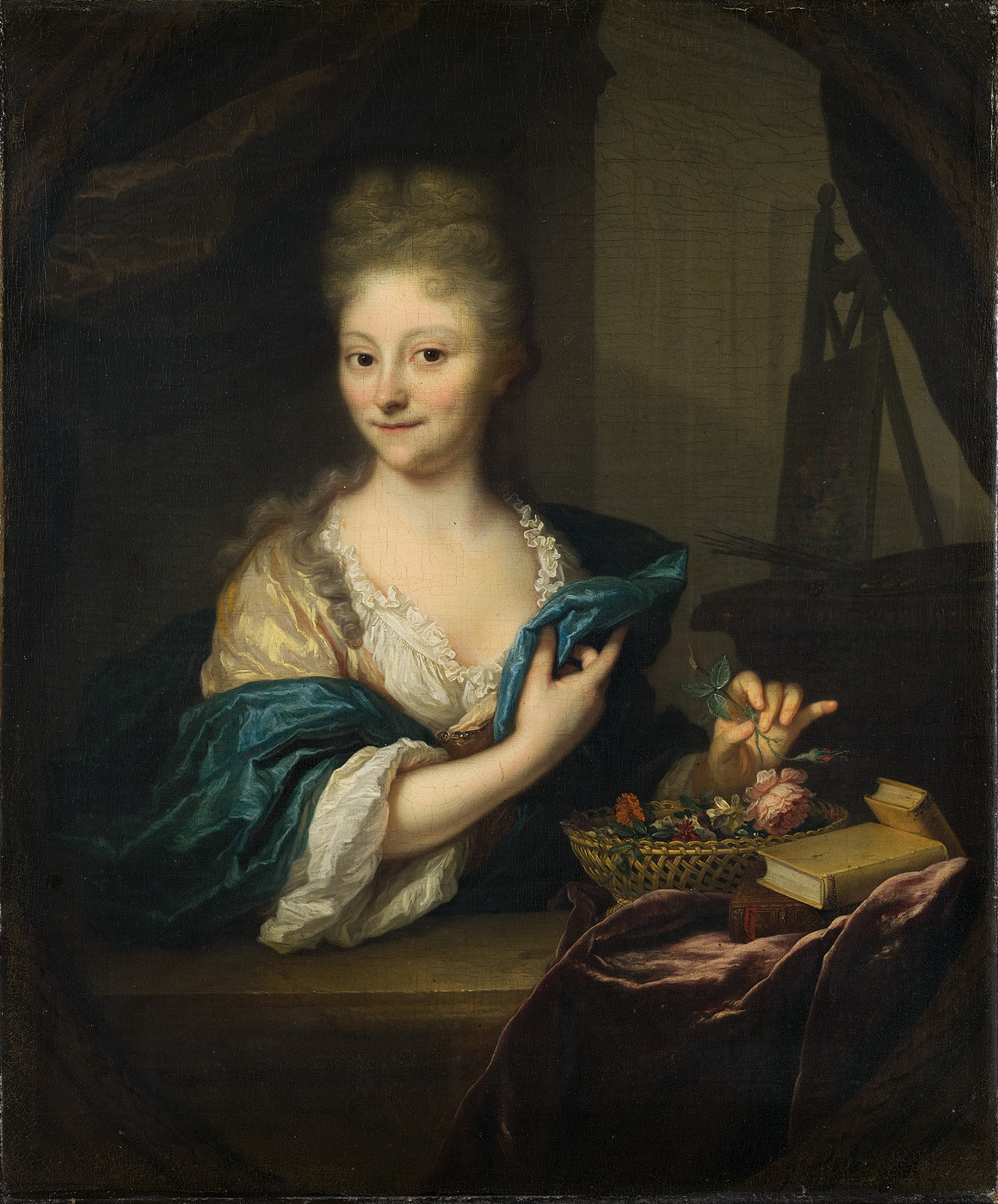
- Born: 22 September 1689; Amsterdam
- Died: 8 February 1766 (aged 76); Leiden

Catharina Backer (22 September 1689 – 8 February 1766) was an art collector and an 18th-century painter from the Dutch Republic.

== Biography ==
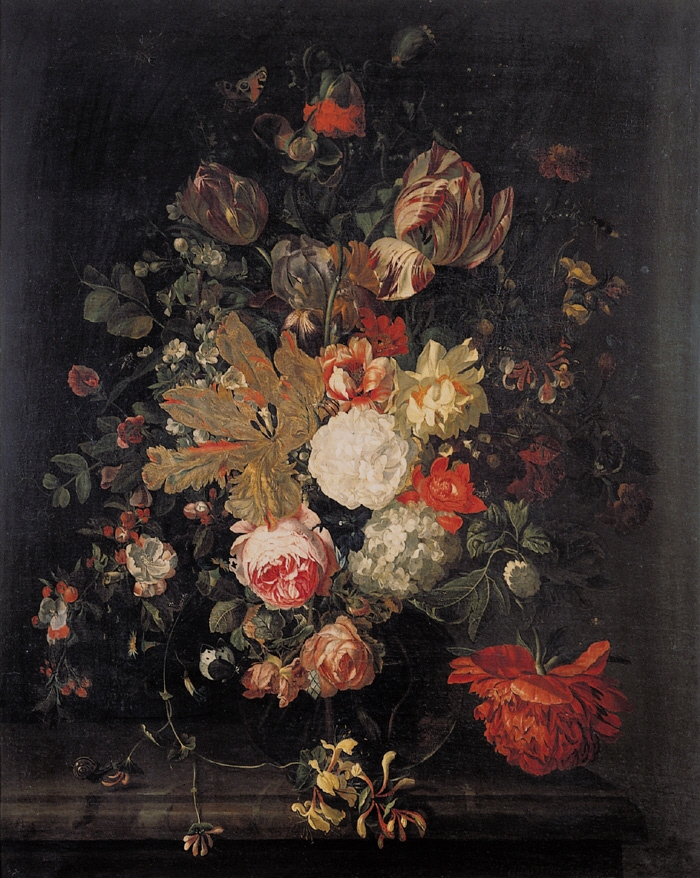
Flower still life, 1712

Catharina Backer was born in Amsterdam in 1689. Her parents were the lawyer Willem Cornelisz. Backer (1656–1731), of a prominent Amsterdam family, and Magdalena de la Court (1662–1712), the daughter of Pieter de la Court (1618–85) and his second wife, Catharina van der Voort (1622–1674).

Catharina Backer married her first cousin, the merchant and art collector Allard de la Court (1688–1755) of Leiden, on 25 August 1711. He was the son of Pieter de la Court van der Voort (1664–1739), Magdalena de la Court's brother. Allard de la Court and Catharina Backer lived in a house on the Rapenburg in Leiden. Their children included Pieter Allardsz de la Court (1722–73).

Catharina Backer died in Leiden in 1766.

== Art collection ==
Together Allard de la Court and Catharina Backer owned one of the richest art galleries in the Northern Netherlands. Arnold Boonen (1669–1729) painted their portraits in 1713 as part of a series of four that included her two sisters. After the deaths of their fathers in the 1730s, Allard de la Court and Catharina Backer inherited some of the art that their fathers had collected, although a pair of 1635 portraits by Pieter Dubordieu (1609–78) of their mutual great-grandparents, Pieter de la Court the Elder (1590–1657) and Jeanne des Planques (or Jeanne de Planque, 1591–1663), appears to have passed first to Allard's sister, Adriana Catharina de la Court (1690–1752), before entering Allard's collection following her death. Pieter de la Court van der Voort had been an important patron of Willem van Mieris (1662–1747) and commissioned a pair of paintings, still lifes of fruit and flowers, from Rachel Ruysch (1664–1750). These works became important in Catharina Backer's development as an artist. Her father, Willem Backer, had collected specimens of natural history as well as paintings by artists such as Jan van Goyen (1596–1656), Jan Lievens (1607–1674), Frederik de Moucheron (1633–1686), and Jan van der Heyden (1637–1712). Allard de la Court's spending on art increased after his mother died in 1740, and the art collection grew to completely fill the house on the Rapenburg, compelling the family to seek a new residence.

After her husband died in 1755, Backer inherited his art collection. She continued to show and add to the cabinet. In 1766, the year that she died, her estate sold much of her art collection with an auction catalog listing 215 items, including the pair of paintings by Rachel Ruysch. Her own artworks stayed in the family for another century.

== Drawing and painting ==
The Netherlands Institute for Art History describes Catharina Backer as an amateur artist. Such artists did not paint for a living, nor did they receive the kind of artistic training typical for professional artists. In the seventeenth century, amateur artists in the Netherlands usually belonged to families of high status who valued education and cultivation.

As part of her secondary education, Catharina Backer had drawing and painting lessons, arranged by her father. Her brother, Cornelis Backer (1693–1775), catalogued the works of art that she had created by the time of her marriage in 1711. These included ten albums of art as well as paintings. The albums contained her own sketches and drawings, including some that probably date from the time when she was receiving training in art.

A later album of Catharina Backer's drawings, apparently assembled in 1722 but including works that date as early as 1706, has been preserved in the collection of the Amsterdam Museum. The drawings provide some evidence of her artistic education. They depict studies of heads, hands, and the nude figure; studies of fruit; and sketches after other artists. She completed several drawings of sculptures by Francis van Bossuit (1635–1692) as well as a drawing of the Venus de' Medici after François Perrier (1590–1650). The album also features the type of drawings for which she is best known: images of flowers, plants, and insects. Although most of the work in the album is by Catharina Backer, it includes at least one drawing by Cornelis Backer.

Catharina Backer is known for painting many subjects, including flowers, fruit, landscapes, and genre pictures. She became a follower of Willem van Mieris, Rachel Ruysch, and Jan van Huysum (1682–1749), copying examples of their paintings that hung in her house. Late in her career, she created images of flowers in the media of oil on canvas.

== Gallery ==
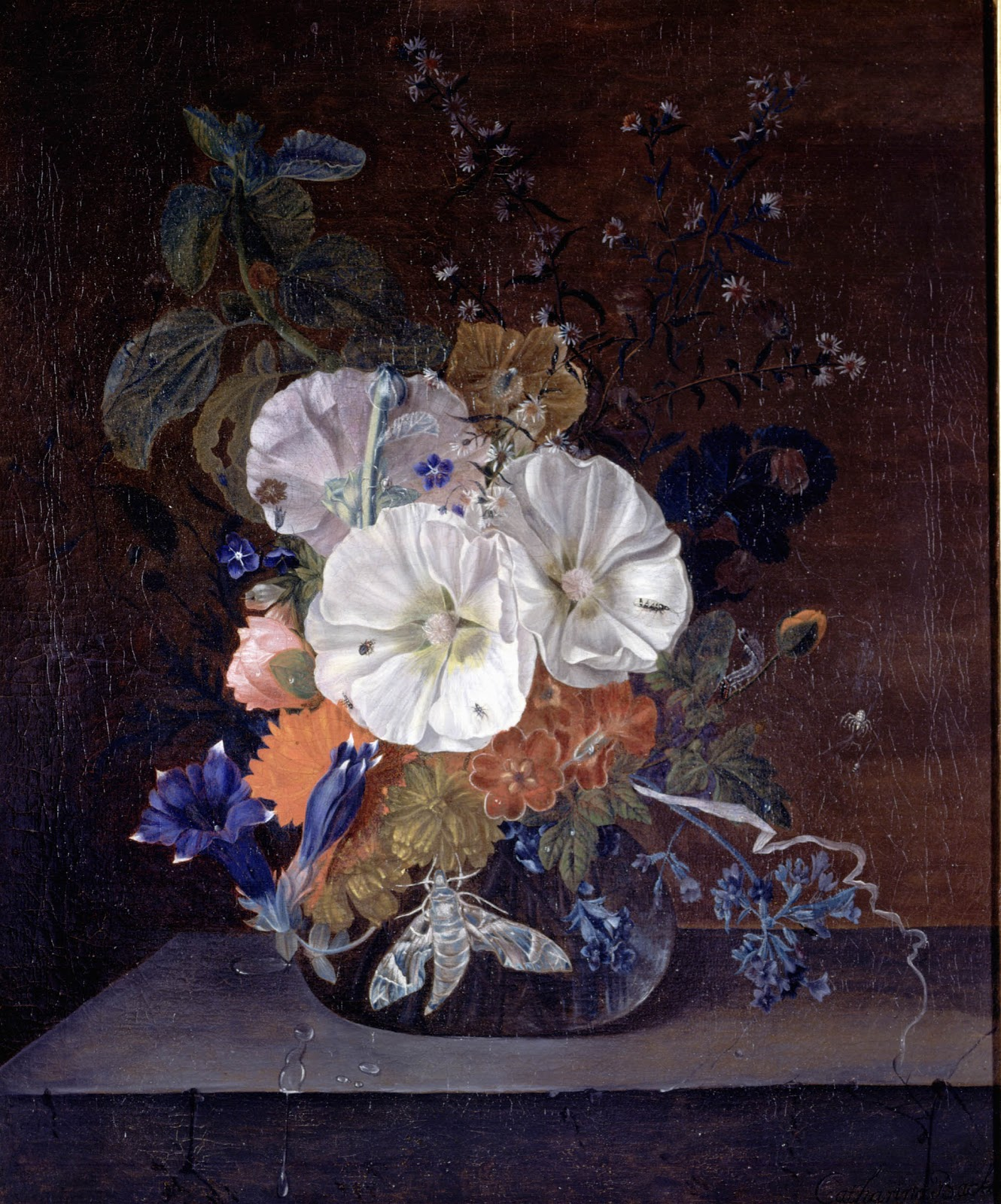
Catharina Backer, Flowers in a Vase on a Stone Ledge, before 1711

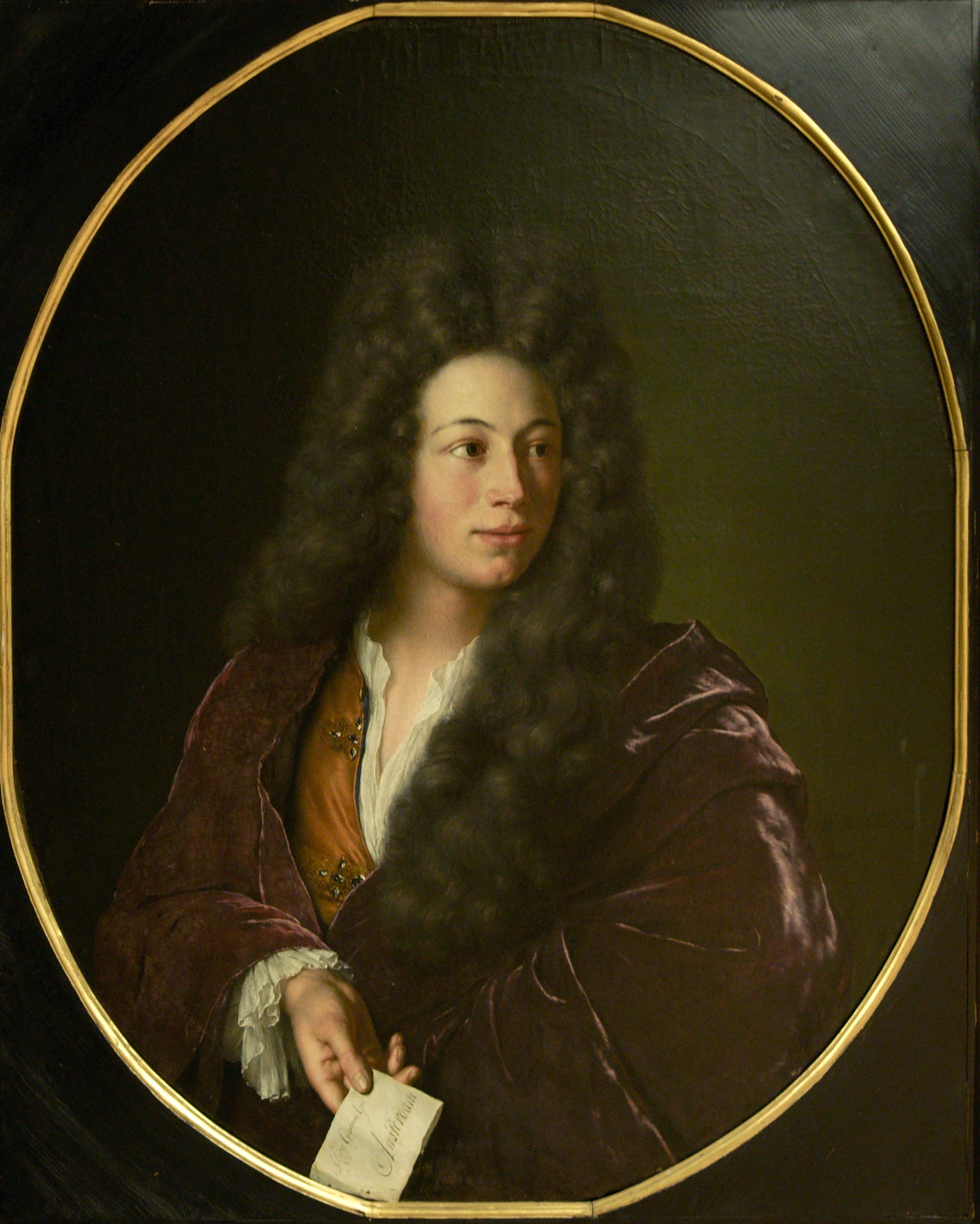
Allard de la Court in 1705, by Willem van Mieris

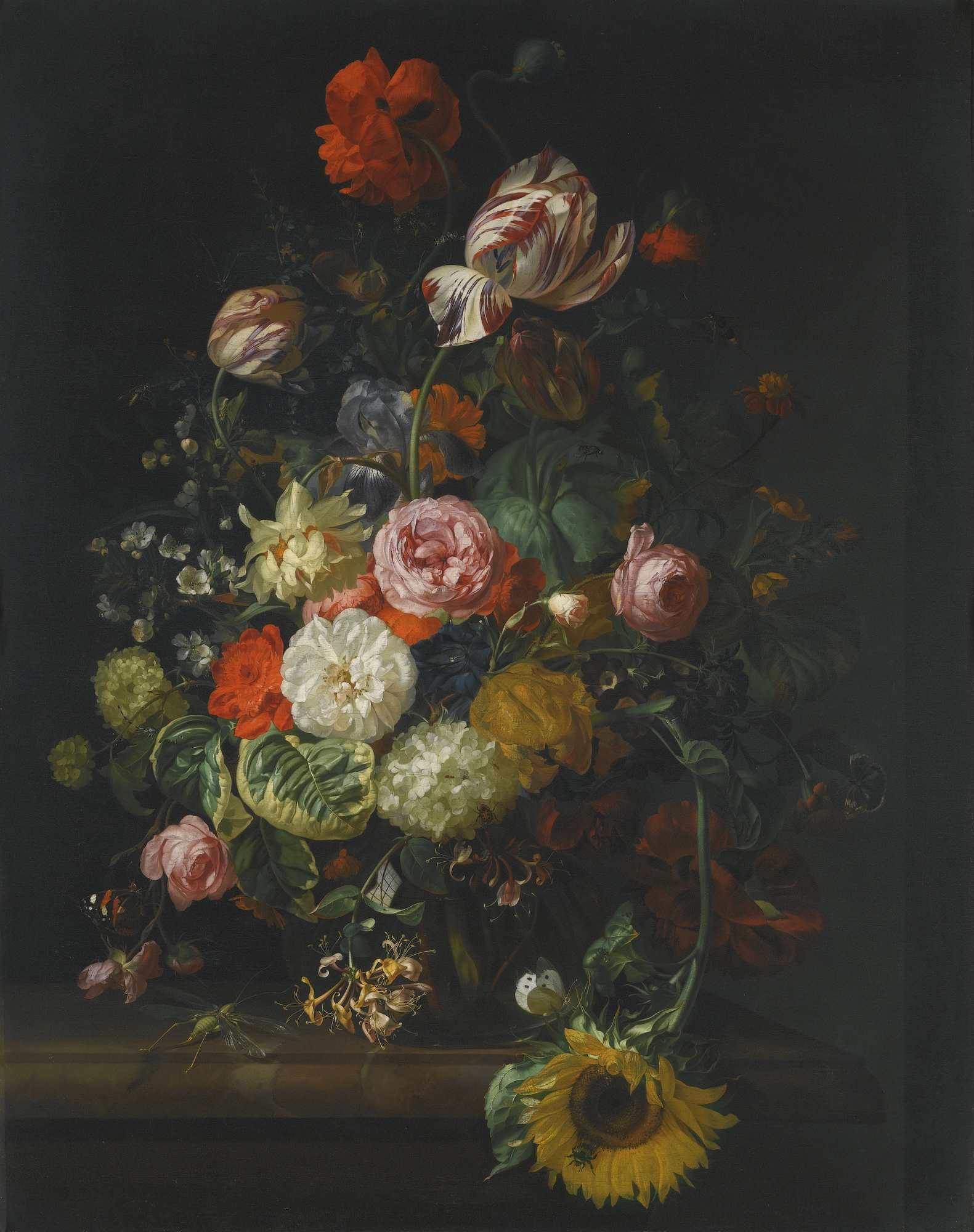
Flower Still-Life by Rachel Ruysch, from Catharina Backer's collection

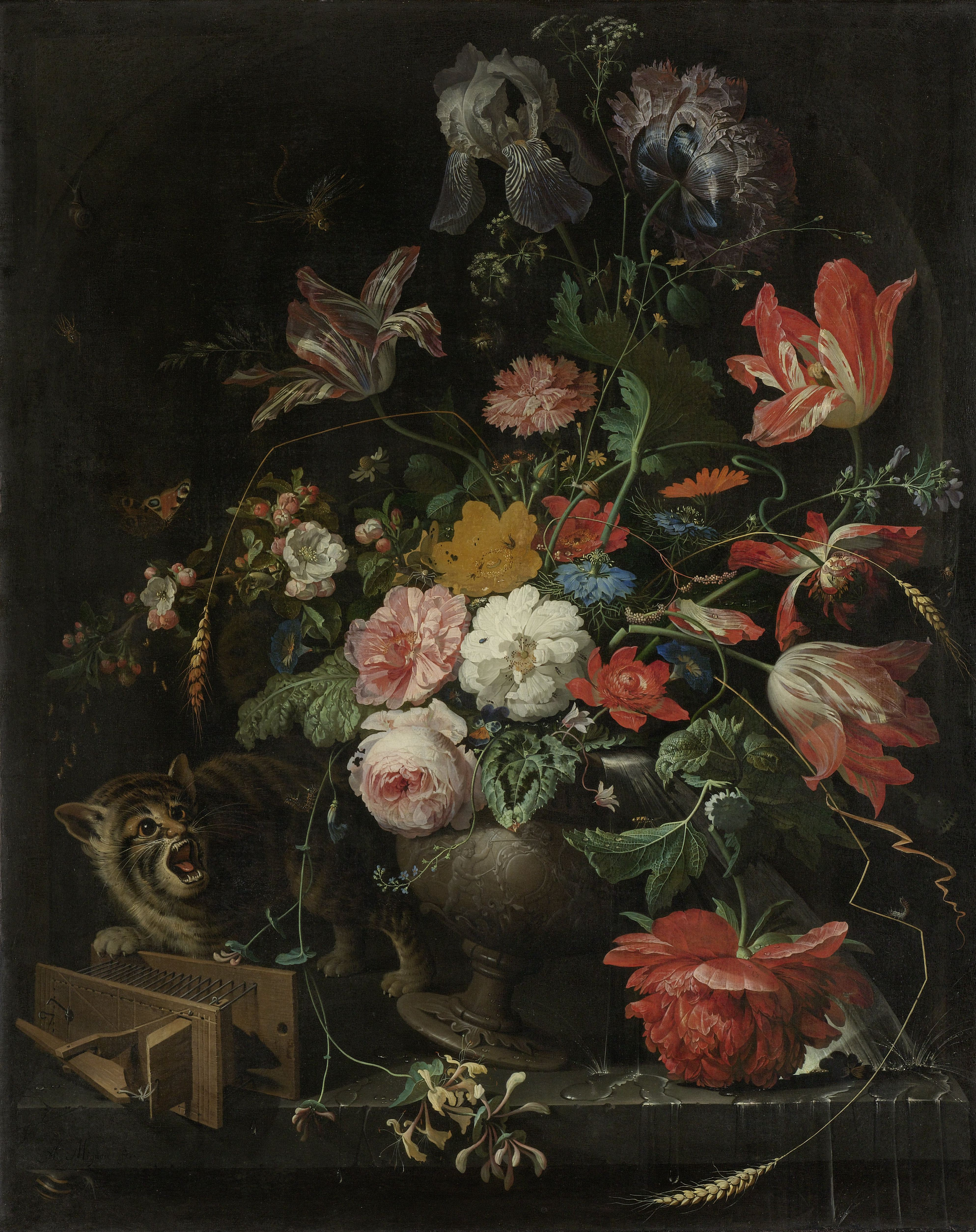
A painting by Abraham Mignon from Catharina Backer's collection
