= Roses, Convolvulus, Poppies, and Other Flowers in an Urn on a Stone Ledge =

Painting by Rachel Ruysch

Roses, Convolvulus, Poppies and Other Flowers in an Urn on a Stone Ledge
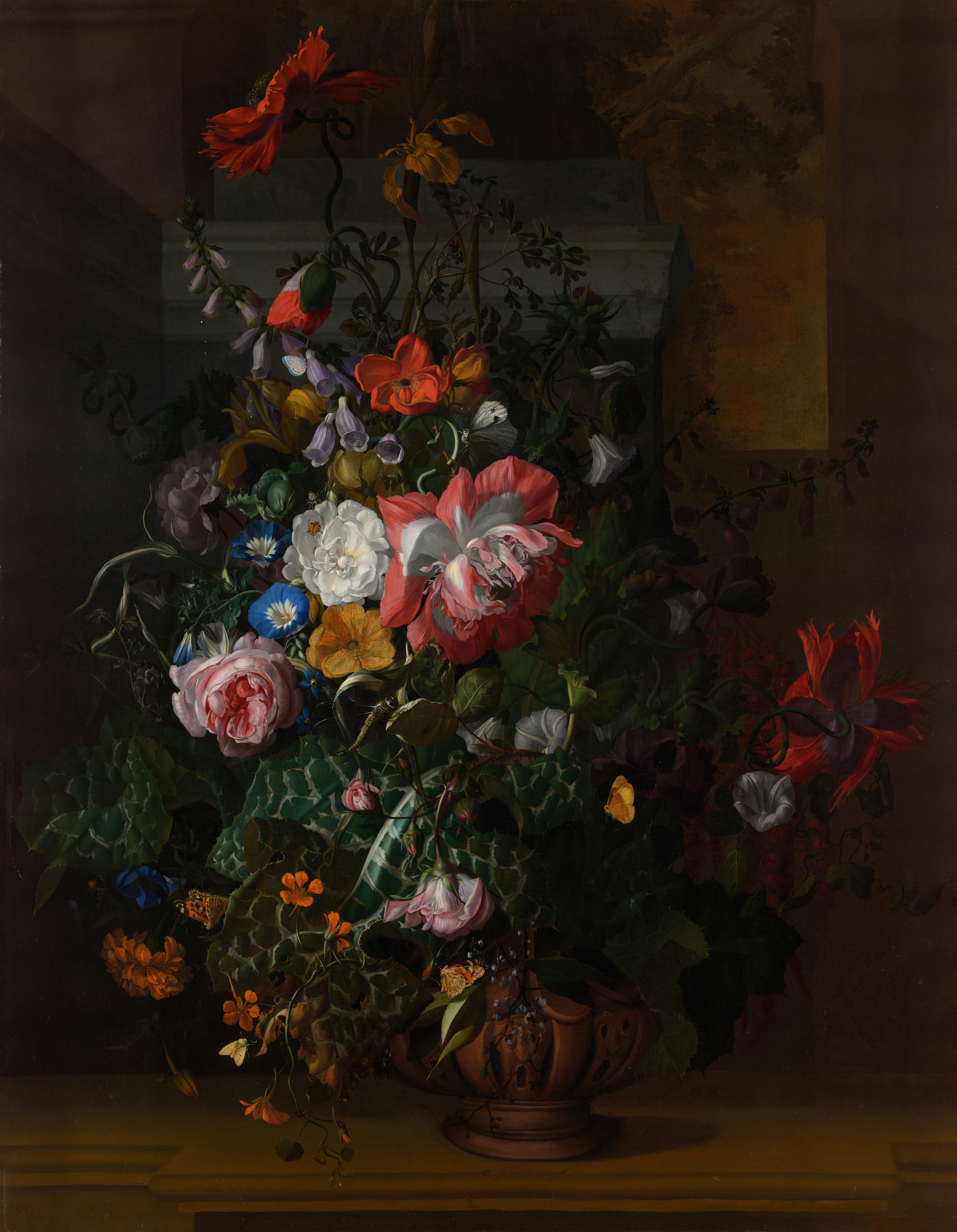
- Artist: Rachel Ruysch
- Year: 1688
- Medium: oil on canvas
- Dimensions: 106.68 cm × 83.82 cm (42.00 in × 33.00 in)
- Location: National Museum of Women in the Arts, Washington, D.C.

Roses, Convolvulus, Poppies and Other Flowers in an Urn on a Stone Ledge (1688) is an oil on canvas painting by the Dutch painter Rachel Ruysch. It is an example of Dutch Golden Age painting and is now in the collection of the National Museum of Women in the Arts, in Washington, D.C.

Ruysch has been recorded as making pendant paintings, with one painting of flowers (called a "bloemstuk") and another of fruit ("fruitstuk"), often on a forest floor. A pendant to this painting is unknown. Various attempts have been made to "read" her paintings in terms of the plants and insects shown in them, but generally they were simply treasured for their beauty and "cleverness". In this painting there are several botanically correct plants, with various insects on them.

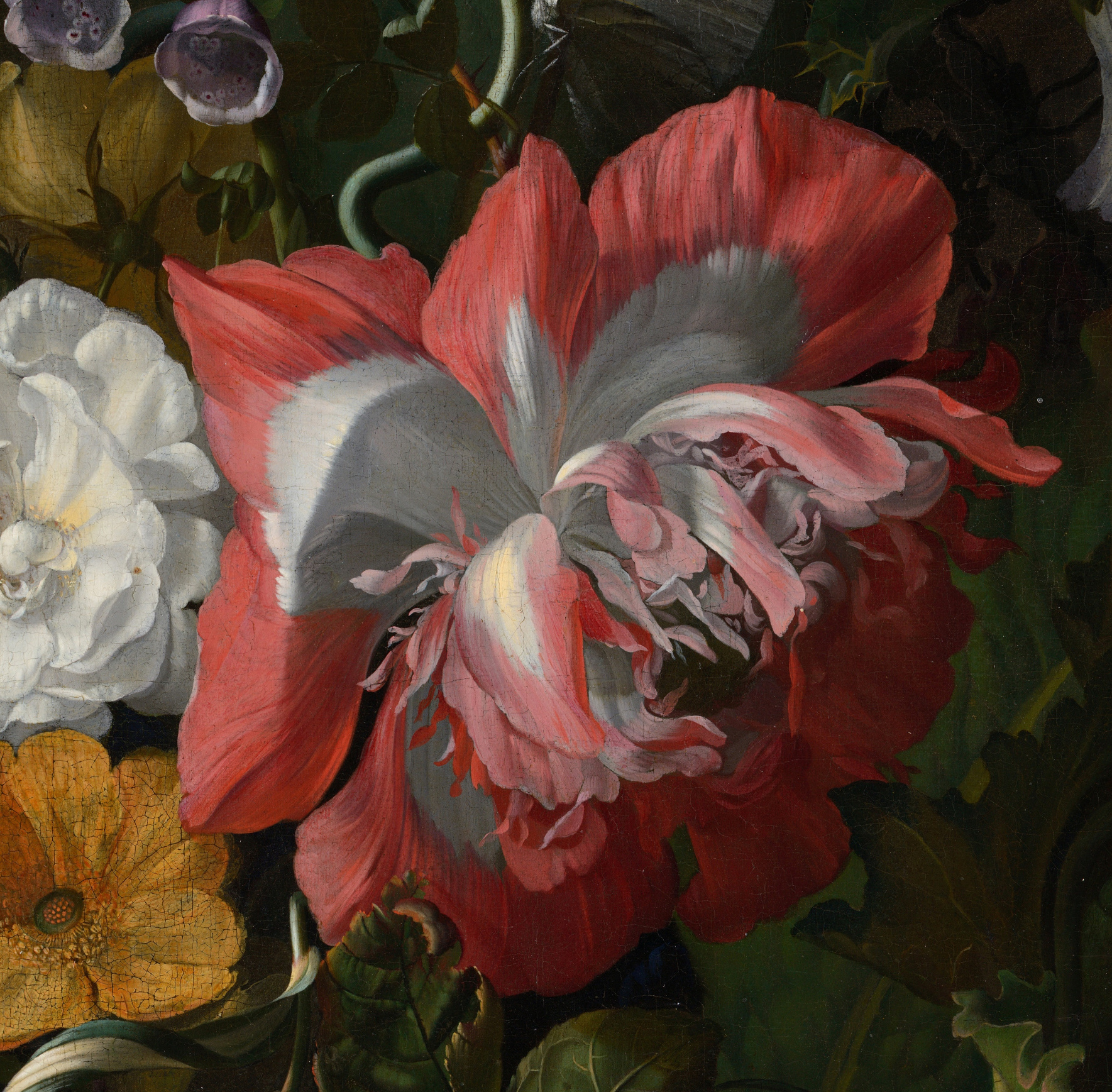
The central flower is a peony.

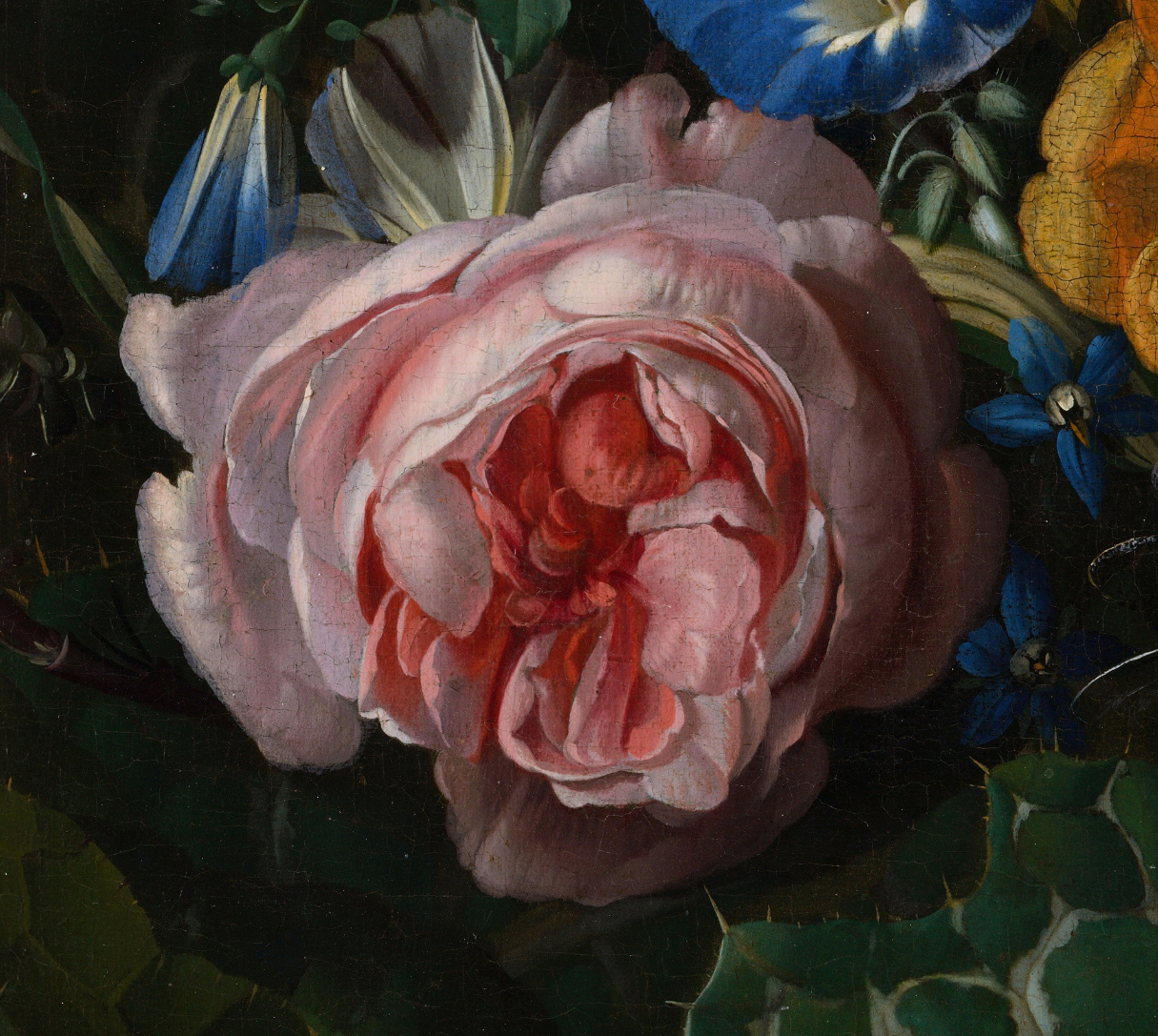
The pink rose hangs above a milk thistle.

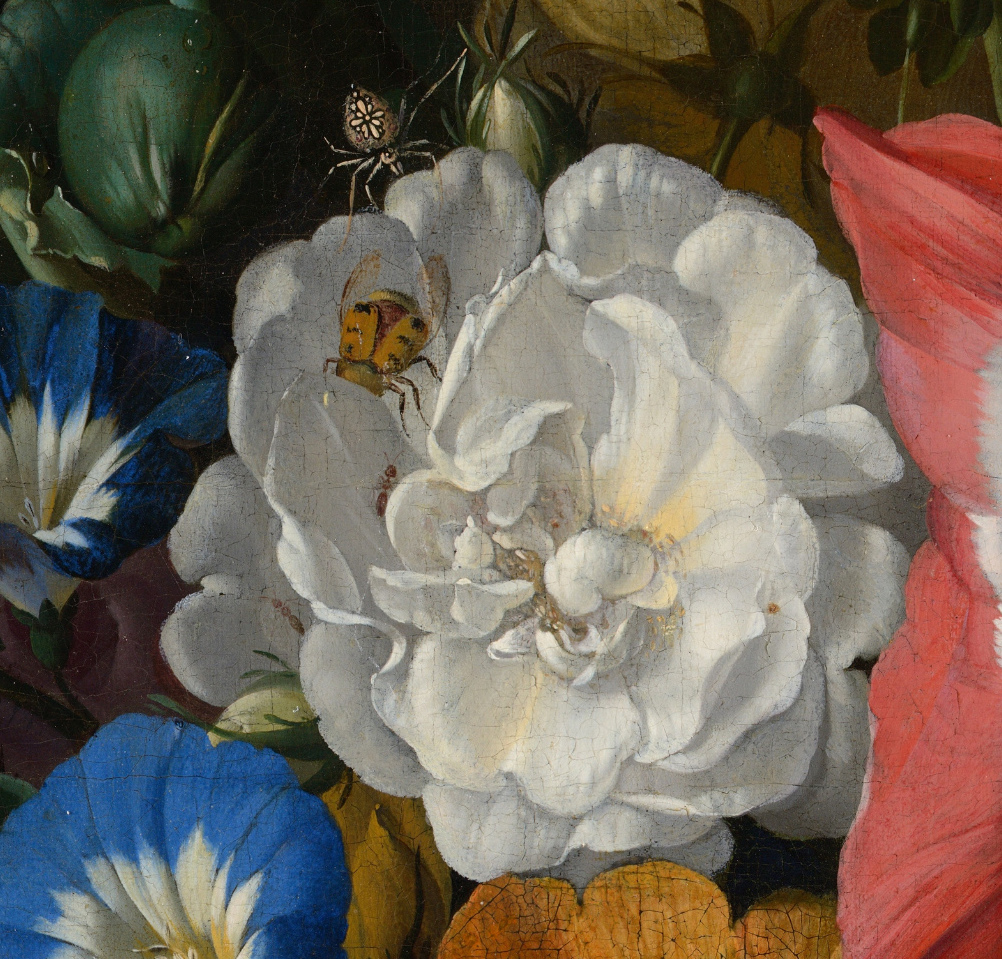
The white rose is host to a spider, beetle, and ants.

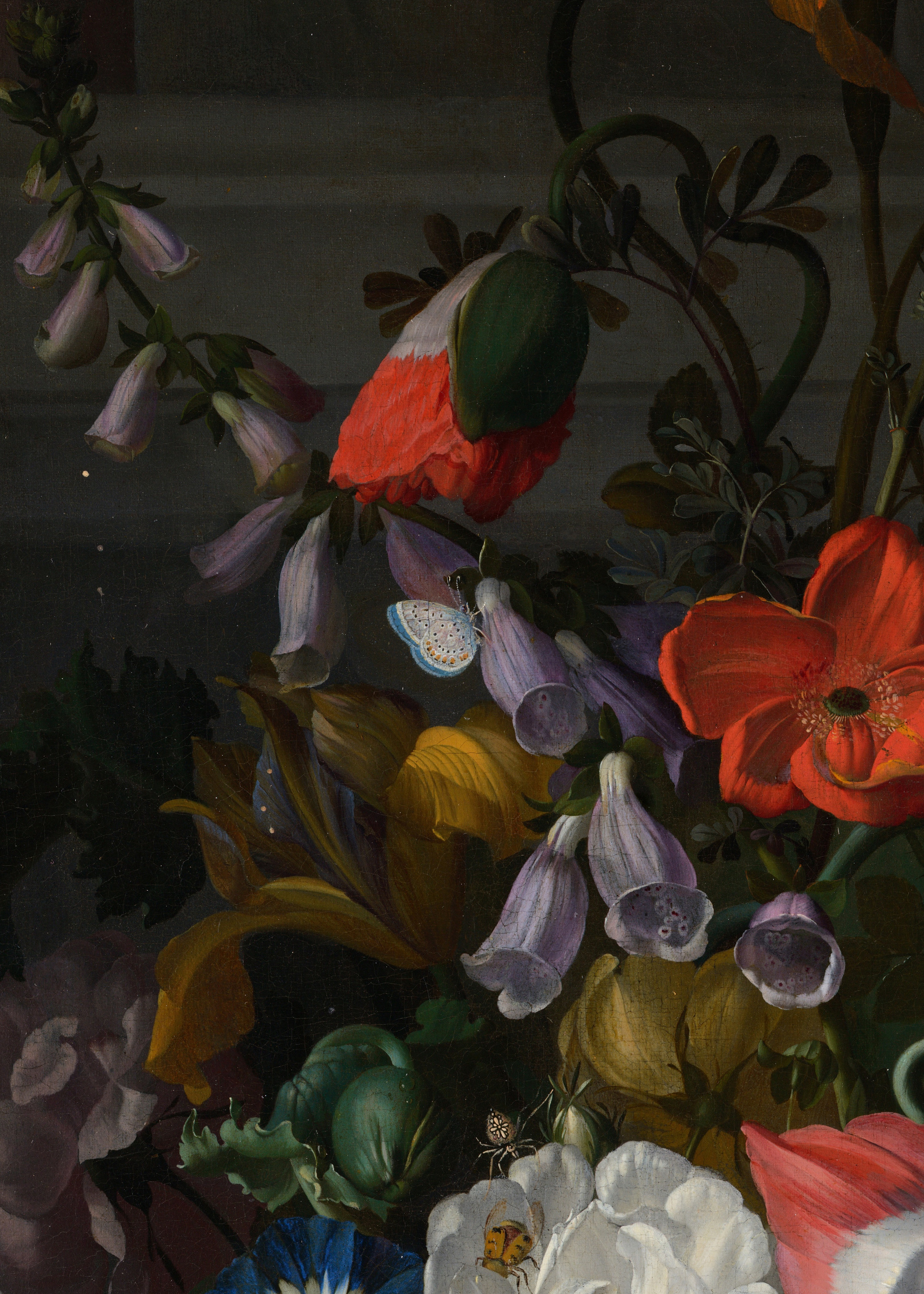
Foxglove with a butterfly.

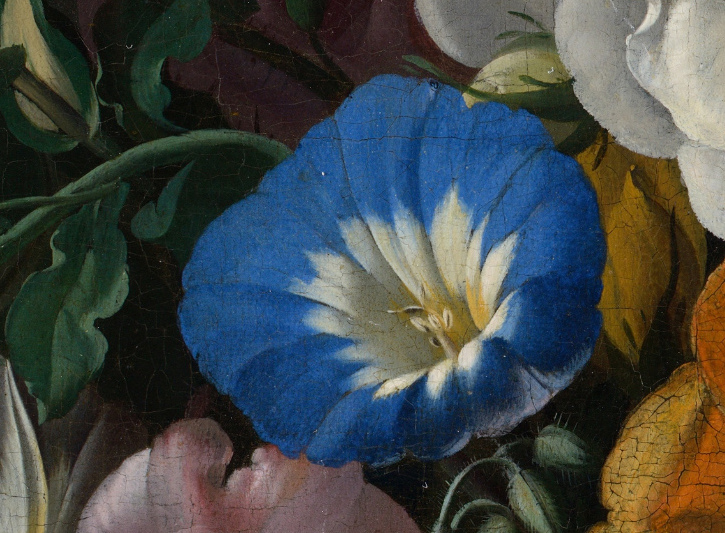
Nasturtium.

This painting was gifted in 1986 by Wilhelmina Holladay. Its provenance doesn't go further back than an advertisement by Alan Jacobs Gallery Ltd., London, in 1984. This is typical for flower still life paintings: once they leave a collection, descriptions of them are too varied to pinpoint them exactly, and Ruysch's production was unusually high for a woman painter, mostly because she remained productive throughout her (very long) life.

Other "Flowers in a vase on a ledge" paintings by Ruysch are:

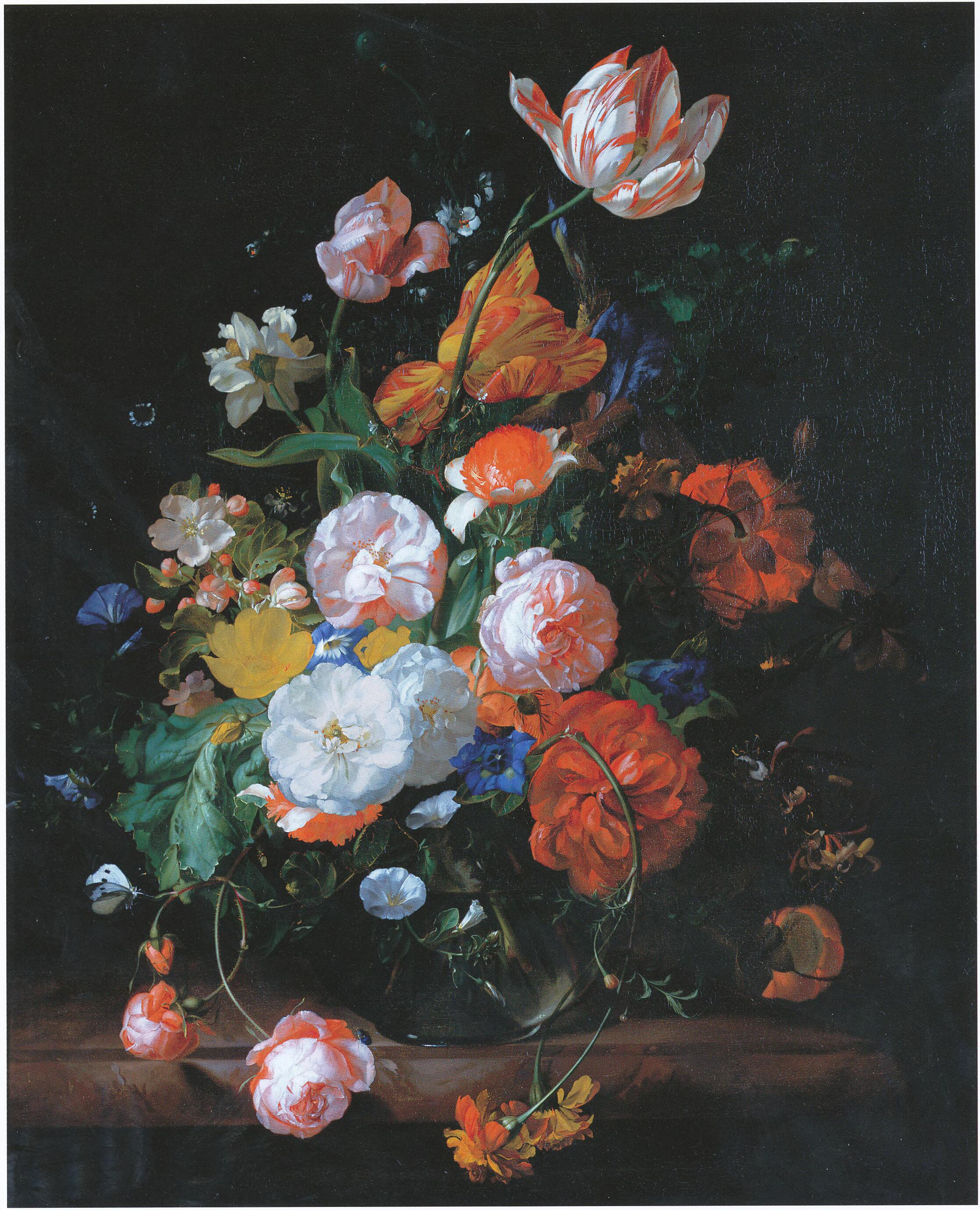
Alte Pinakothek, Munich.

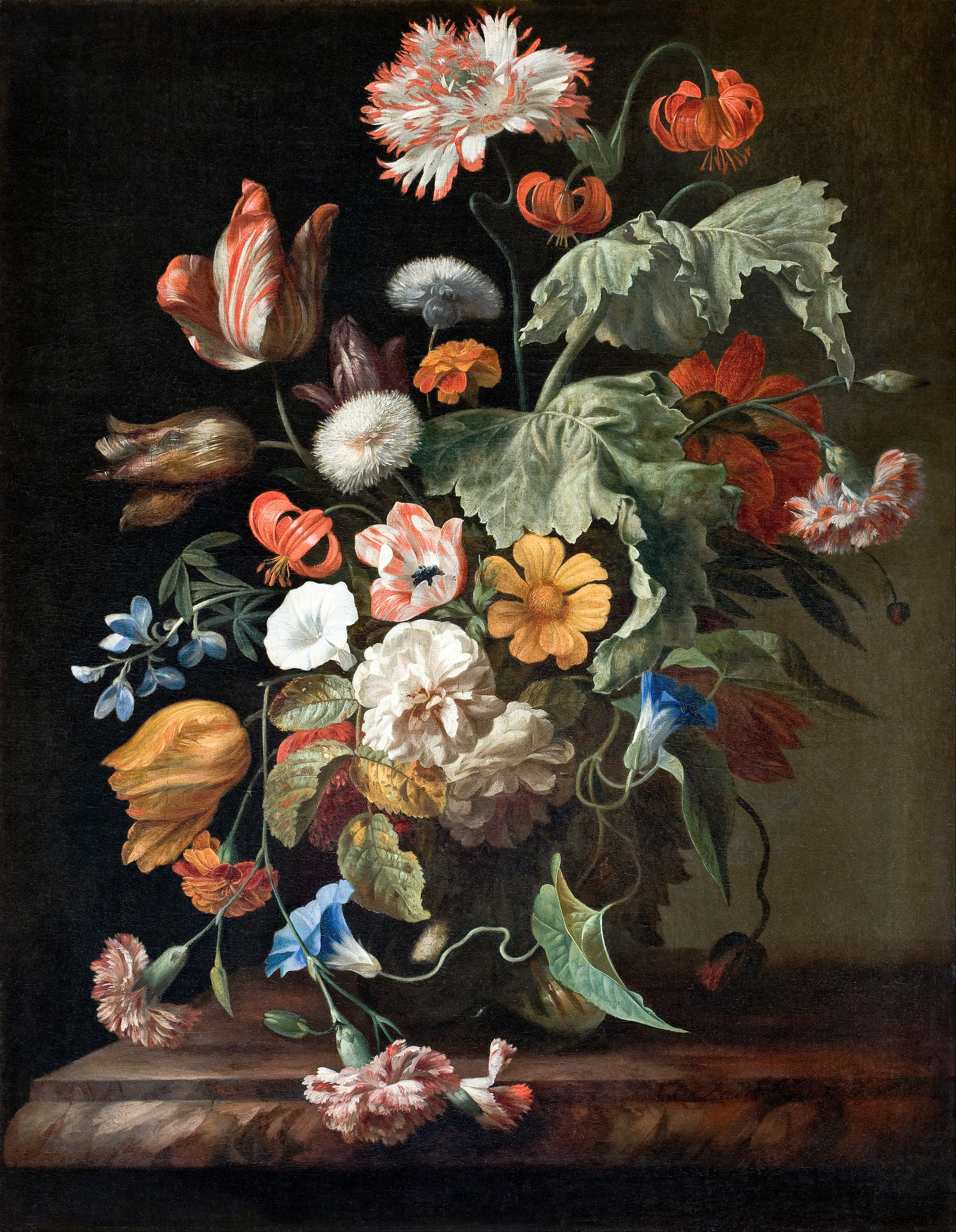
Hallwyl Museum.

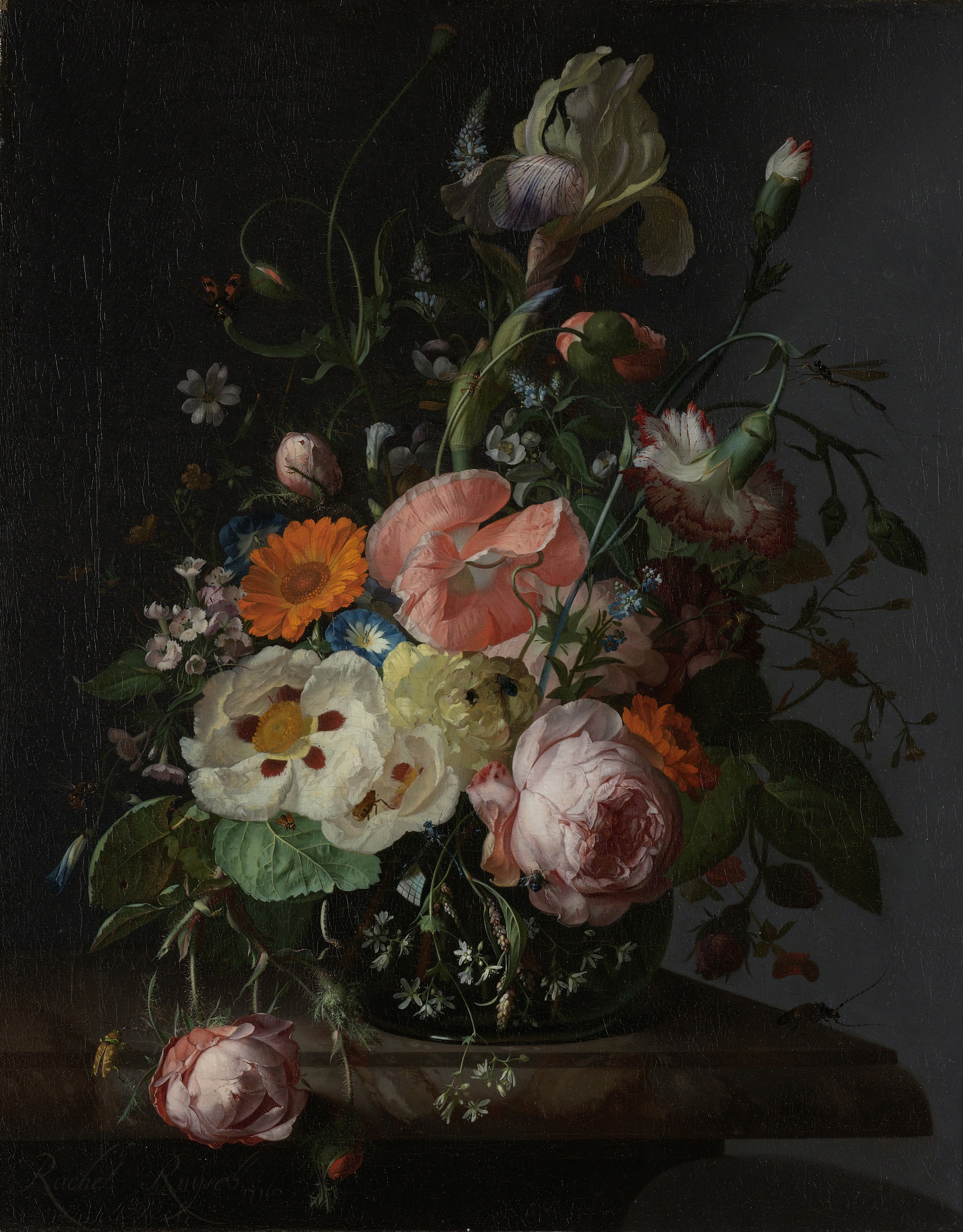
Rijksmuseum.
