= Juriaen Pool =

18th century painter

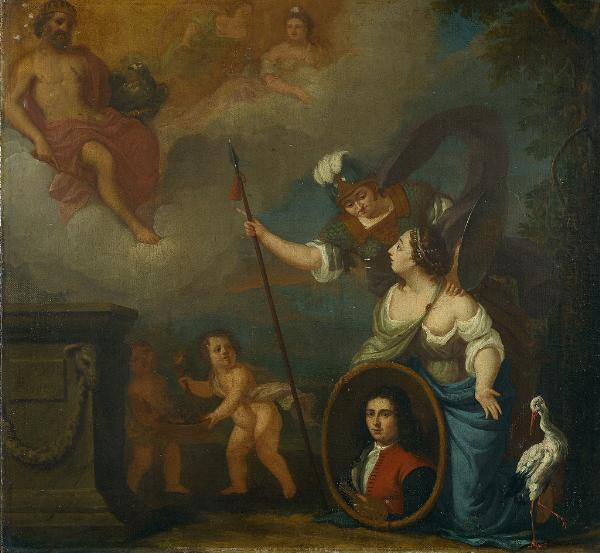
Self-portrait in allegorical scene for the orphanage. He is shown wearing the traditional orphan clothing with a red jacket and a blue sleeve.

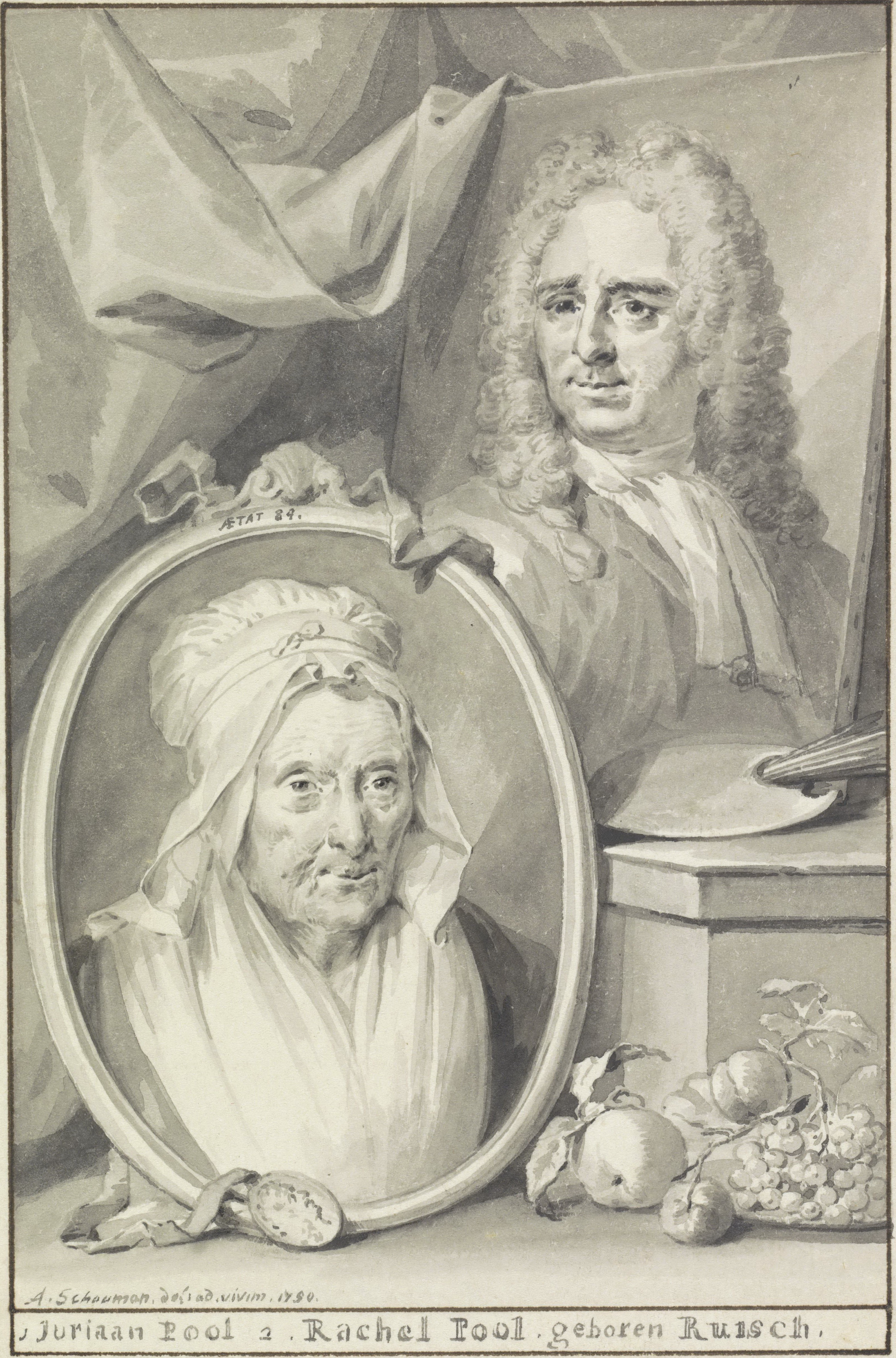
Juriaan and his wife Rachel Pool, engraving from Jan van Gool's Nieuwe Schouburg, 1750

Juriaen Pool (bapt. 17 January 1666 – 6 October 1745) was an 18th-century painter from the Dutch Republic best known as the husband of Rachel Ruysch, with whom he had ten children.

== Biography ==
Pool was born and died in Amsterdam. According to the RKD he was the son of Jurriaan Pool the elder. He became engaged on 25 July 1693 and on 12 August he married the flower painter Rachel Ruysch in Buiksloot. He became the teacher of the painter Gerhard Jan Palthe.
