= Rachel Ruysch =

Dutch artist (1664–1750)

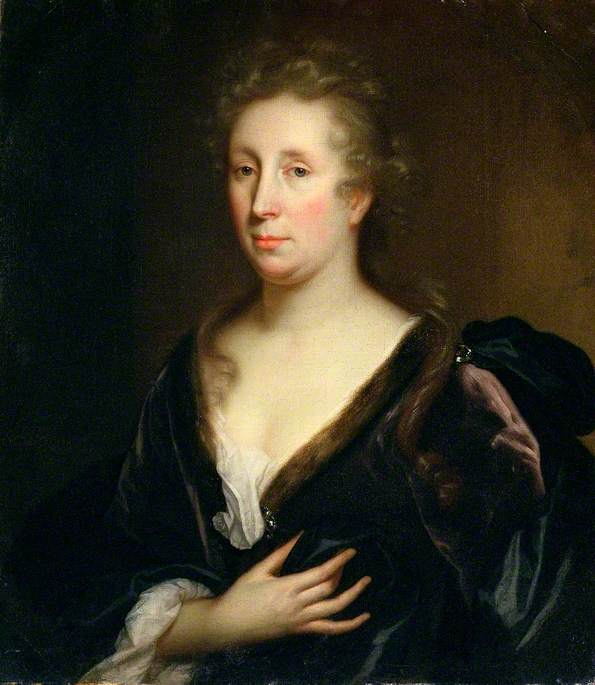
- Portrait of Rachel Ruysch by Godfried Schalcken
- Born: 3 June 1664; The Hague, Netherlands
- Died: 12 October 1750 (aged 86); Amsterdam, Netherlands
- Known for: Painting
- Spouse: Juriaen Pool (m. 1693; died 1745)

Rachel Ruysch (3 June 1664 – 12 October 1750) was a Dutch still-life painter from the Dutch Republic. She specialized in flowers, inventing her own style and achieving international fame in her lifetime. Due to a long and successful career that spanned over six decades, she became the best documented female painter of the Dutch Golden Age.

== Personal life and career ==
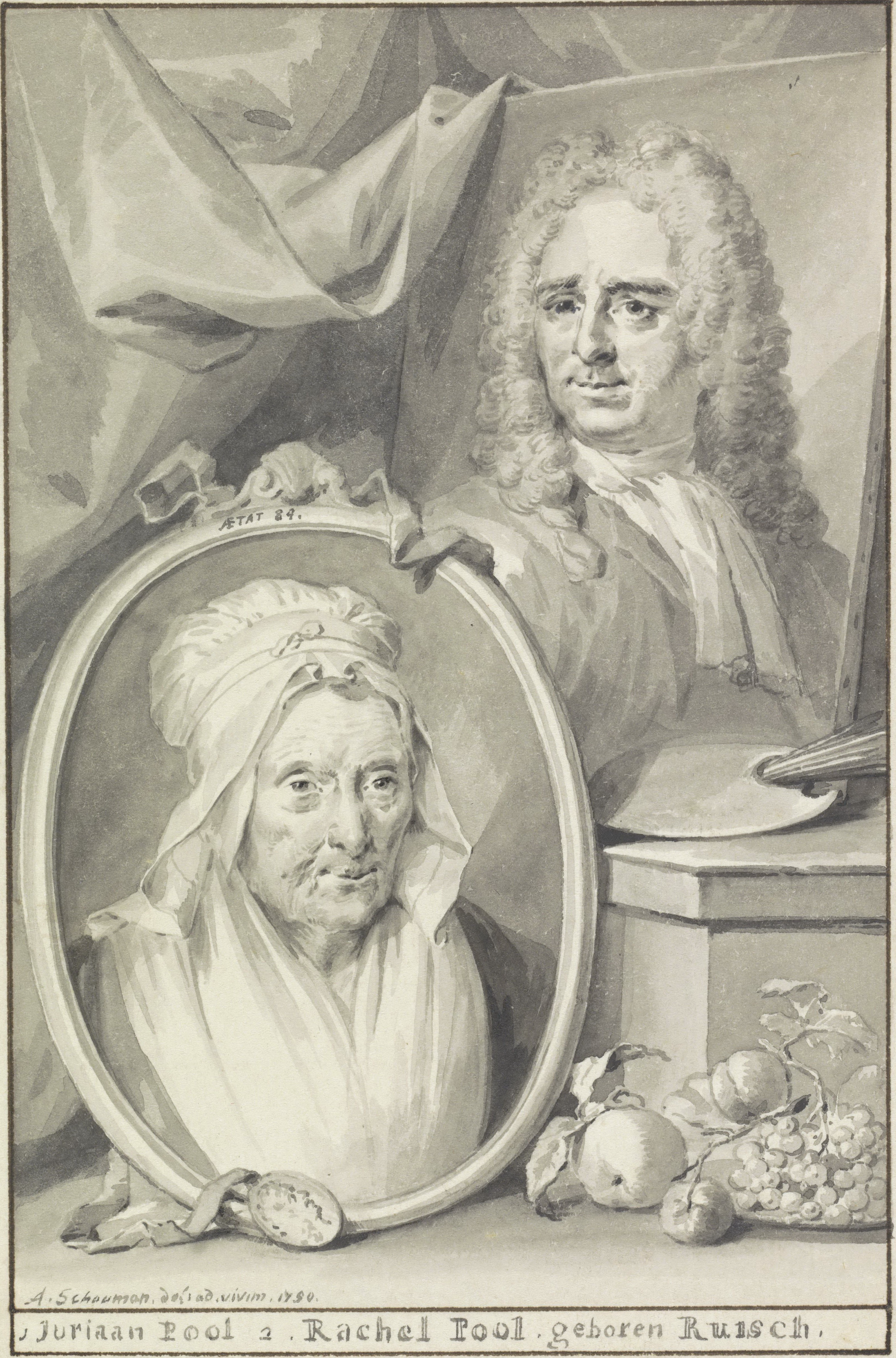
The captions translate as "Juriaan Pool and Rachel Pool, born Ruisch" with "aged 84" inscribed above Ruysch's portrait. (Pool was already deceased at the time this picture was made.)

Rachel Ruysch was born on 3 June 1664 in The Hague to the scientist Frederik Ruysch and Maria Post, the daughter of the architect Pieter Post. Her father was also a professor of anatomy and botany and an amateur painter. He had a vast collection of animal skeletons, and mineral and botany samples which Rachel used to practice her drawing skills. At a young age she began to paint the flowers and insects of her father's collection in the popular manner of Otto Marseus van Schrieck. Working from these samples Rachel matched her father's ability to depict nature with great accuracy. Rachel and her sister Anna Ruysch learned to draw and paint within their father's extensive scientific collections, which provided abundant botanical and zoological specimens for study. Both sisters pursued painting careers, although Anna appears to have stopped painting after her marriage, while Rachel continued professionally for more than six decades.

In 1679, at age fifteen, Ruysch was apprenticed to Willem van Aelst, a prominent flower painter in Amsterdam. His studio in Amsterdam looked out over the studio of the flower painter Maria van Oosterwijck. Ruysch studied with van Aelst until his death in 1683. Besides painting technique he taught her how to arrange a bouquet in a vase so it would look spontaneous and less formalized. This technique produced a more realistic and three-dimensional effect in her paintings. By the time Ruysch was eighteen she was producing and selling independently signed works. She would also have known and consorted with the flower painters Jan and Maria Moninckx, Alida Withoos, and Johanna Helena Herolt-Graff, who all were about her age and who worked for the horticulturist Agnes Block and who, like her father, also worked with the plant collectors Jan and Caspar Commelin.

In 1693 she married the Amsterdam portrait painter Juriaen Pool, with whom she had ten children. Throughout her marriage and adult life she continued to paint and produce commissions for an international circle of patrons. Other women at this time were expected to participate in art forms more traditionally practiced by women, such as sewing and spinning. Ruysch continued to work as a painter throughout her marriage, supported by the strong demand for her flower pieces and the high prices they commanded. Her paintings often earned more than the portrait work her husband undertook, and her established reputation enabled her to maintain a professional career alongside raising a family.

Ruysch enjoyed great fame within her lifetime, and post-mortem alike. In her lifetime her paintings were sold for prices as high as 750–1200 guilders. In comparison, Rembrandt rarely received more than 500 guilders for a painting in his lifetime. She died in Amsterdam on 12 October 1750, and remains a widely respected artist.

== Works ==
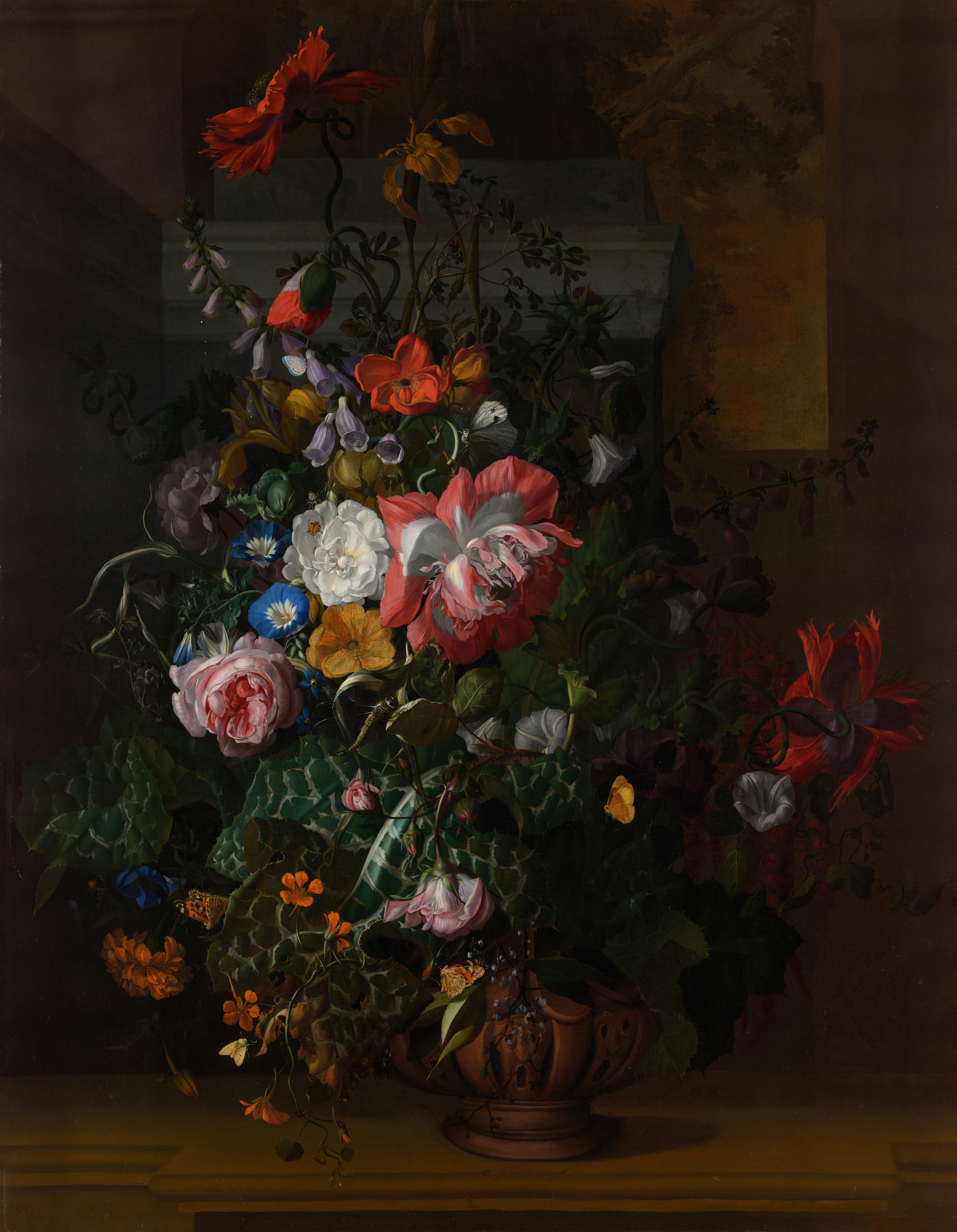
Roses, Convolvulus, Poppies, and Other Flowers in an Urn on a Stone Ledge (1688)

It is unknown whether Ruysch was a member of the Amsterdam Guild of Saint Luke, but early signed works by her in the 1680s show the influence of Otto Marseus van Schrieck. By 1699 she and her family had moved to The Hague, where she was offered membership in the Confrerie Pictura as their first female member. In 1701 she and her husband became members of The Hague Painter's Guild. In 1708, Ruysch was invited to work for the court in Düsseldorf and serve as court painter to Johann Wilhelm, Elector Palatine. She obtained a contract for works painted at home that she periodically brought to Düsseldorf. She continued working for him and his wife from 1708 until the prince's death in 1716.

Art historians consider Ruysch to be one of the most talented still life artists. By the time of her death at age 86 she had produced hundreds of paintings, of which more than 250 have been documented or are attributed to her. Her dated works establish that she painted from the age of 15 until she was 83, a few years before her death. Historians are able to establish this with certainty because she included her age when signing her paintings.

== Style ==
Ruysch had a very good understanding of drawing and the techniques of earlier traditions. This knowledge improved her painting abilities. In contrast to many late seventeenth-century Dutch still-life painters, who often favored more restrained and scientifically oriented botanical compositions, Ruysch developed a more dynamic and asymmetrical approach. Her bouquets incorporate twisting stems, suspended blossoms, and lively diagonals that break from the more diagrammatic conventions of botanical illustration. Every petal was created painstakingly with delicate brushwork. The background of Ruysch's paintings are usually dark which was the fashion for flower painting in the second half of the 17th century. Her asymmetrical compositions with drooping flowers and wild stems created paintings that seemed to possess a great energy about them.

In her early work Ruysch painted a large number of forest floor pictures that feature small animals, reptiles, butterflies, and fungi. Ruysch's teacher Willem van Aelst introduced her to looser and more spontaneous compositional structures, but she later refined and popularized this manner. Her mature bouquets, with their elaborate layering and rhythmic movement, helped define the evolving taste for more dynamic floral still lifes in the early eighteenth century. She later focused almost exclusively on complex floral bouquets, combining the minute scientific observation learned from her father's collections with imagined arrangements that could not exist in nature, producing an aesthetic that blended naturalism with invention.

The symbolism of each flower was elaborately developed in the 17th century, but most of this concerned the introduction of a single flower into a Vanitas piece.

== Reception ==
In 1999 a painting by Ruysch was discovered in a farmhouse in Normandy and was sold at auction for 2.9 million French francs, about US$508,000.

In the twenty-first century, Ruysch's work has received renewed scholarly and curatorial attention. The exhibition ''Rachel Ruysch: Nature into Art'' (2024–25), organized by the Alte Pinakothek, the Toledo Museum of Art, and the Museum of Fine Arts, Boston, offered the first large-scale international reevaluation of her oeuvre. The accompanying catalogue received the 2024 George Wittenborn Memorial Book Award.

In March 2021, Ruysch's work was added to the "Gallery of Honour" at the Rijksmuseum. Ruysch, Gesina ter Borch, and Judith Leyster are the first women to be included in the gallery.

In 2025, the Toledo Museum of Art, Alte Pinakothek, Munich and the Museum of Fine Arts, Boston organized the exhibition Rachel Ruysch: Nature into Art. It was held at the Alte Pinakothek November 26, 2024 – March 16, 2025; Toledo Museum April 12 – July 27, 2025, Museum of Fine Arts (titled Rachel Ruysch: Artist, Naturalist, and Pioneer), August 23–December 7, 2025. The exhibition was accompanied with a catalog Rachel Ruysch Nature into Art, by Robert Schindler, Bernd Ebert, Anna C. Knaap, et al. The catalog won the 2024 George Wittenborn Memorial Book Award.ISBN 978-0-87846-899-7

== Historical context ==
Many of the plants that appear in Ruysch's still lifes reached the Dutch Republic through global trade networks that connected Europe to territories in the Americas, Africa, and Asia. Botanical species from regions such as Suriname and the Cape Colony were collected, transported, and cultivated so that they could be studied or drawn once they arrived in Amsterdam. These plants were often grown in colonial botanical gardens, and recent scholarship has noted that the labor of enslaved workers played a central role in maintaining these sites and supporting the circulation of rare specimens.

The availability of imported plants shaped the botanical variety seen in Ruysch's paintings. Amsterdam's position as a center of global trade created conditions in which artists had access to species from many parts of the world, which were studied in scientific collections and used as models for naturalistic still lifes.

== Gallery ==
Rachel Ruysch's works

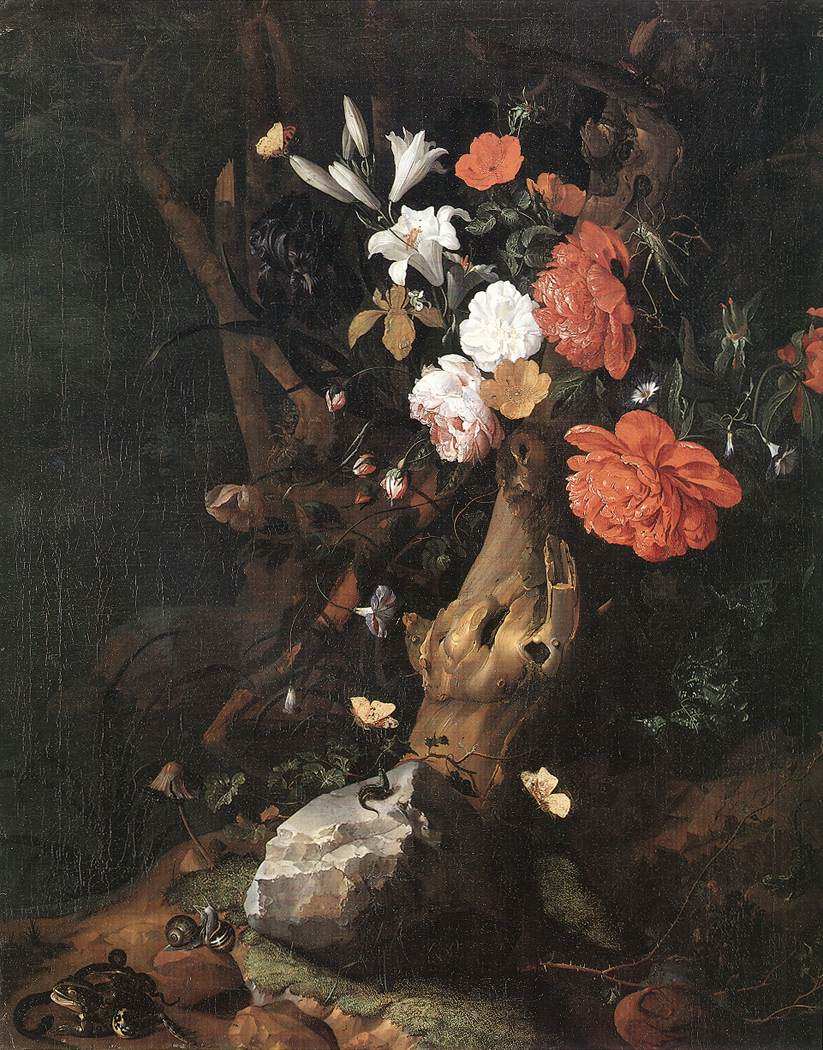
Flowers on a tree trunk; this is a typical example of the "forest floor" genre made popular by Marseus van Schrieck

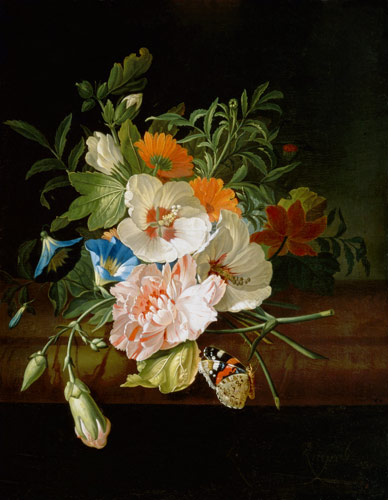
Flowers on a stone slab - her most common style around 1700

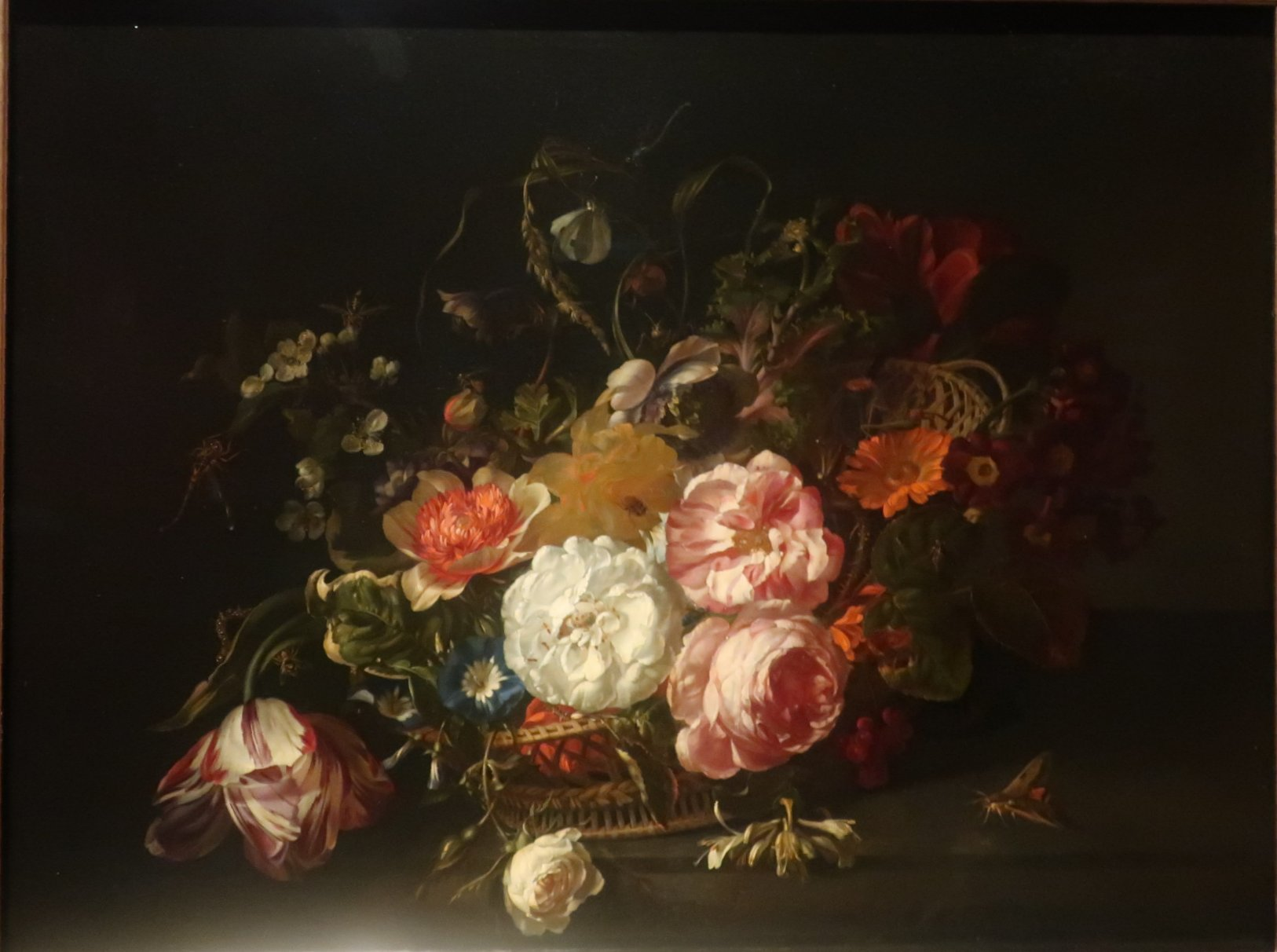
Basket of Flowers, 1711

Still-Life with Flowers

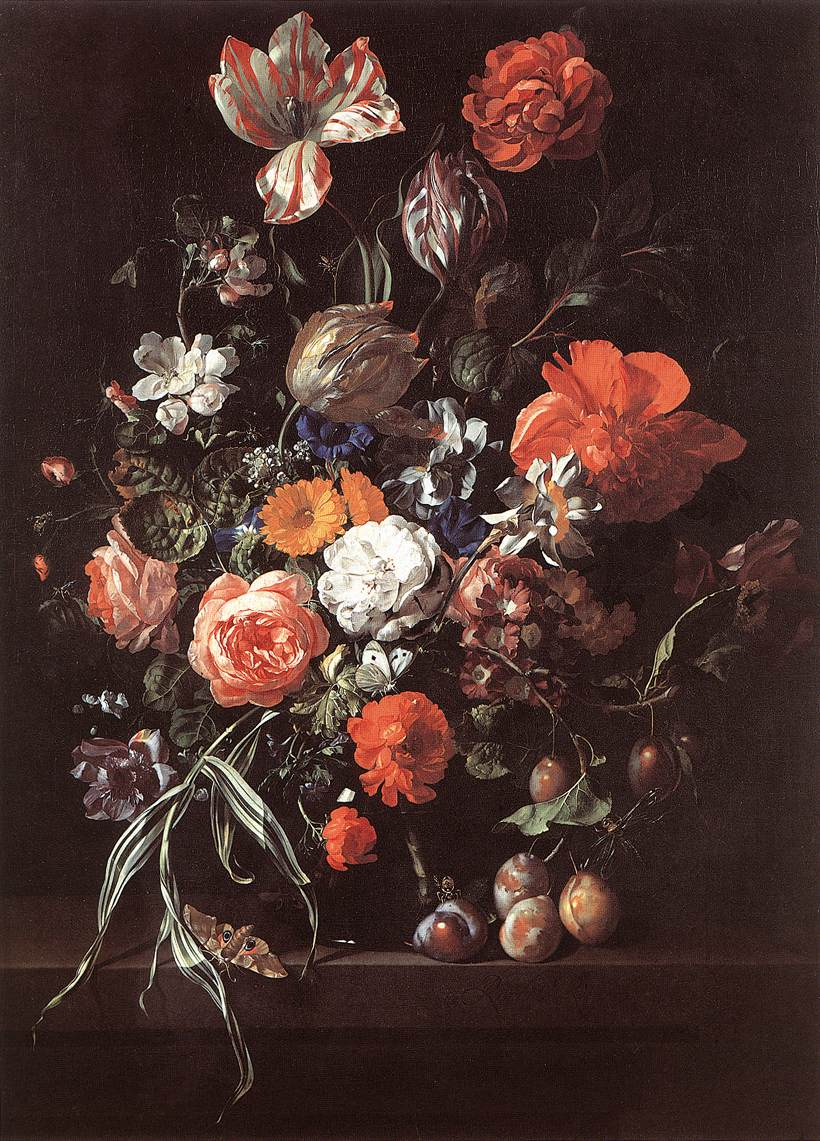
Rachel Ruysch, Still-Life with Bouquet of Flowers and Plums, 1704, Royal Museums of Fine Arts of Belgium

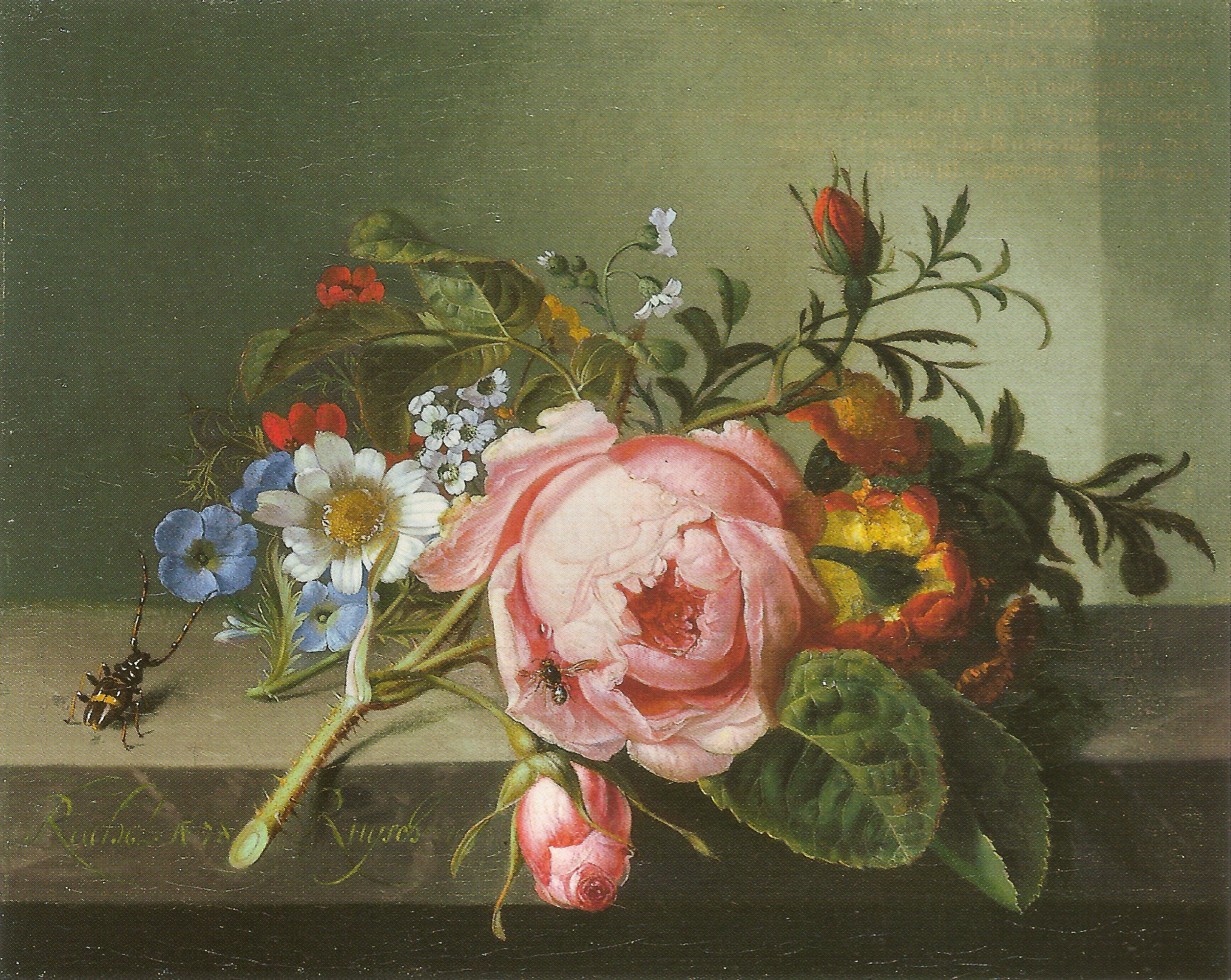
Rose branch with beetle and bee, 1741

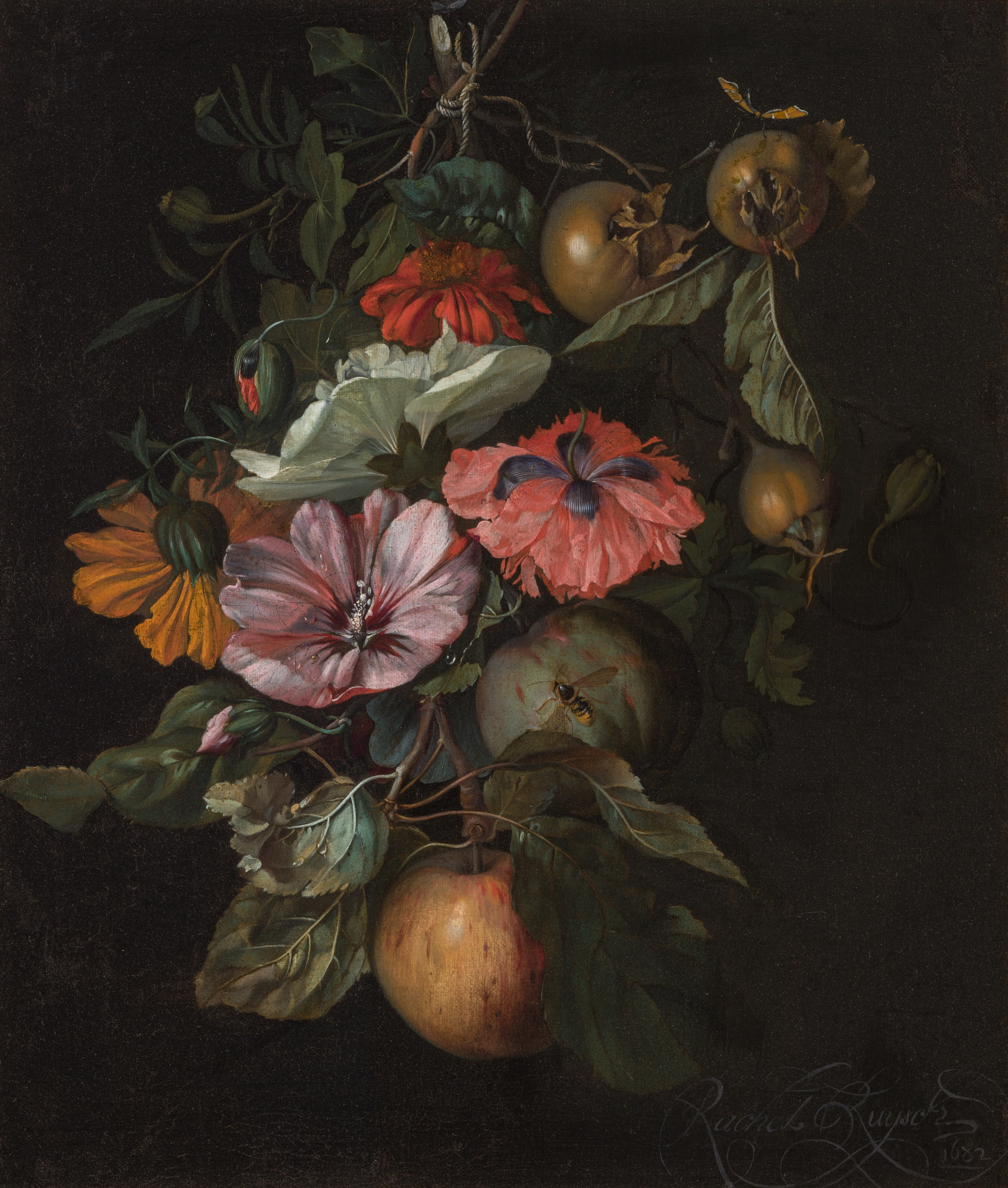
Festoon of Flowers and Fruit, 1682

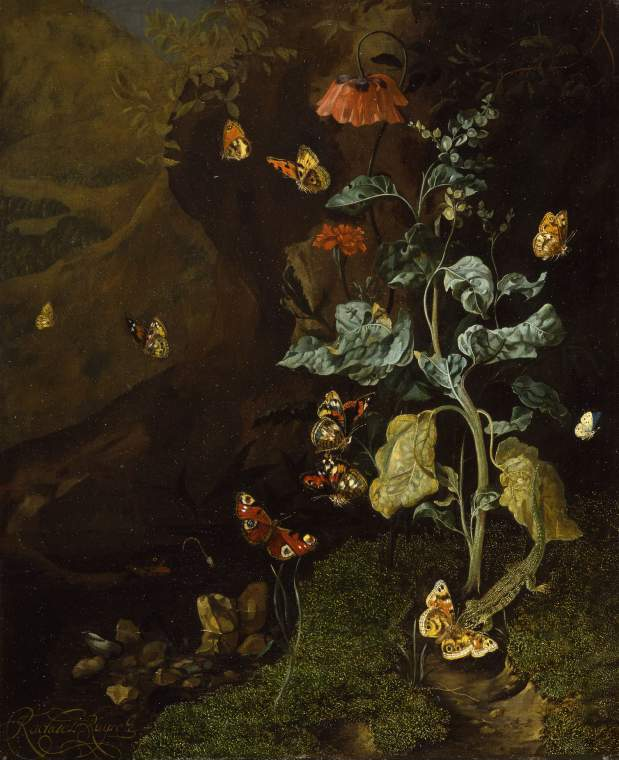
Still life with flowers, butterflies and a lizard in a dell, 1700

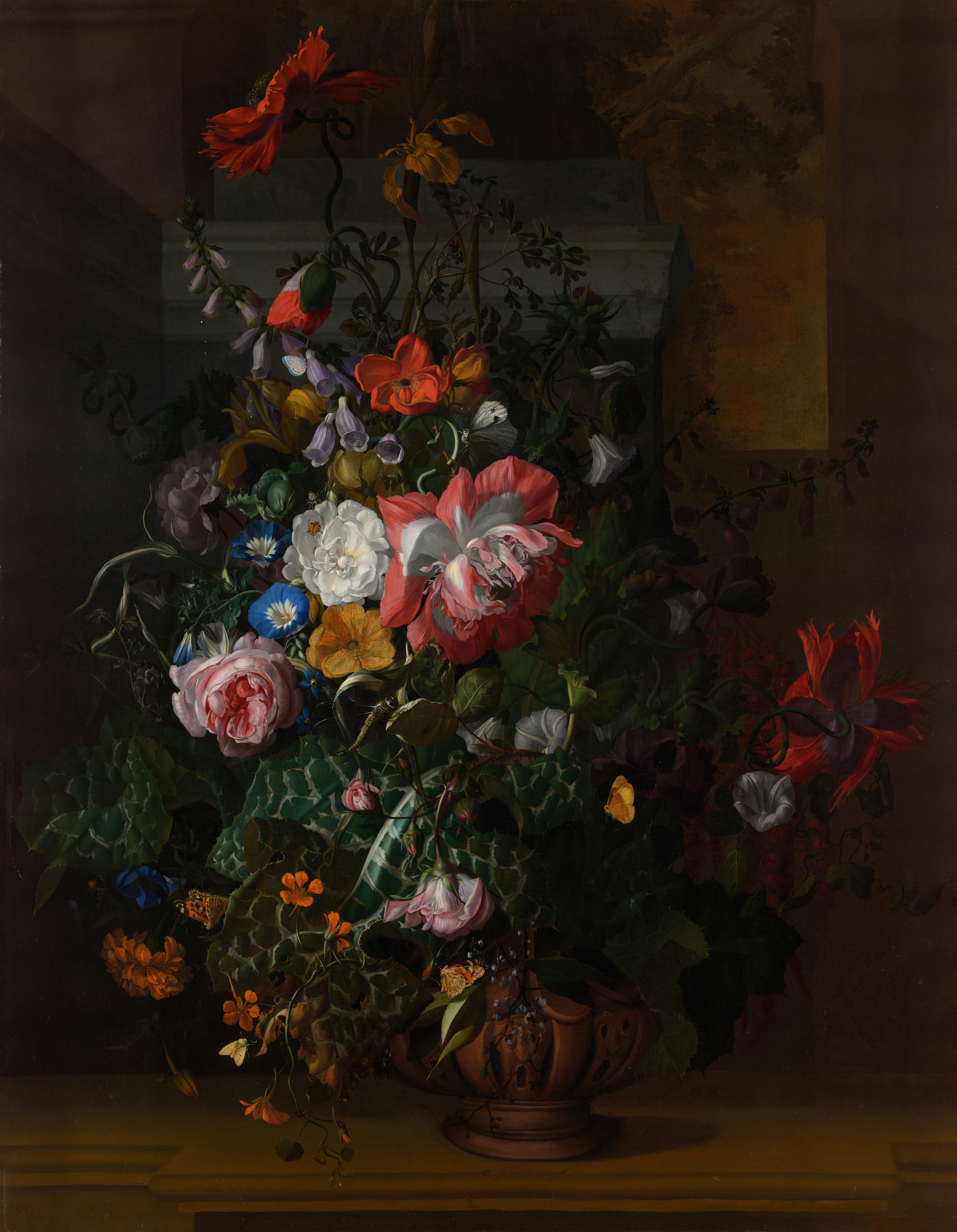
Roses, Convolvulus, Poppies, and Other Flowers in an Urn on a Stone Ledge, 1680s

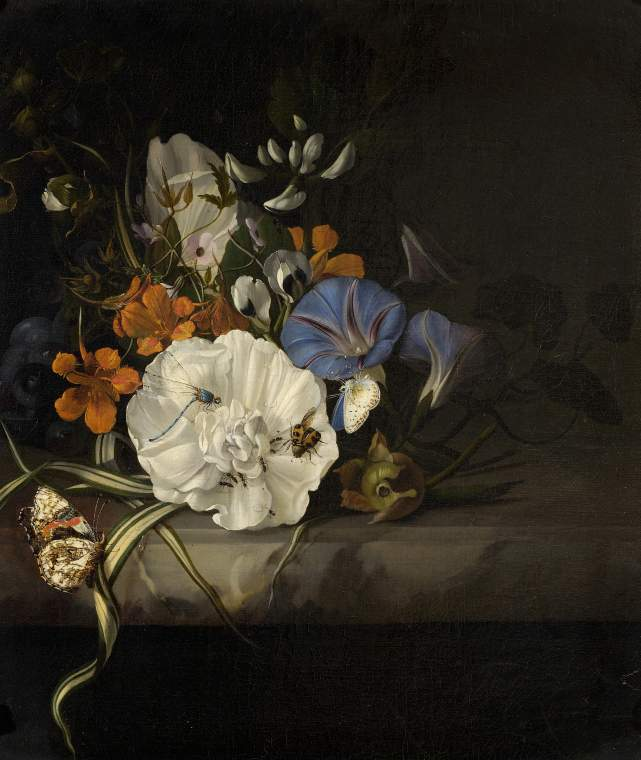
Posy of flowers, with insects and butterflies, on a marble ledge, 1690s

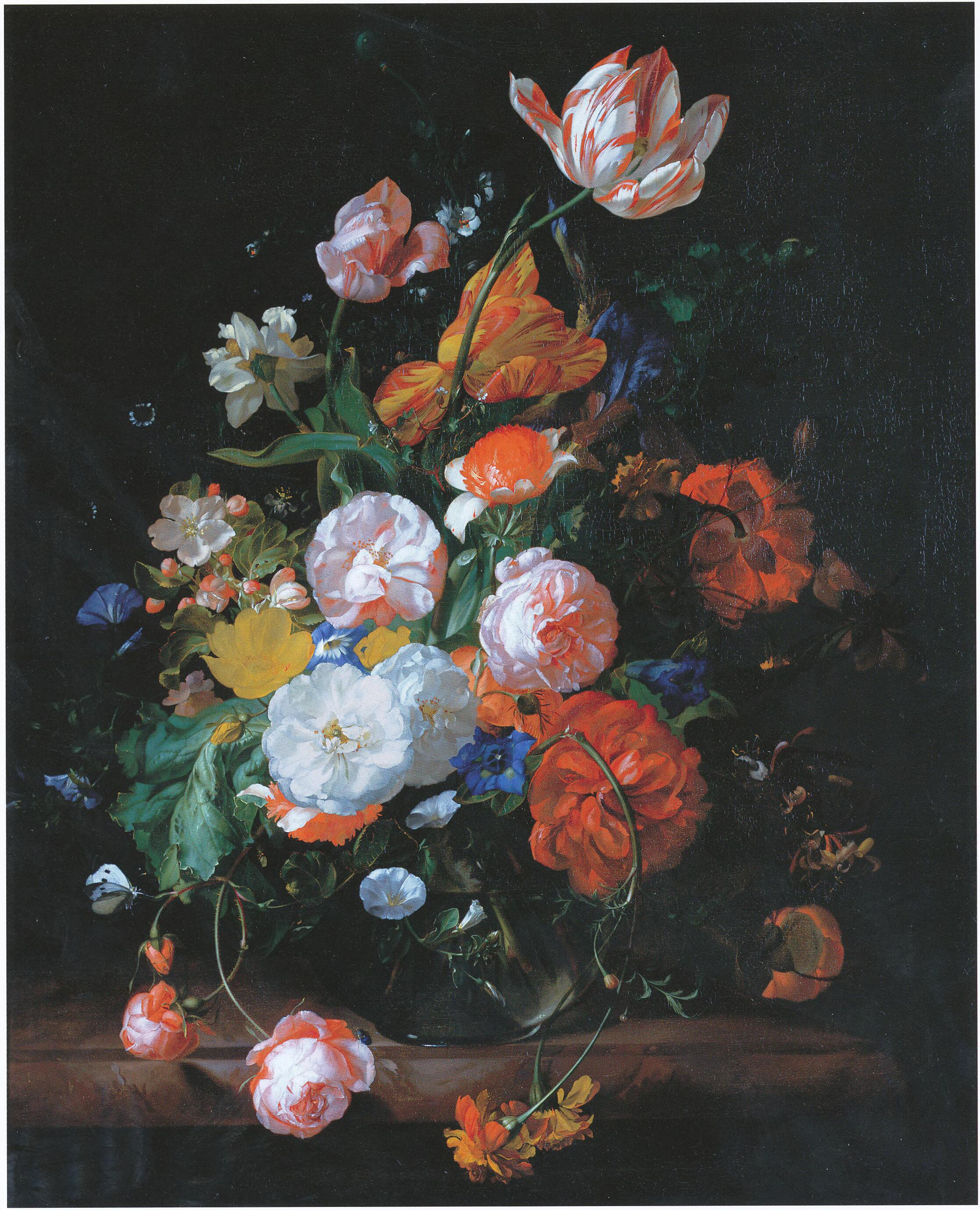
Roses, tulips and other flowers in a glass vase on a marble ledge, 1709

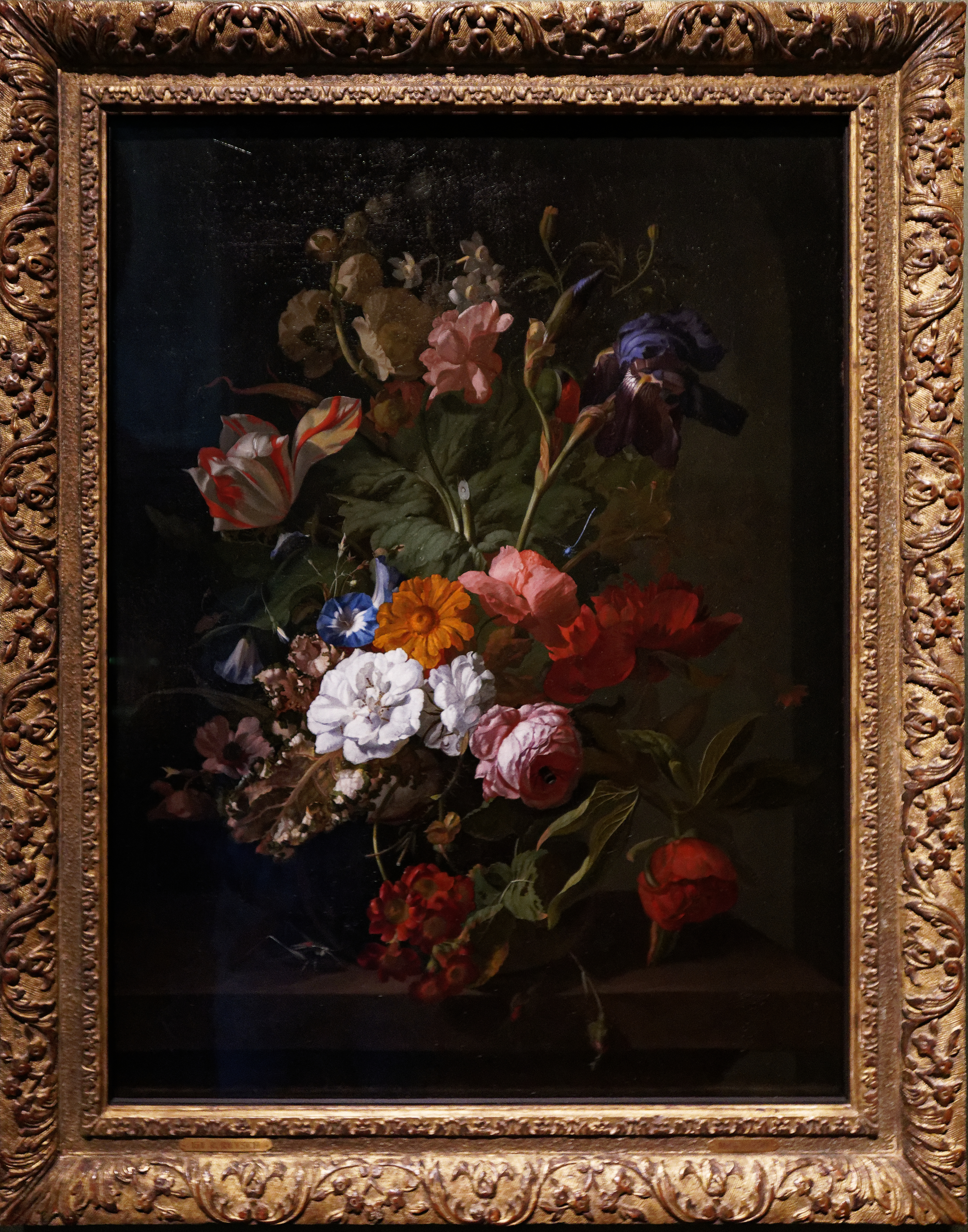
Vase with Flowers, 1700. Currently on display at the Mauritshuis in The Hague.
