= Lucas Cranach the Elder =

German painter and printmaker (1472–1553)

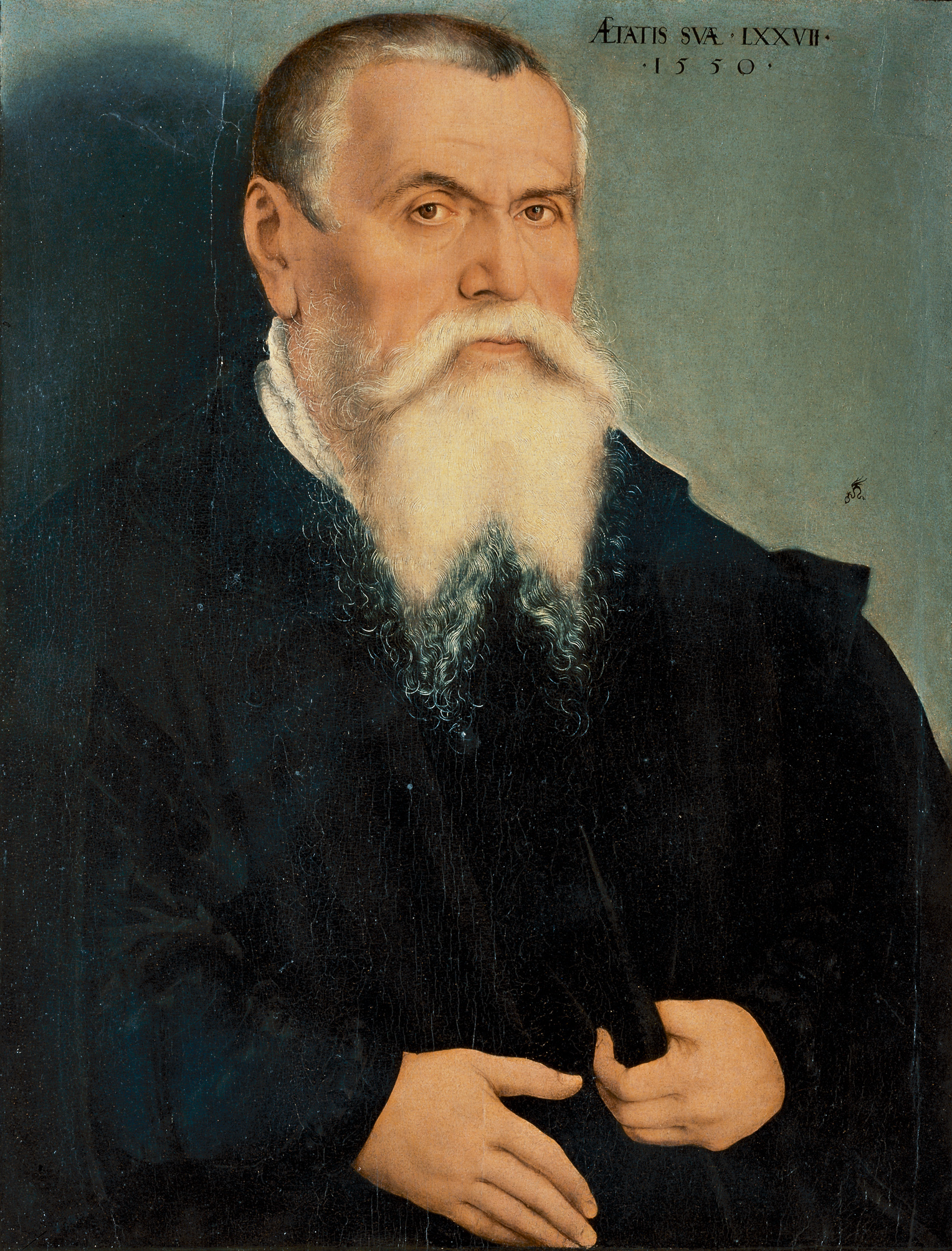
- Portrait of Lucas Cranach the Elder by Lucas Cranach the Younger, 1550
- Born: Lucas Maler c. 1472; Kronach, Prince-Bishopric of Bamberg, Holy Roman Empire
- Died: 16 October 1553 (aged 80–81); Weimar, Duchy of Saxony, Holy Roman Empire
- Known for: Painting
- Movement: German Renaissance
- Children: 5, including Hans and Lucas
- Patrons: Electors of Saxony

Lucas Cranach the Elder (German: Lucas Cranach der Ältere [ˈluːkas ˈkʁaːnax deːɐ̯ ˈʔɛltəʁə]; c. 1472 – 16 October 1553) was a German Renaissance painter and printmaker in woodcut and engraving. He was court painter to the Electors of Saxony for most of his career, and is known for his portraits, both of German princes and leaders of the Protestant Reformation, whose cause he embraced with enthusiasm. He was a close friend of Martin Luther, and eleven portraits of that reformer by him survive. Cranach also painted religious subjects, first in the Catholic tradition, and later trying to find new ways of conveying Lutheran religious concerns in art. He continued to paint nude subjects from mythology and religion throughout his career.

Cranach had a large workshop and many of his works exist in different versions; his son Lucas Cranach the Younger and others continued to create versions of his father's works for decades after his death. He has been considered the most successful German artist of his time.

== Early and personal life ==
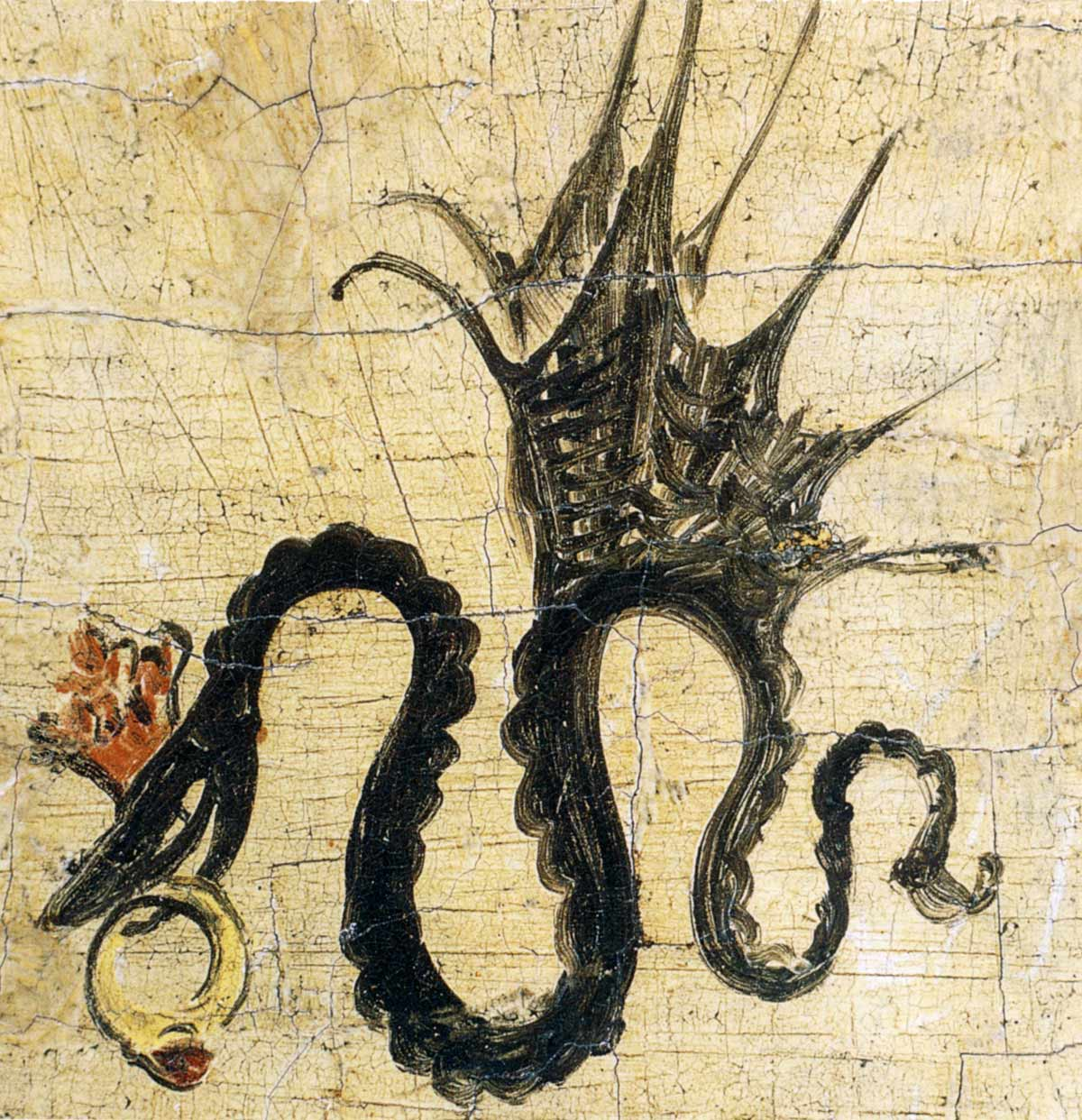
Signature of Cranach the Elder from 1508 on a winged snake with ruby ring, depicted in a 1514 portrait

He was born at Kronach in upper Franconia (now central Germany), probably in 1472. His exact date of birth is unknown. He learned the art of drawing from his father Hans Maler (his surname meaning "painter" and denoting his profession, not his ancestry, after the manner of the time and class). His mother, with surname Hübner, died in 1491. Later, a variant of the name of his birthplace was used for his surname, another custom of the times. Where Cranach was trained is not known, but it was probably with local south German masters, as with his contemporary Matthias Grünewald, who worked at Bamberg and Aschaffenburg (Bamberg is the capital of the diocese in which Kronach lies). There are also suggestions that Cranach spent some time in Vienna around 1500. From 1504 to 1520, he lived in a house on the south west corner of the marketplace in Wittenberg.

According to Gunderam (the tutor of Cranach's children), Cranach demonstrated his talents as a painter before the close of the 15th century. His work then drew the attention of Duke Frederick III, Elector of Saxony, known as Frederick the Wise, who attached Cranach to his court in 1504. The records of Wittenberg confirm Gunderam's statement to this extent: that Cranach's name appears for the first time in the public accounts on the 24 June 1504, when he drew 50 gulden for the salary of half a year, as pictor ducalis ("the duke's painter"). Cranach was to remain in the service of the Elector and his successors for the rest of his life, although he was able to undertake other work.

Cranach married Barbara Brengbier, the daughter of a burgher of Gotha and also born there; she died at Wittenberg on 26 December 1540. Cranach later owned a house at Gotha, but most likely he got to know Barbara near Wittenberg, where her family also owned a house, which later also belonged to Cranach. Cranach had two sons, both artists: Hans Cranach, whose life is obscure and who died in Bologna in 1537; and Lucas Cranach the Younger, born in 1515, who died in 1586. He also had three daughters. One of them was Barbara Cranach, who died in 1569, married Christian Brück (Pontanus), and was an ancestor of Johann Wolfgang von Goethe. His granddaughter married Polykarp Leyser the Elder, thus making him an ancestor of the Polykarp Leyser family of theologians.

== Career ==
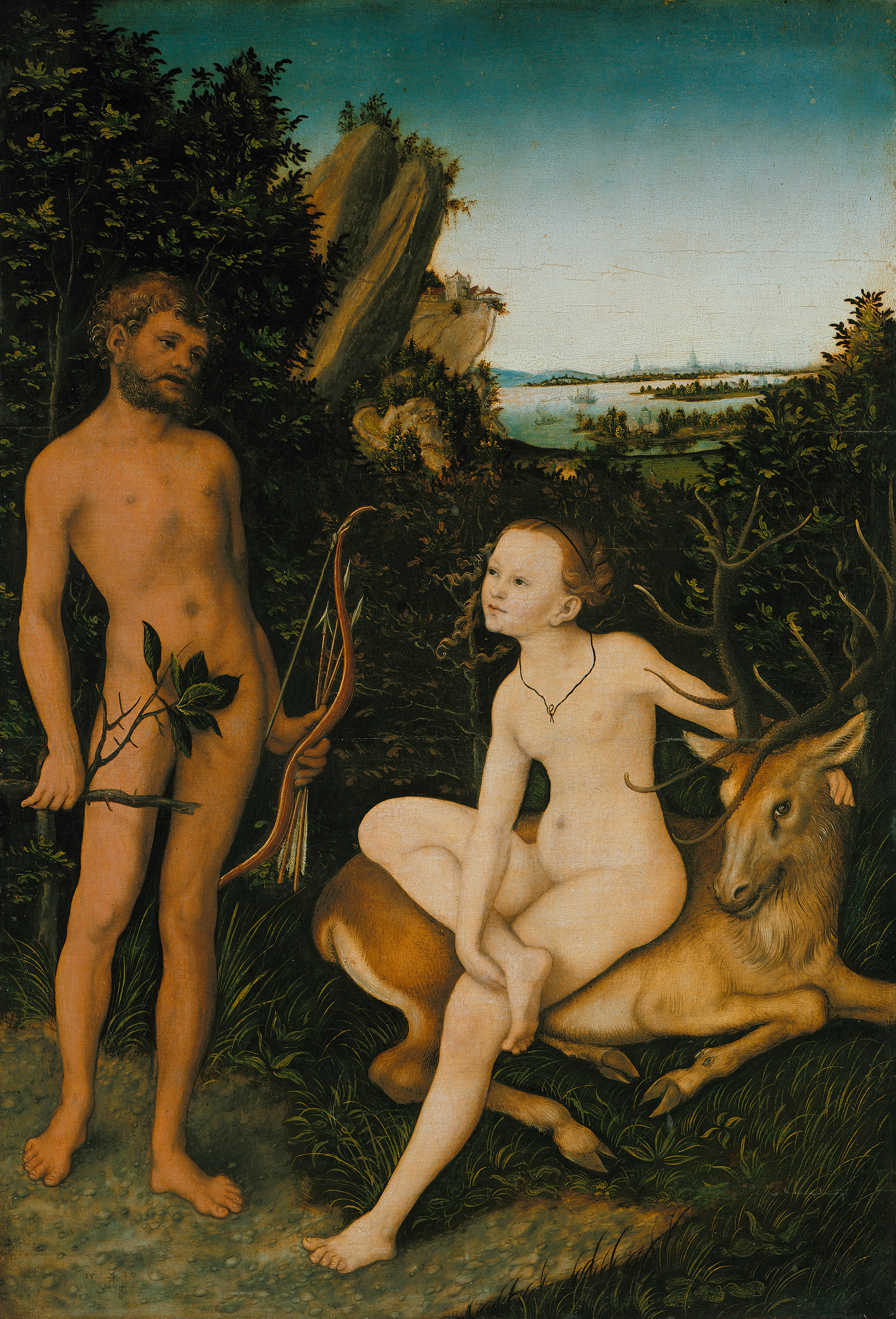
Apollo and Diana, 1530

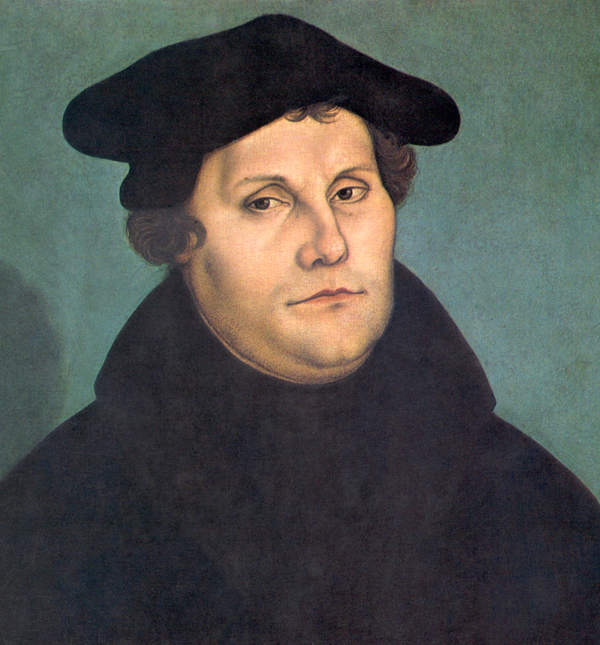
Portrait of Martin Luther, 1529

The first evidence of Cranach's skill as an artist comes in a picture dated 1504. Early in his career he was active in several branches of his profession: sometimes a decorative painter, more frequently producing portraits and altarpieces, woodcuts, engravings, and designing the coins for the electorate.

Early in the days of his official employment he startled his master's courtiers by the realism with which he painted still life, game and antlers on the walls of the country palaces at Coburg and Locha; his pictures of deer and wild boar were considered striking, and the duke fostered his passion for this form of art by taking him out to the hunting field, where he sketched "his grace" running the stag, or Duke John sticking a boar.

Before 1508 he had painted several altar-pieces for the Castle Church at Wittenberg in competition with Albrecht Dürer, Hans Burgkmair and others; the duke and his brother John were portrayed in various attitudes and a number of his best woodcuts and copper-plates were published.

In 1509 Cranach went to the Netherlands, and painted the Emperor Maximilian and the boy who afterwards became Emperor Charles V. Until 1508 Cranach signed his works with his initials. In that year the elector gave him the winged snake as an emblem, or Kleinod, which superseded the initials on his pictures after that date.

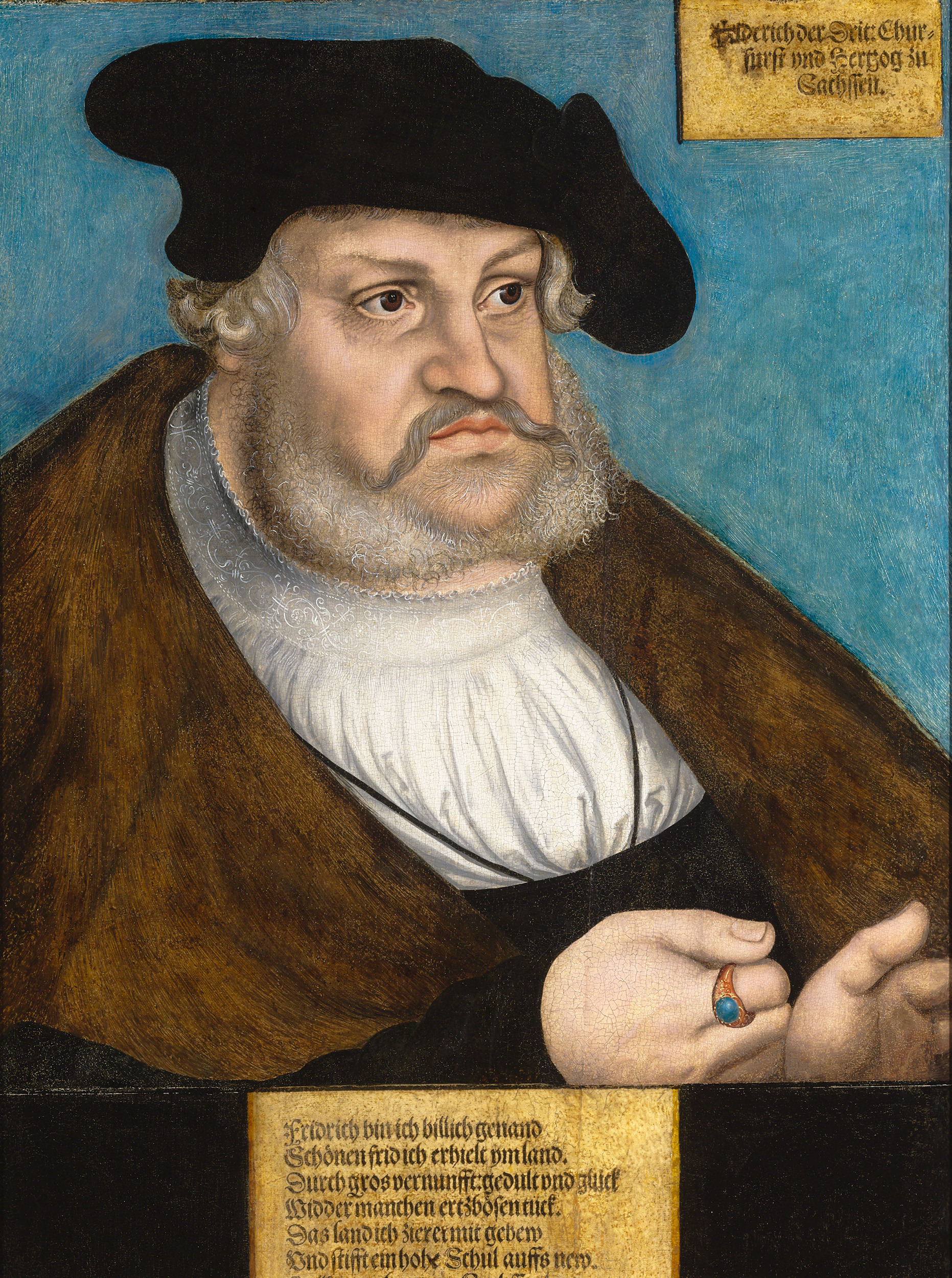
Portrait of Frederick III, Elector of Saxony, c. 1530–1535

Cranach was the court painter from 1505 to 1550 to the electors of Saxony in Wittenberg, an area in the heart of the emerging Protestant faith. His patrons were powerful supporters of Martin Luther, and Cranach used his art as a symbol of the new faith. Cranach made numerous portraits of Luther, and provided woodcut illustrations for Luther's German translation of the Bible. Somewhat later the duke conferred on him the monopoly of the sale of medicines at Wittenberg, and a printer's patent with exclusive privileges as to copyright in Bibles. Cranach's presses were used by Martin Luther. His apothecary shop was open for centuries, and was only lost by fire in 1871.

Cranach, like his patron, was friendly with the Protestant Reformers at a very early stage; yet it is difficult to fix the time of his first meeting with Martin Luther. The oldest reference to Cranach in Luther's correspondence dates from 1520. In a letter written from Worms in 1521, Luther calls him his "gossip", warmly alluding to his "Gevatterin", the artist's wife. Cranach first made an engraving of Luther in 1520, when Luther was an Augustinian friar; five years later, Luther renounced his religious vows, and Cranach was present as a witness at the betrothal festival of Luther and Katharina von Bora. He was also godfather to their first child, Johannes "Hans" Luther, born 1526. In 1530 Luther lived at the citadel of Veste Coburg under the protection of the Duke of Saxe-Coburg and his room is preserved there along with a painting of him. The Dukes became noted collectors of Cranach's work, some of which remains in the family collection at Callenberg Castle.

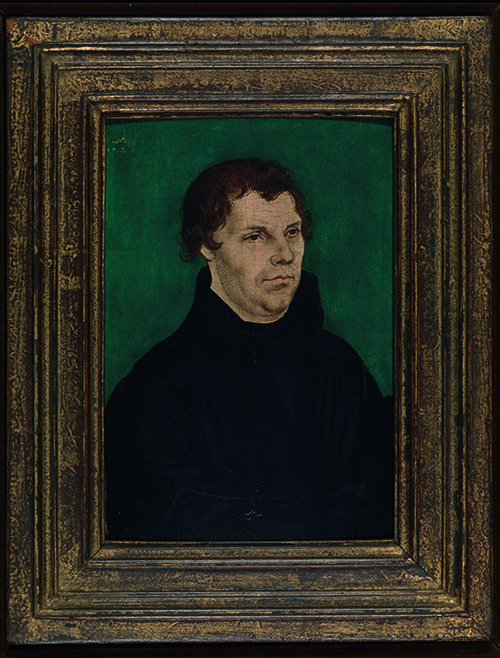
Portrait of Martin Luther, 1526, The Phoebus Foundation

The death in 1525 of the Elector Frederick the Wise and Elector John's in 1532 brought no change in Cranach's position; he remained a favourite with John Frederick I, under whom he twice (1531 and 1540) filled the office of burgomaster of Wittenberg. In 1547, John Frederick was taken prisoner at the Battle of Mühlberg, and Wittenberg was besieged. As Cranach wrote from his house to the grand-master Albert, Duke of Prussia at Königsberg to tell him of John Frederick's capture, he showed his attachment by saying,

I cannot conceal from your Grace that we have been robbed of our dear prince, who from his youth upwards has been a true prince to us, but God will help him out of prison, for the Kaiser is bold enough to revive the Papacy, which God will certainly not allow.

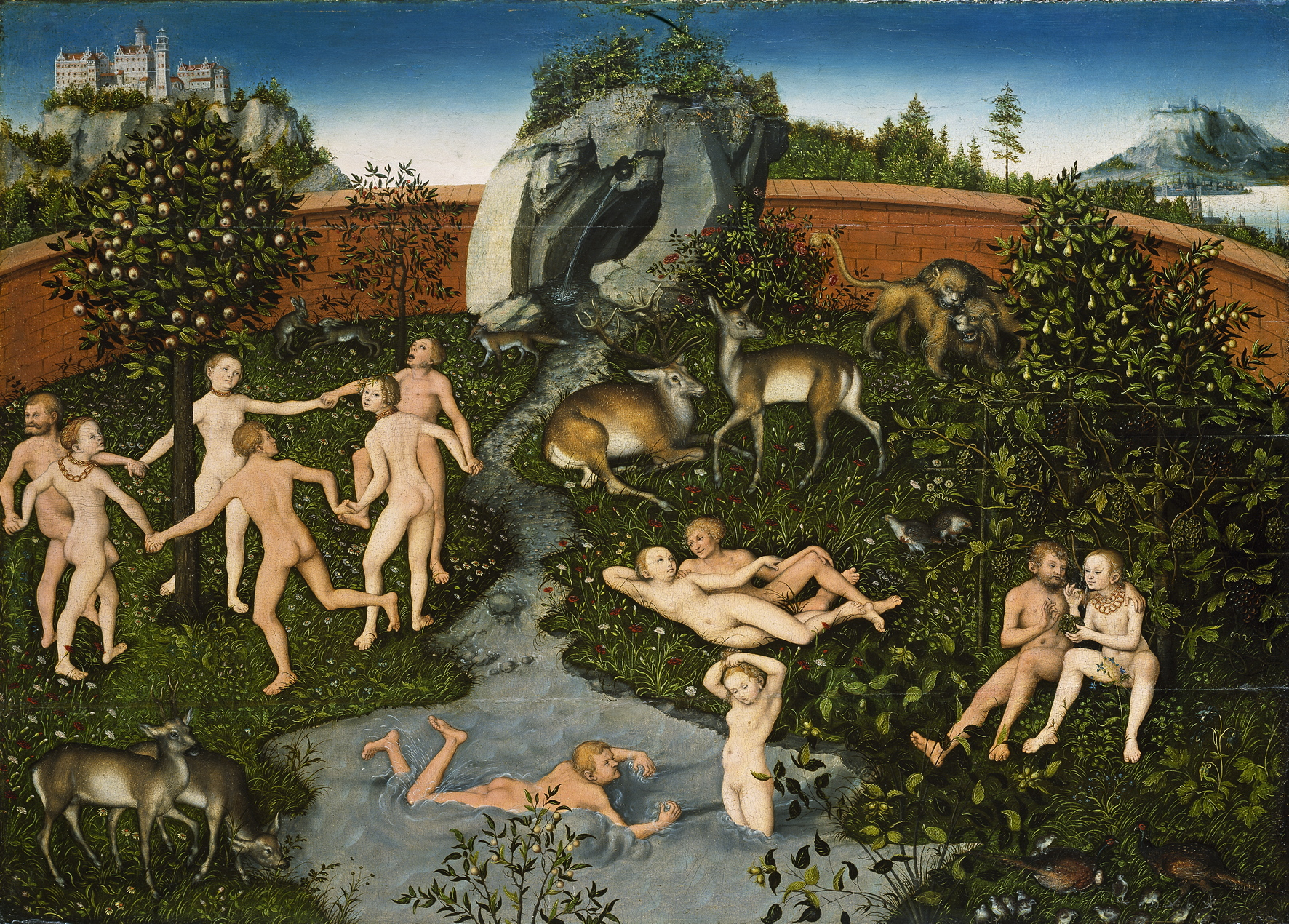
The Golden Age, 1530, National Museum of Art, Architecture and Design

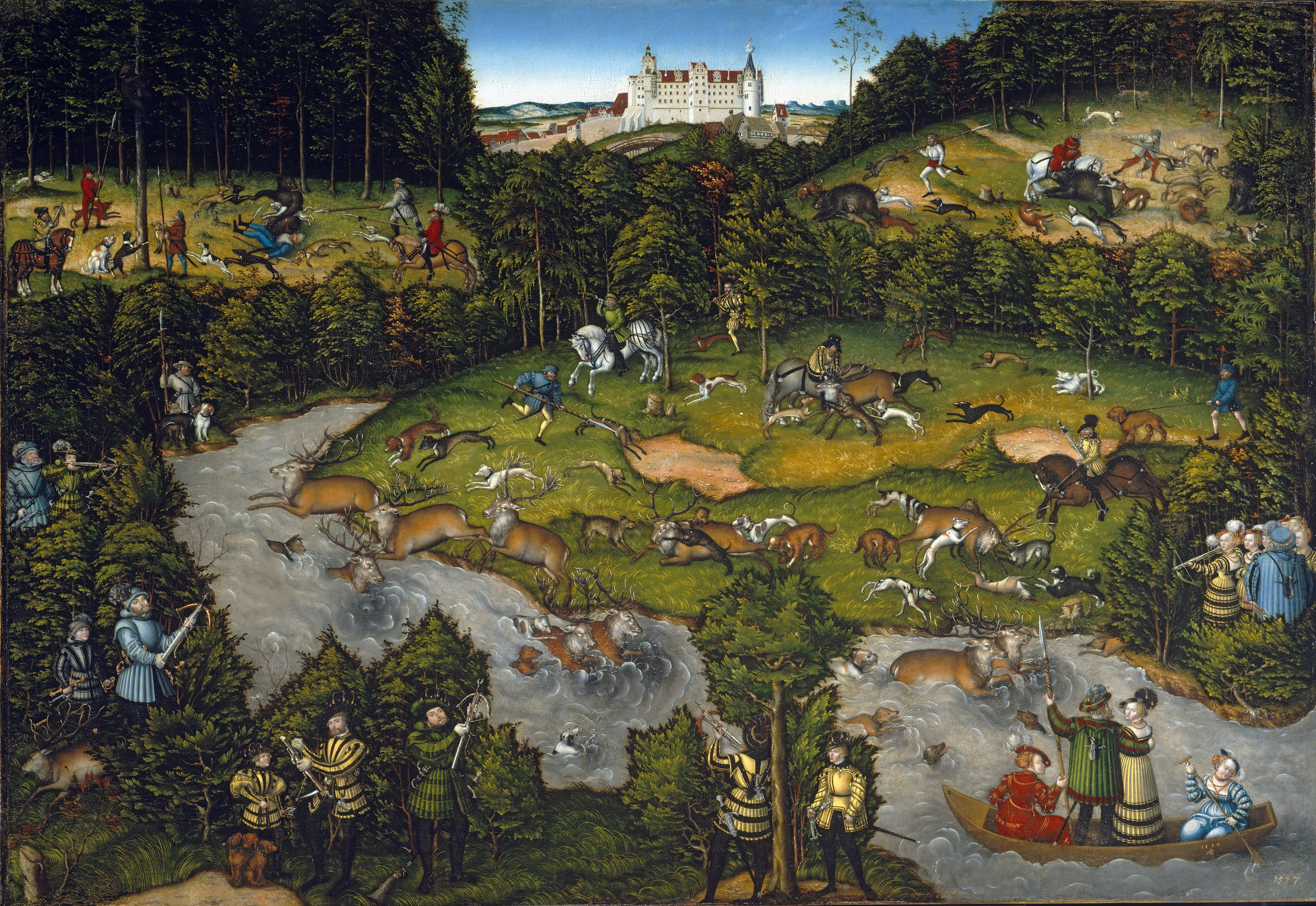
Hunting near Hartenfels castle, 1540

During the siege Charles V, the Holy Roman Emperor, remembered Cranach from his childhood and summoned him to his camp at Pistritz. Cranach came, and begged on his knees for kind treatment for Elector John Frederick.

Three years afterward, when all the dignitaries of the Empire met at Augsburg to receive commands from the emperor, and Titian came at Charles's bidding to paint King Philip II of Spain, John Frederick asked Cranach to visit the city; and here for a few months he stayed in the household of the captive elector, whom he afterward accompanied home in 1552.

== Death and veneration ==
He died at age 81 on 16 October 1553, at Weimar, where the house in which he lived still stands in the marketplace. He was buried in the Jacobsfriedhof in Weimar.

The Lutheran Church remembers Cranach as a great Christian on 6 April along with Dürer, and possibly Grünewald or Burgkmair.

== Works and art ==
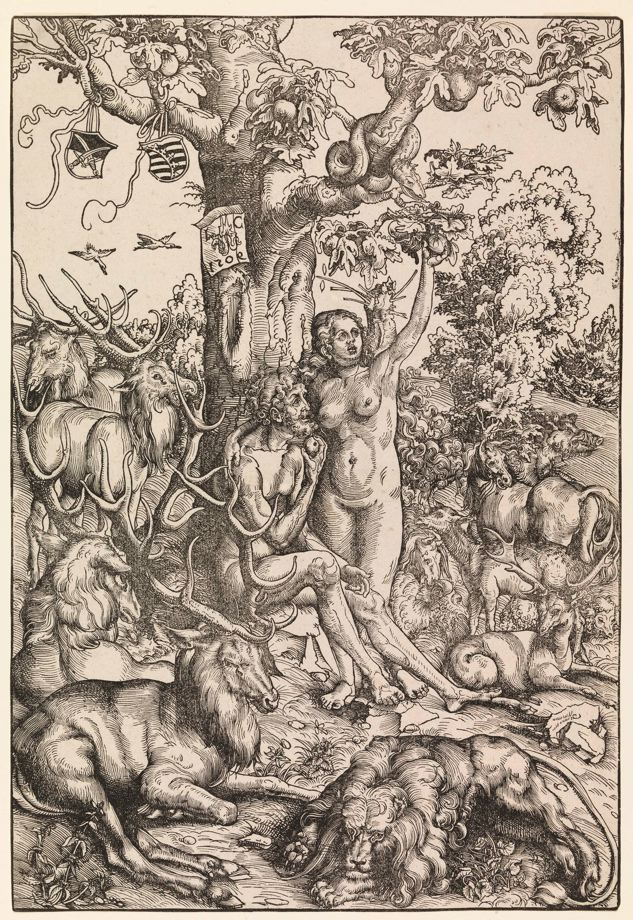
Adam and Eve, woodcut, 1509

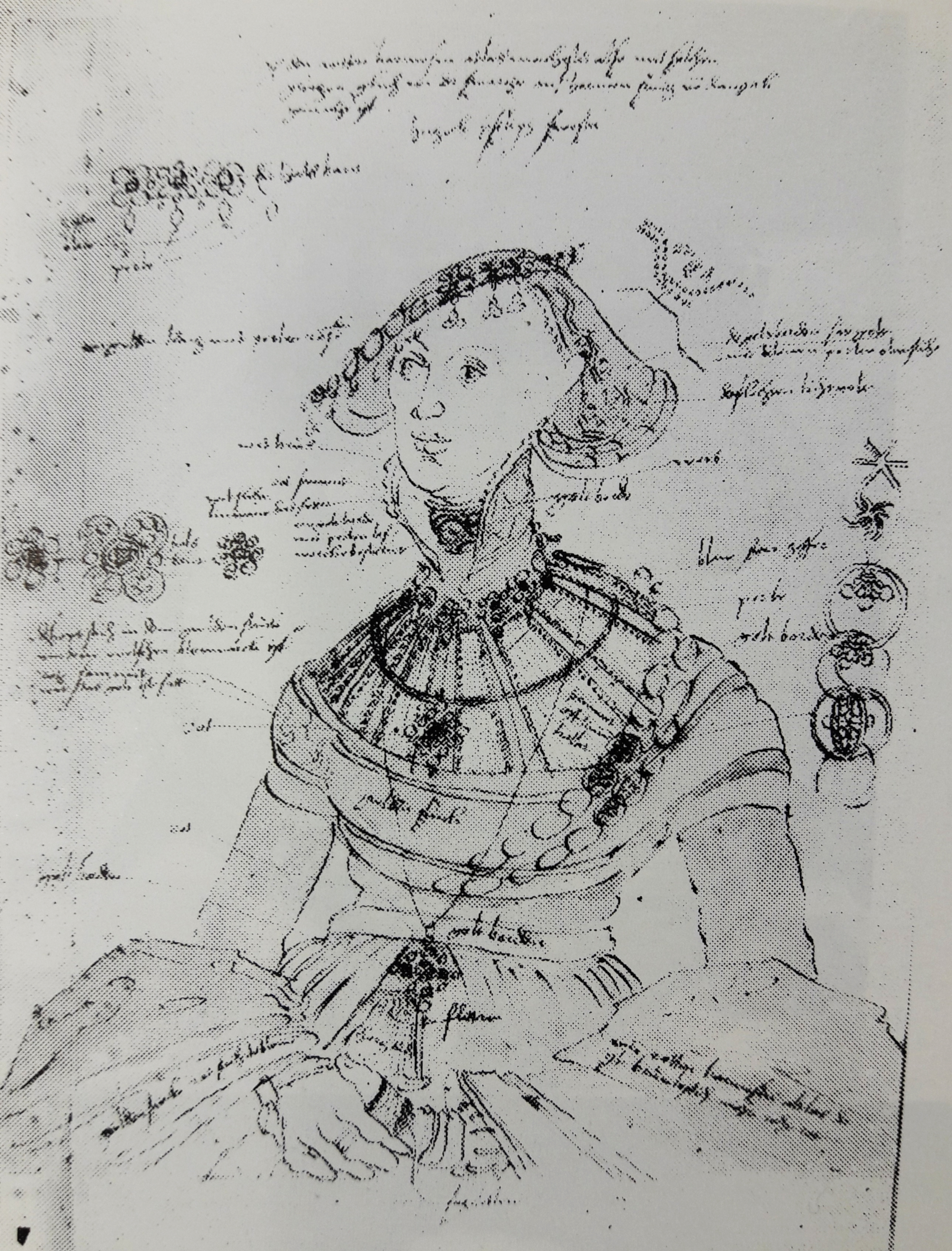
Study for portrait of Margaret of Pomerania (1518–1569), c. 1545, a drawing with all details of the sitter's costume meticulously described, was intended for the future reference and to facilitate the work on large number of commissions in the artist's atelier.

The oldest extant picture by Cranach is the Rest of the Virgin during the Flight into Egypt, of 1504. The painting already shows remarkable skill and grace, and the pine forest in the background shows a painter familiar with the mountain scenery of Thuringia. There is more forest gloom in landscapes of a later time.

Following the huge international success of Dürer's prints, other German artists, much more than Italian ones, devoted their talents to woodcuts and engravings. This accounts for the comparative unproductiveness as painters of Albrecht Dürer and Hans Holbein the Younger, and also may explain why Cranach was not especially skilled at handling colour, light, and shade. Constant attention to contour and to black and white, as an engraver, seems to have affected his sight; and he often outlined shapes in black rather than employing modelling and chiaroscuro.

The largest proportion of Cranach's output is of portraits, and it is chiefly thanks to him that we know what the German Reformers and their princely adherents looked like. He painted not only Martin Luther himself but also Luther's wife, mother and father. He also depicted leading Catholics like Albert of Brandenburg, archbishop elector of Mainz, Anthony Granvelle and the Duke of Alva.

A dozen likenesses of Frederick III and his brother John are dated 1532. It is characteristic of Cranach's prolific output, and a proof that he used a large workshop, that he received payment at Wittenberg in 1533 for "sixty pairs of portraits of the elector and his brother" on one day. Inevitably the quality of such works is variable.

=== Religious subjects ===
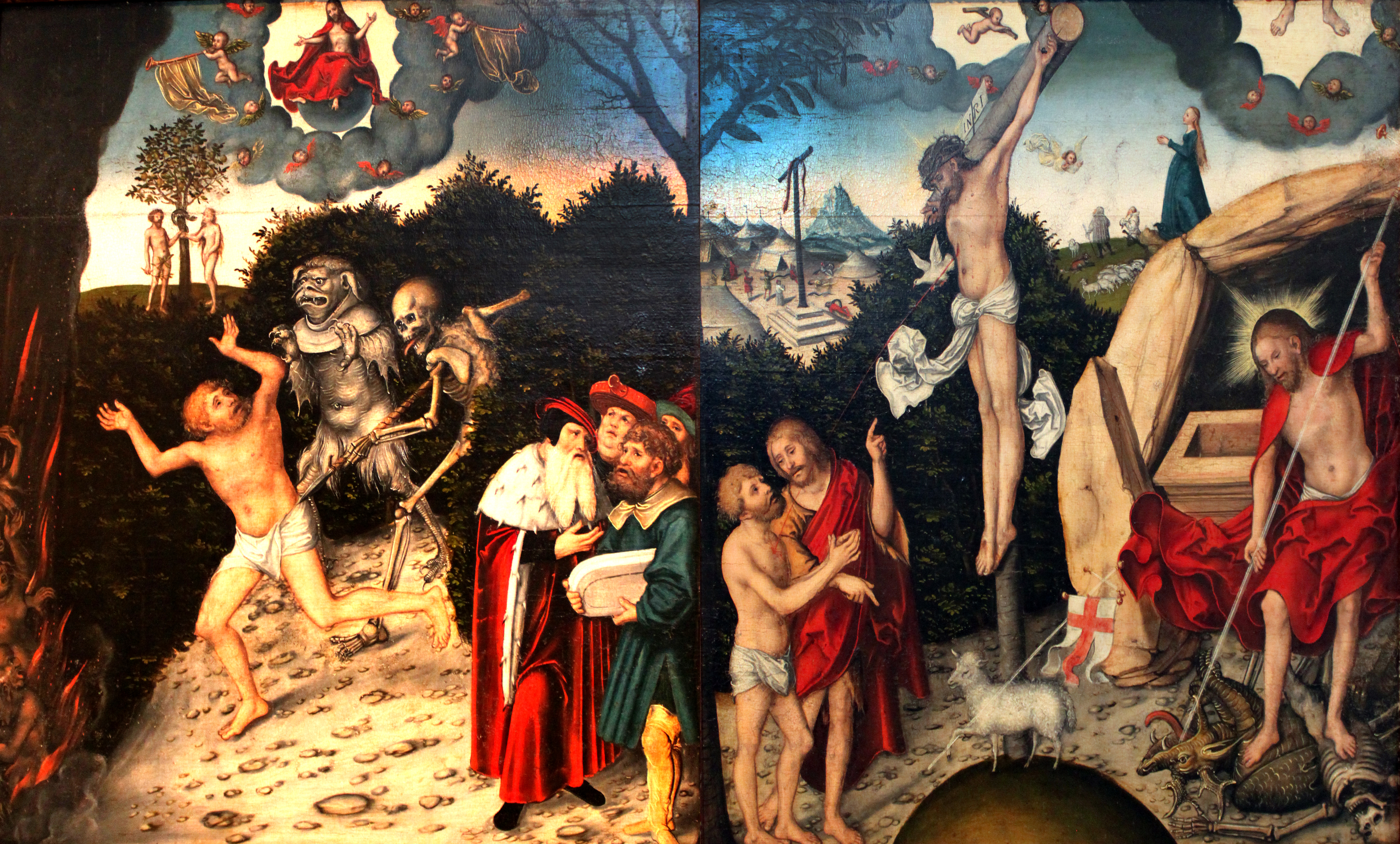
Allegory of Law and Grace, c. 1529

Cranach's religious subjects reflect the development of the Protestant Reformation, and its attitudes to religious images. In his early career, he painted several Madonnas; his first woodcut (1505) represents the Virgin and three saints in prayer before a crucifix. Between 1517 and 1519, he painted an altarpiece for the Altar of Mary at Naumburg Cathedral. The central panel, which depicted the Virgin Mary was destroyed in 1541 during the protestant Bilderstorm. Later on he painted the marriage of St. Catherine, a series of martyrdoms, and scenes from the Passion.

After 1517 he occasionally illustrated the old subjects, but he also gave expression to some of the thoughts of the Reformers, although his portraits of reformers were more common than paintings of religious scenes. In a picture of 1518, where a dying man offers "his soul to God, his body to earth, and his worldly goods to his relations", the soul rises to meet the Trinity in heaven, and salvation is clearly shown to depend on faith and not on good works.

Other works of this period deal with sin and divine grace. One shows Adam sitting between John the Baptist and a prophet at the foot of a tree. To the left God produces the tables of the law, Adam and Eve taste the forbidden fruit, the serpent raises its head, and punishment manifests in the shape of death and the realm of Satan. To the right, the Conception, Crucifixion and Resurrection symbolize redemption, and this is duly impressed on Adam by John the Baptist. There are two examples of this composition in the galleries of Gotha and Prague, both of them dated 1529. His workshop made an altarpiece with a Crucifixion scene in the centre which is now in the Kreuzkirche, Hanover.

Towards the end of his life, after Luther's initial hostility to large public religious images had softened, Cranach painted a number of "Lutheran altarpieces" of the Last Supper and other subjects, in which Christ was shown in a traditional manner, including a halo, but the apostles, without halos, were portraits of leading reformers. He also produced a number of violent anti-Catholic and anti-Papacy propaganda prints in a cruder style. His best known work in this vein was a series of prints for the pamphlet Passional Christi und Antichristi, where scenes from the Passion of Christ were matched by a print mocking practices of the Catholic clergy, so that Christ driving the money-changers from the Temple was matched by the Pope, or Antichrist, signing indulgences over a table spread with cash (see gallery below). Some of the prints were echoed by paintings, such as his Adoration of the Shepherds (c. 1517).

One of his last works is the altarpiece, completed after his death by Lucas Cranach the Younger in 1555, for the Stadtkirche (city church) at Weimar. The iconography is original and unusual: Christ is shown twice, to the left trampling on Death and Satan, to the right crucified, with blood flowing from the lance wound. John the Baptist points to the suffering Christ, whilst the blood-stream falls on the head of a portrait of Cranach, and Luther reads from his book the words, "The blood of Christ cleanseth from all sin."

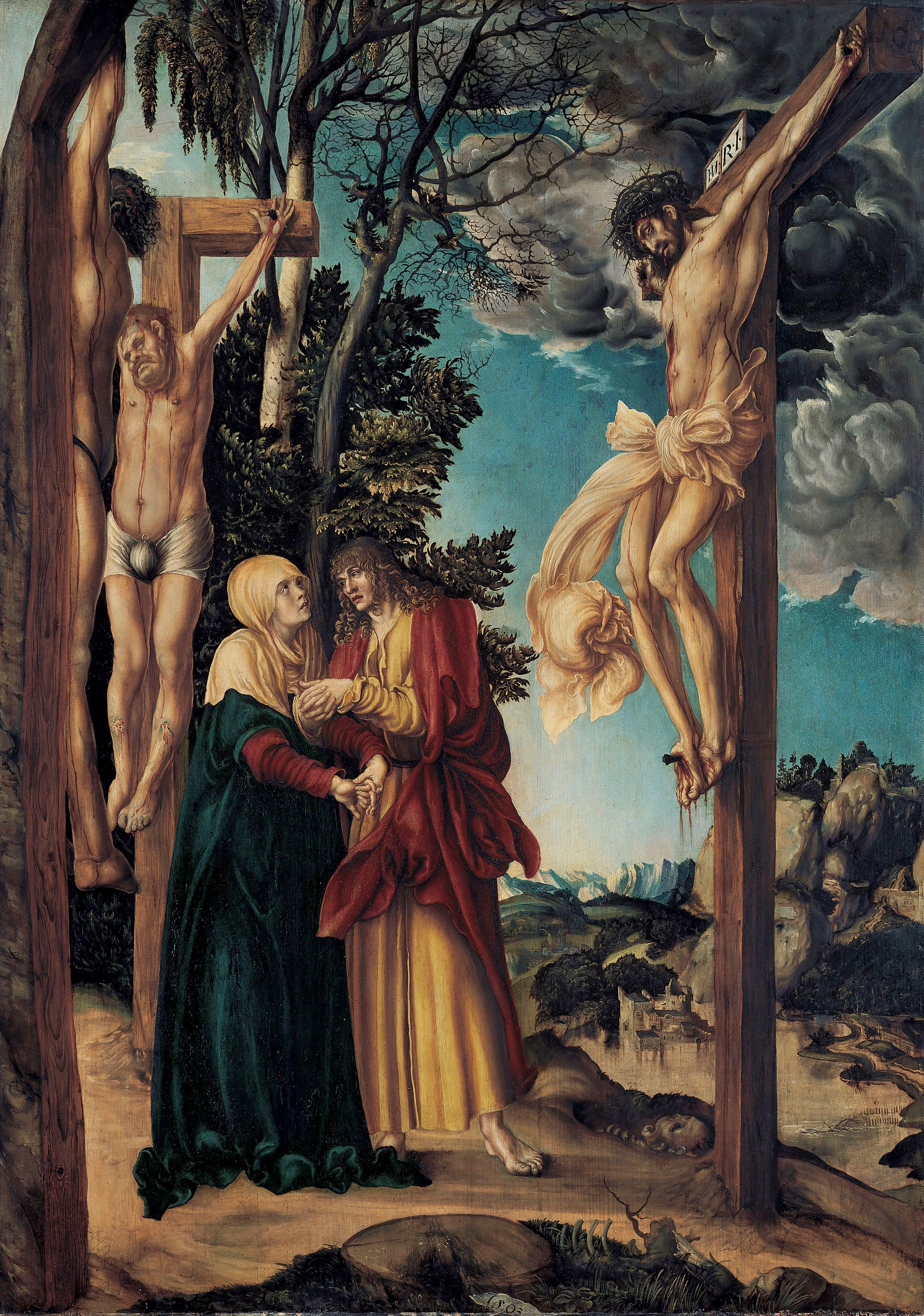
Crucifixion of Christ, 1503

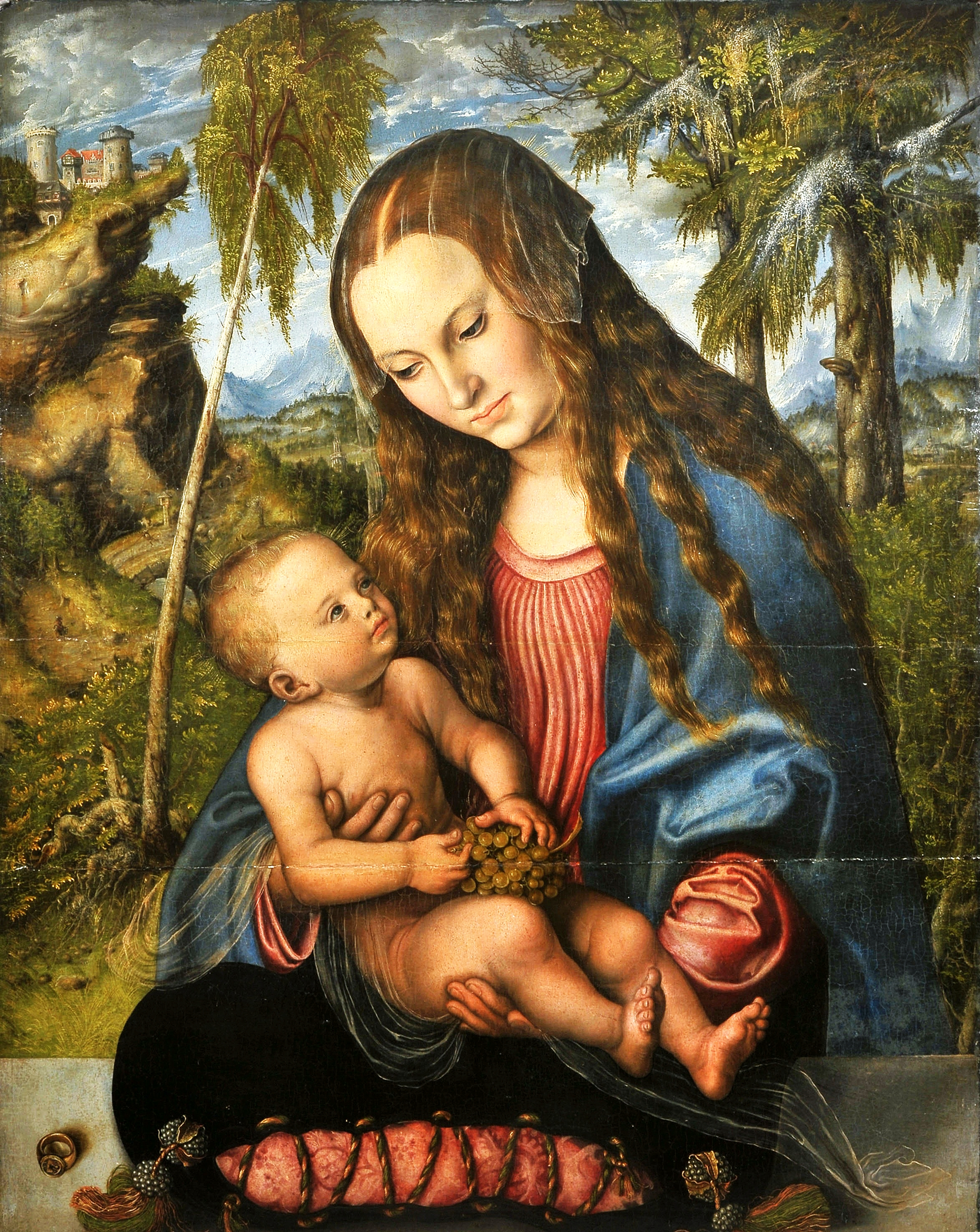
Madonna under the Fir Tree, 1510, Archdiocesan Museum, Wrocław

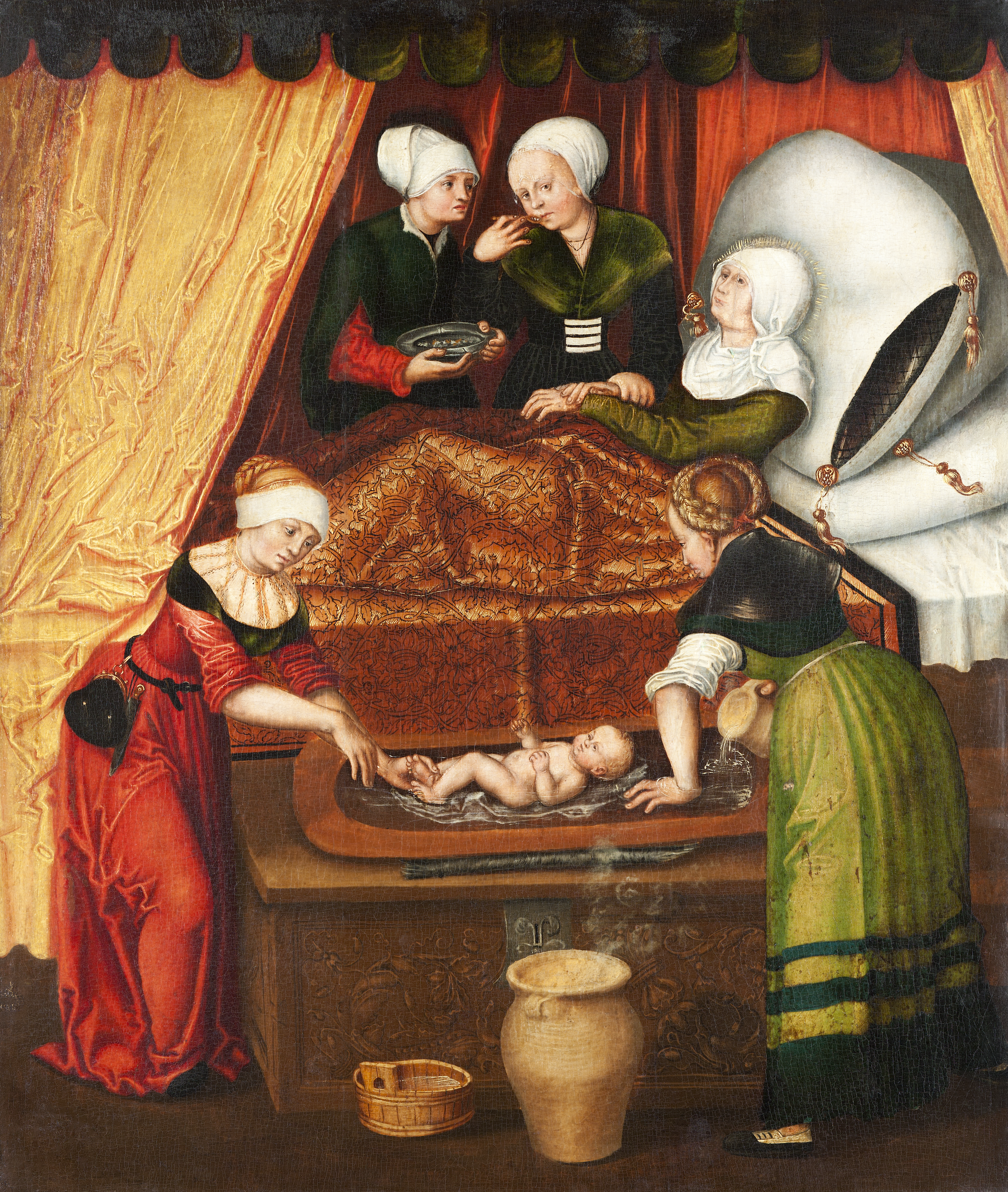
The Birth of John the Baptist, 1518

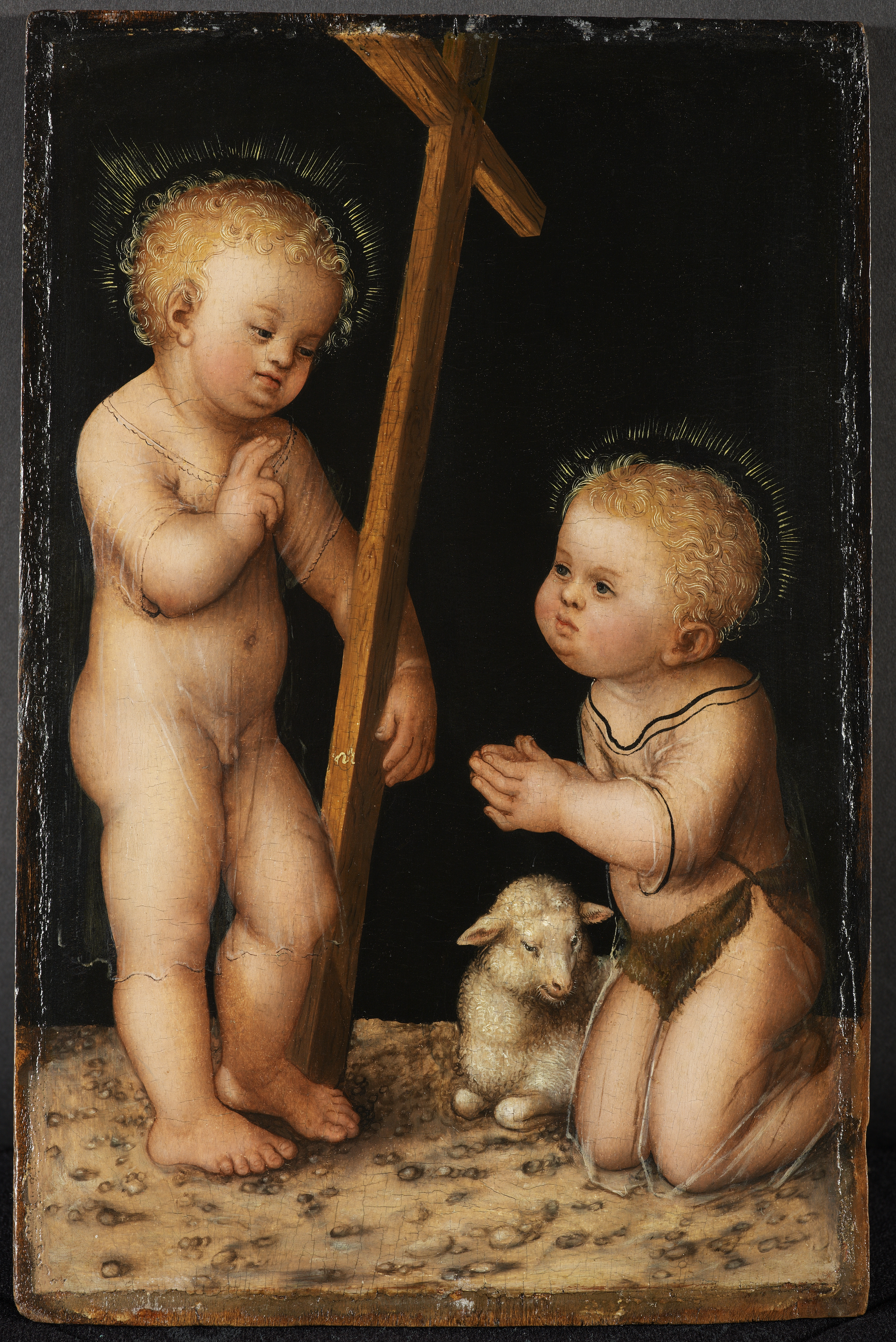
Infant Jesus and John the Baptist as Child

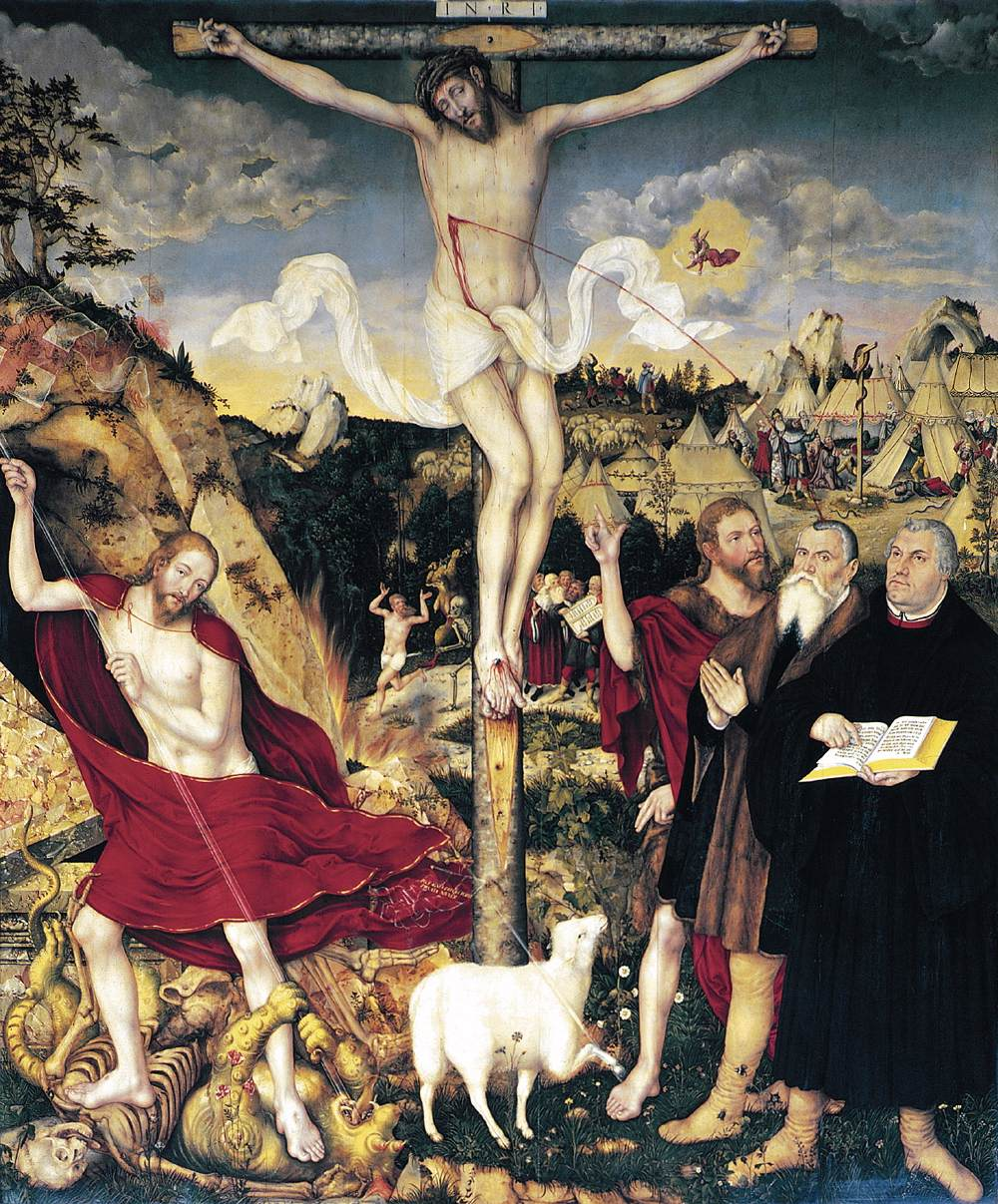
The Weimar Cranach Altarpiece by his son Lucas Cranach the Younger, 1555. Luther, with the bible in his hand, emphasises the Reformation doctrine of ‘sola scriptura’. The stream of blood flowing directly from Christ's side wound onto Cranach's head symbolises personal participation in God's work of salvation and makes the painter part of the salvation history

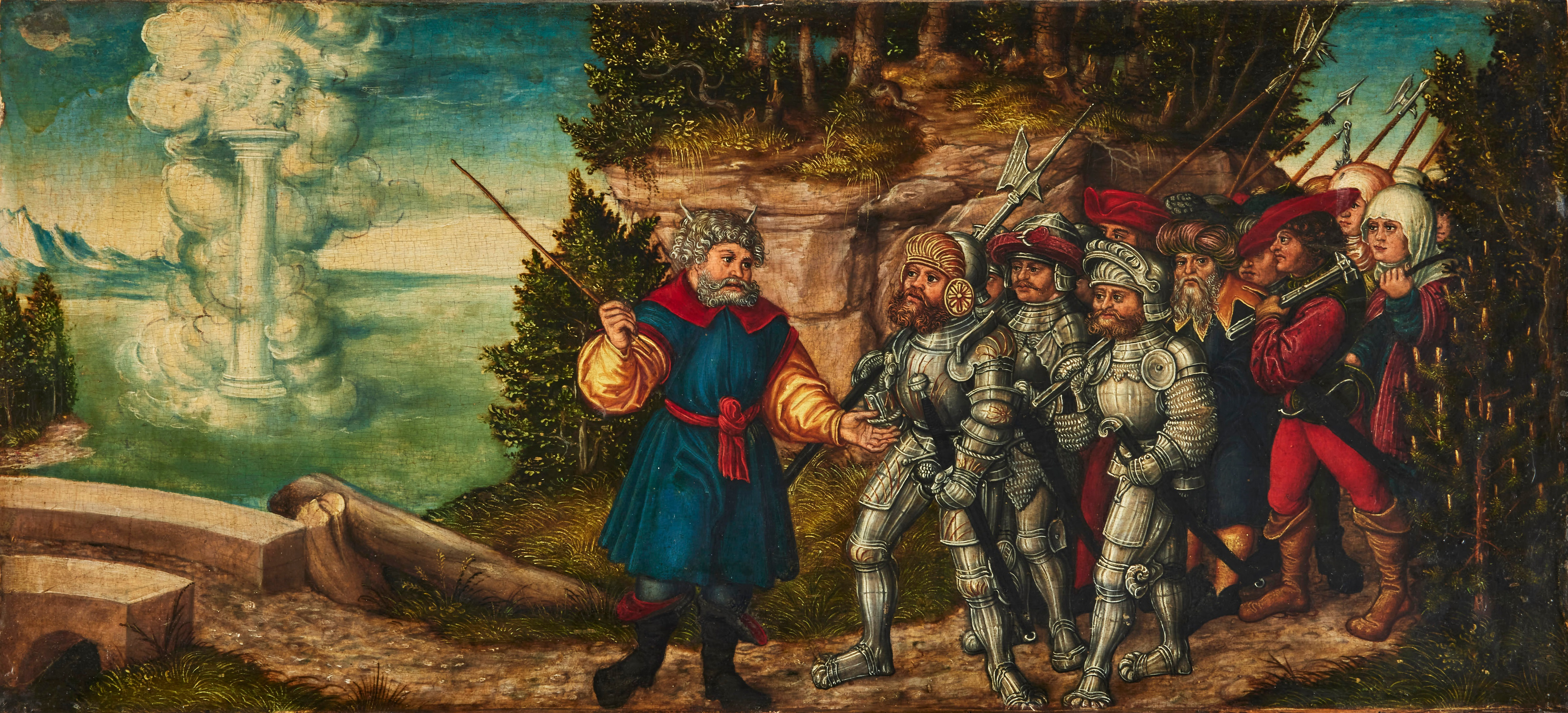
Moses and the Pillar of Cloud by Lucas Cranach the Elder and Studio. Circa 1530. Private collection.

=== Mythological scenes ===
Hercules Relieving Atlas of the Globe, c. 1530, National Gallery of Art

Cranach was equally successful in a series of paintings of mythological scenes which nearly always feature at least one slim female figure, naked but for a transparent drape or a large hat.

These are mostly in narrow upright formats; examples are several of Venus, alone or with Cupid, who has sometimes stolen a honeycomb, and complains to Venus that he has been stung by a bee (Weimar, 1530; Berlin, 1534). Other such subjects are the Three Graces, Diana with Apollo, shooting a bow, and Hercules sitting at the spinning-wheel mocked by Omphale and her maids. A similar approach was taken with the biblical subjects of Salome and Adam and Eve. He and his workshop also painted more than sixty versions of Lucretia, the self-stabbing pagan heroine whose death sparked the Roman Republic.

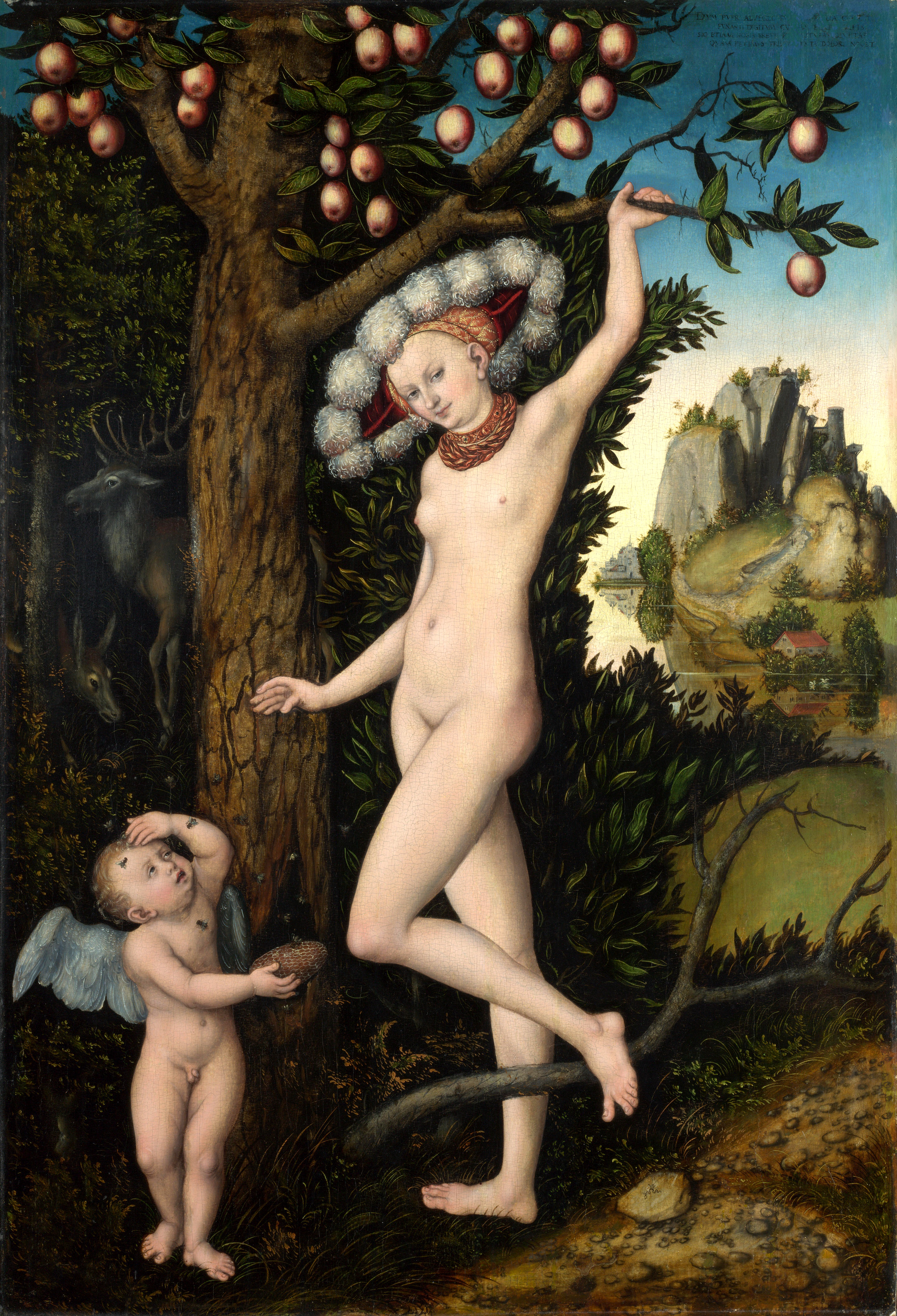
Cupid Complaining to Venus, c. 1525

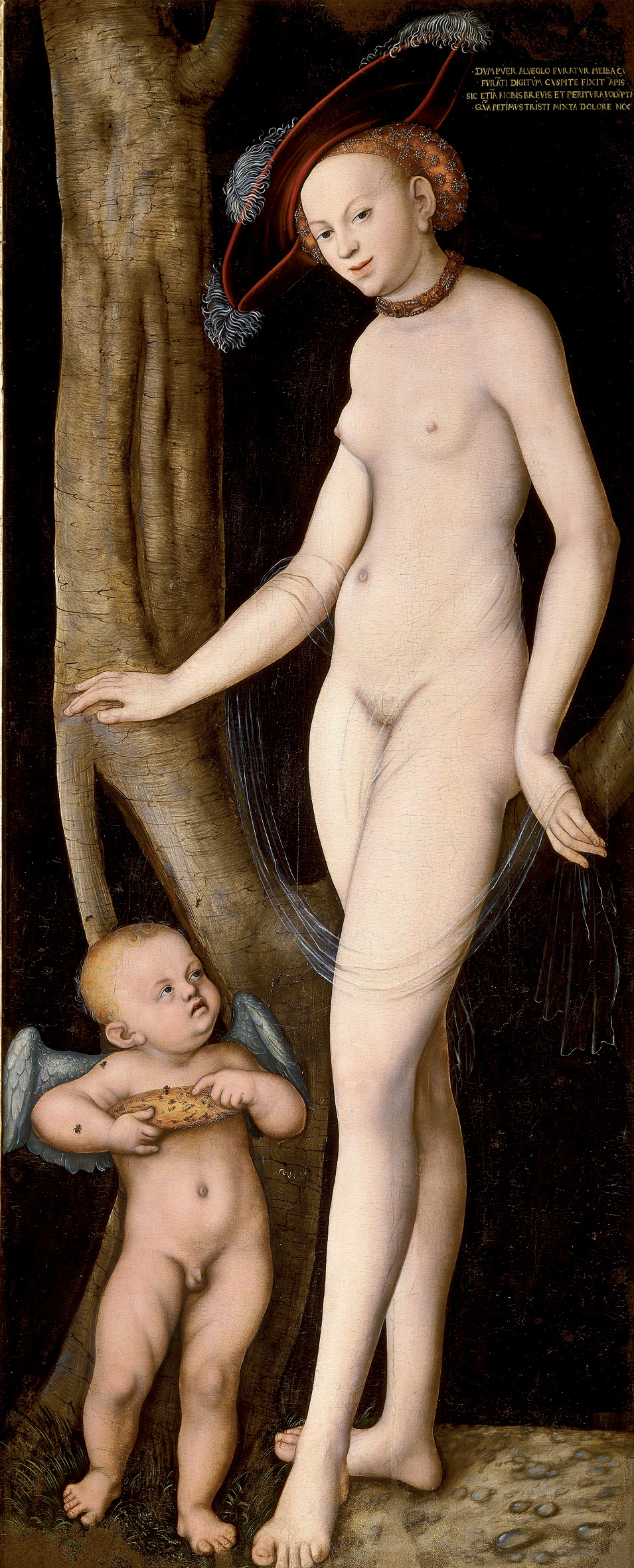
Venus and Cupid with a Honeycomb, c. 1527

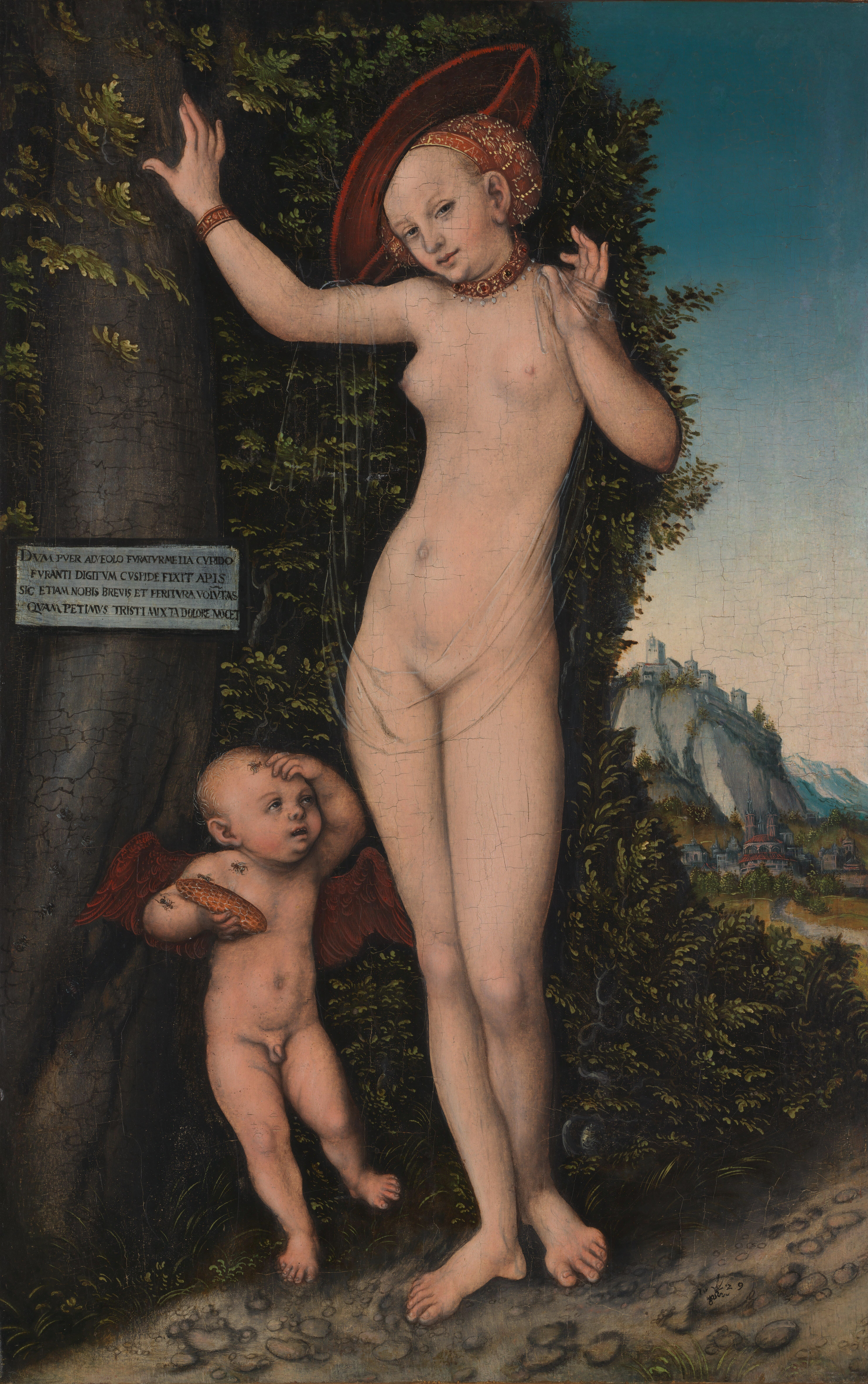
Venus and Cupid, 1529

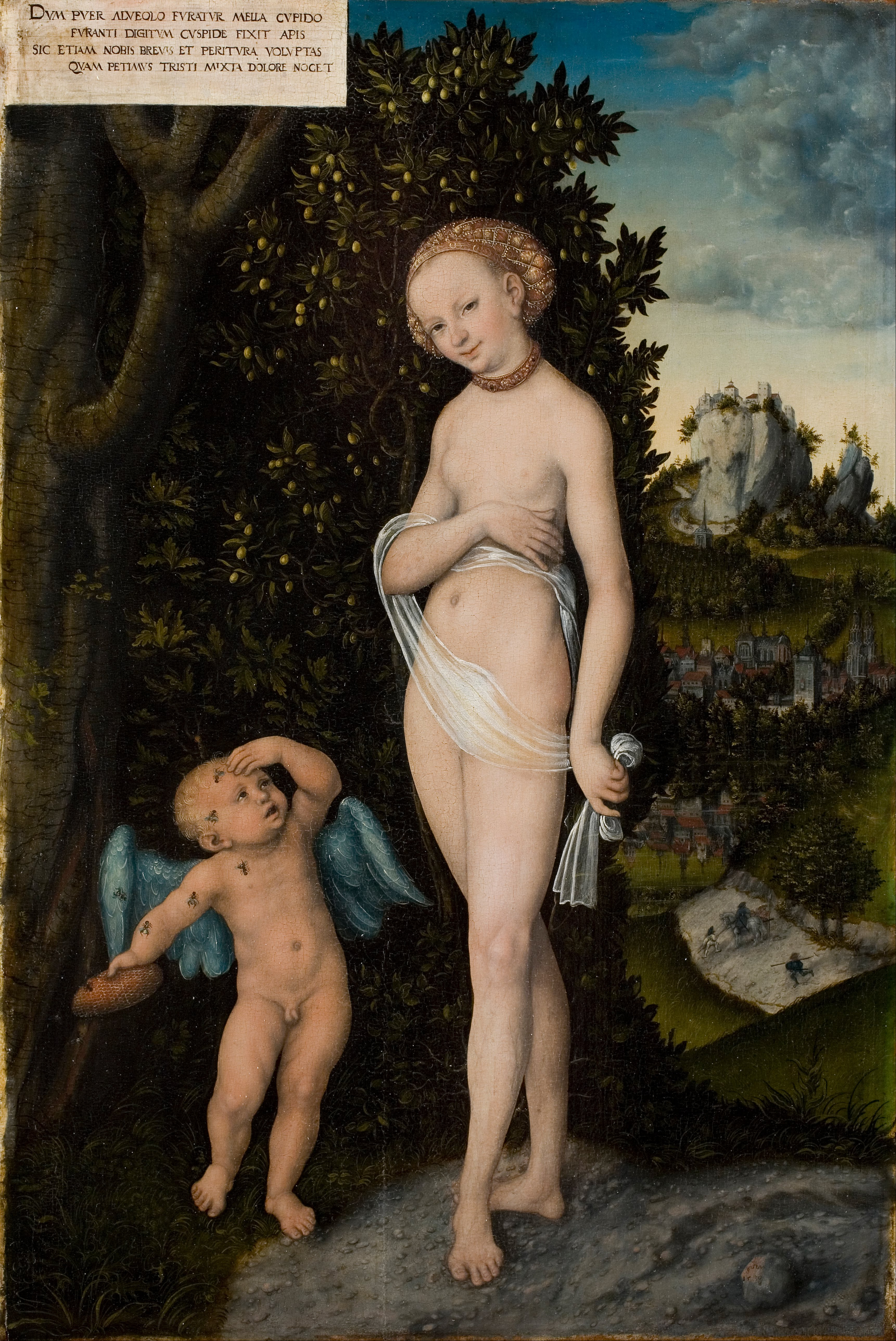
Venus and Amor, 1530

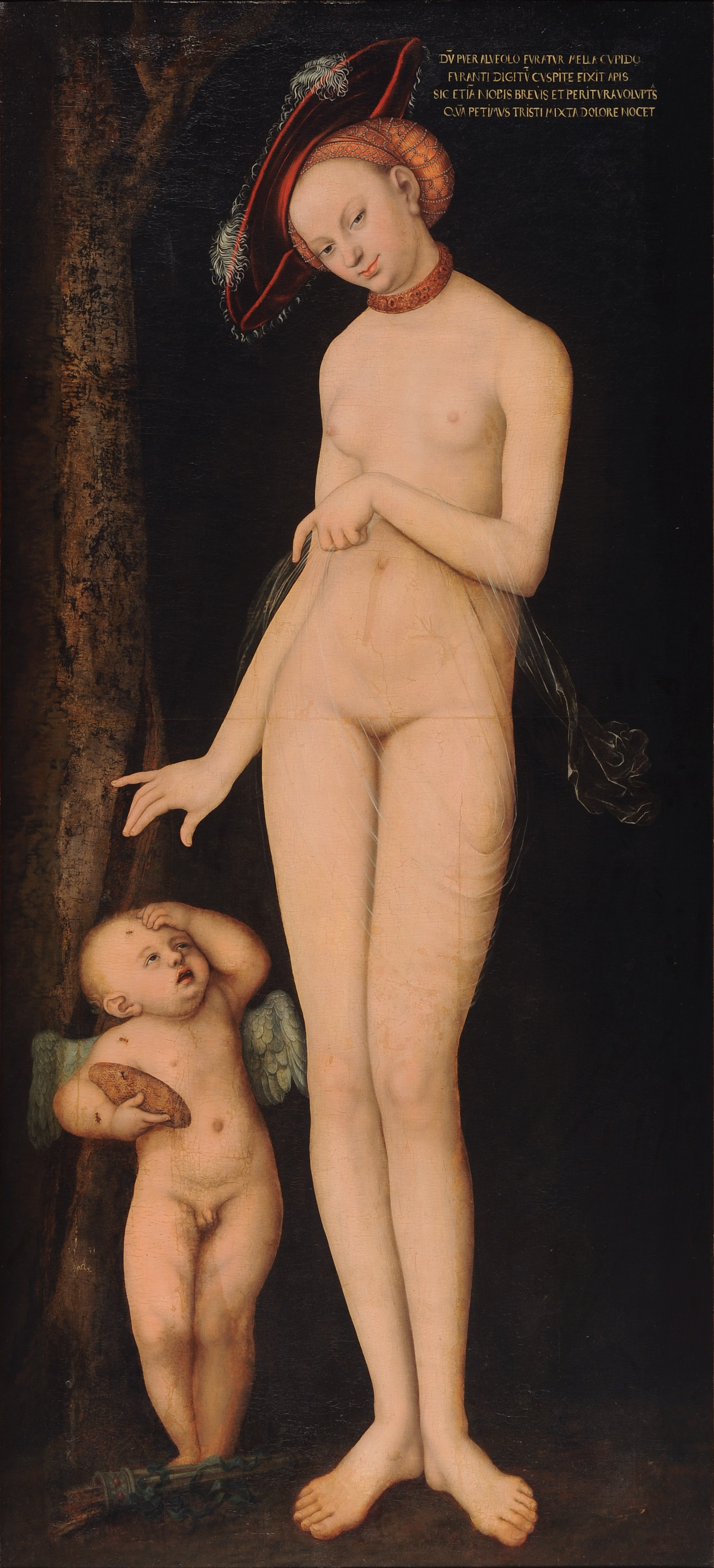
Venus with Cupid Stealing Honey, 1531

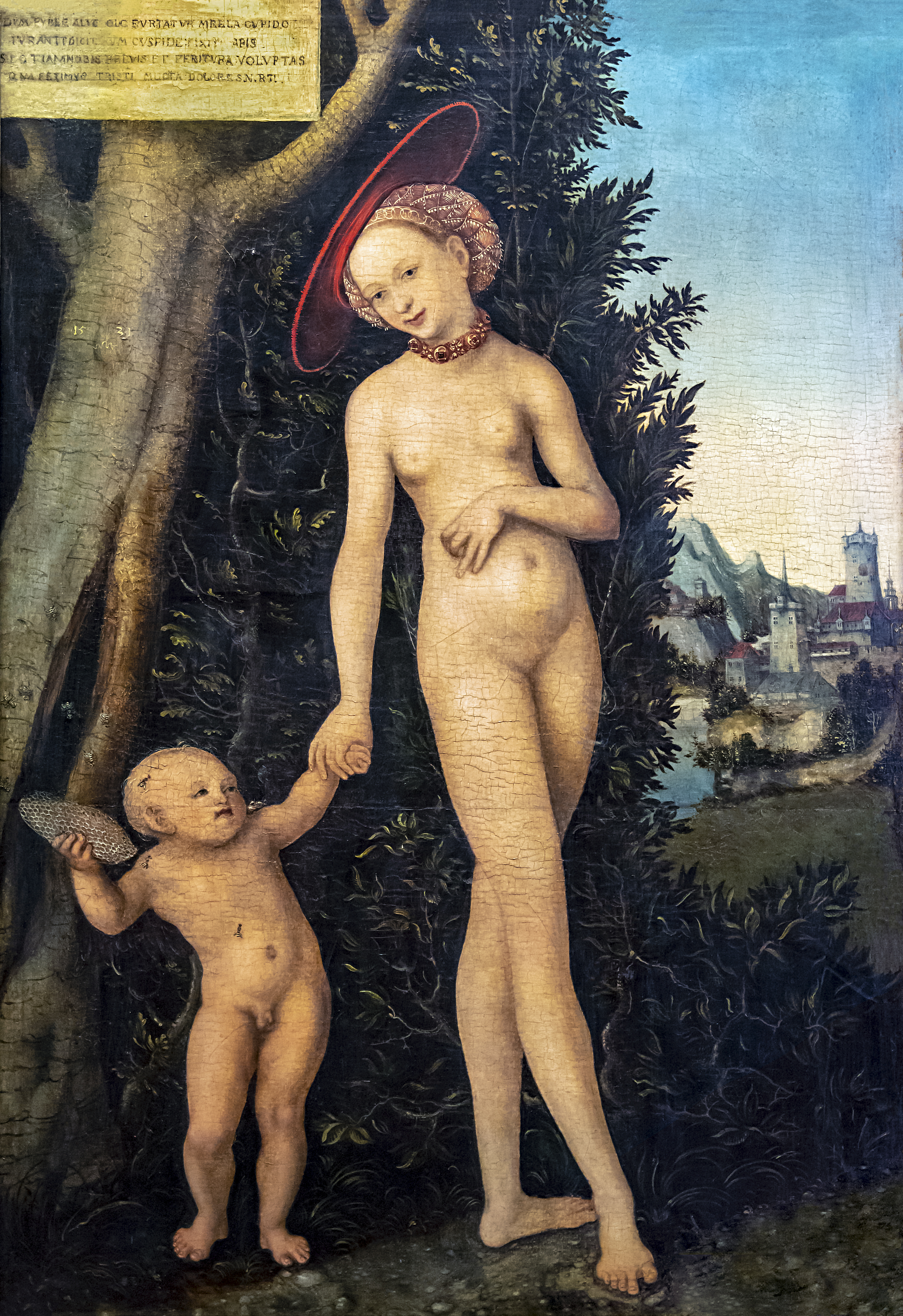
Venus with Cupid, 1531

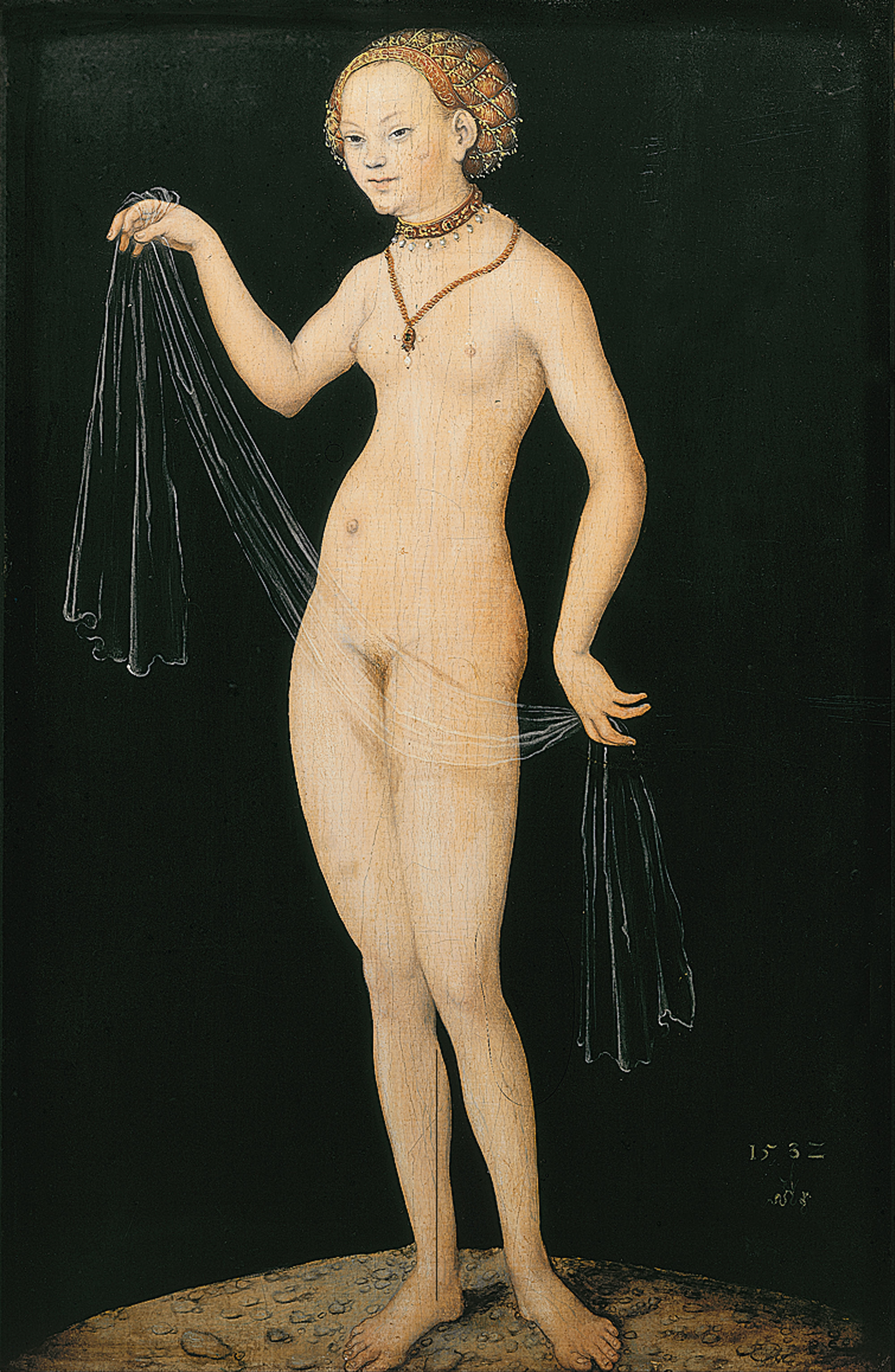
Venus, 1532

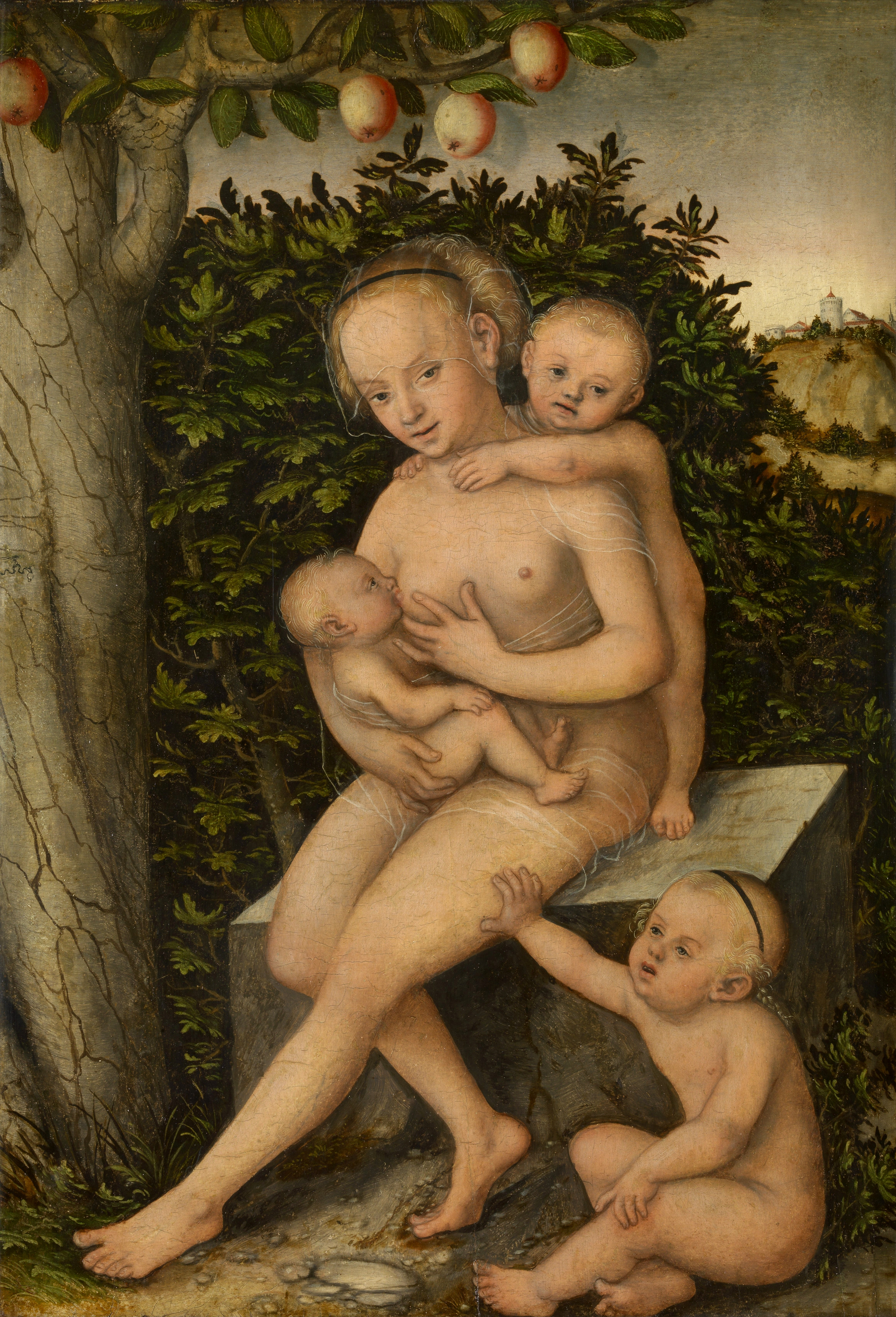
Caritas (Lucas Cranach the Elder), c. 1537

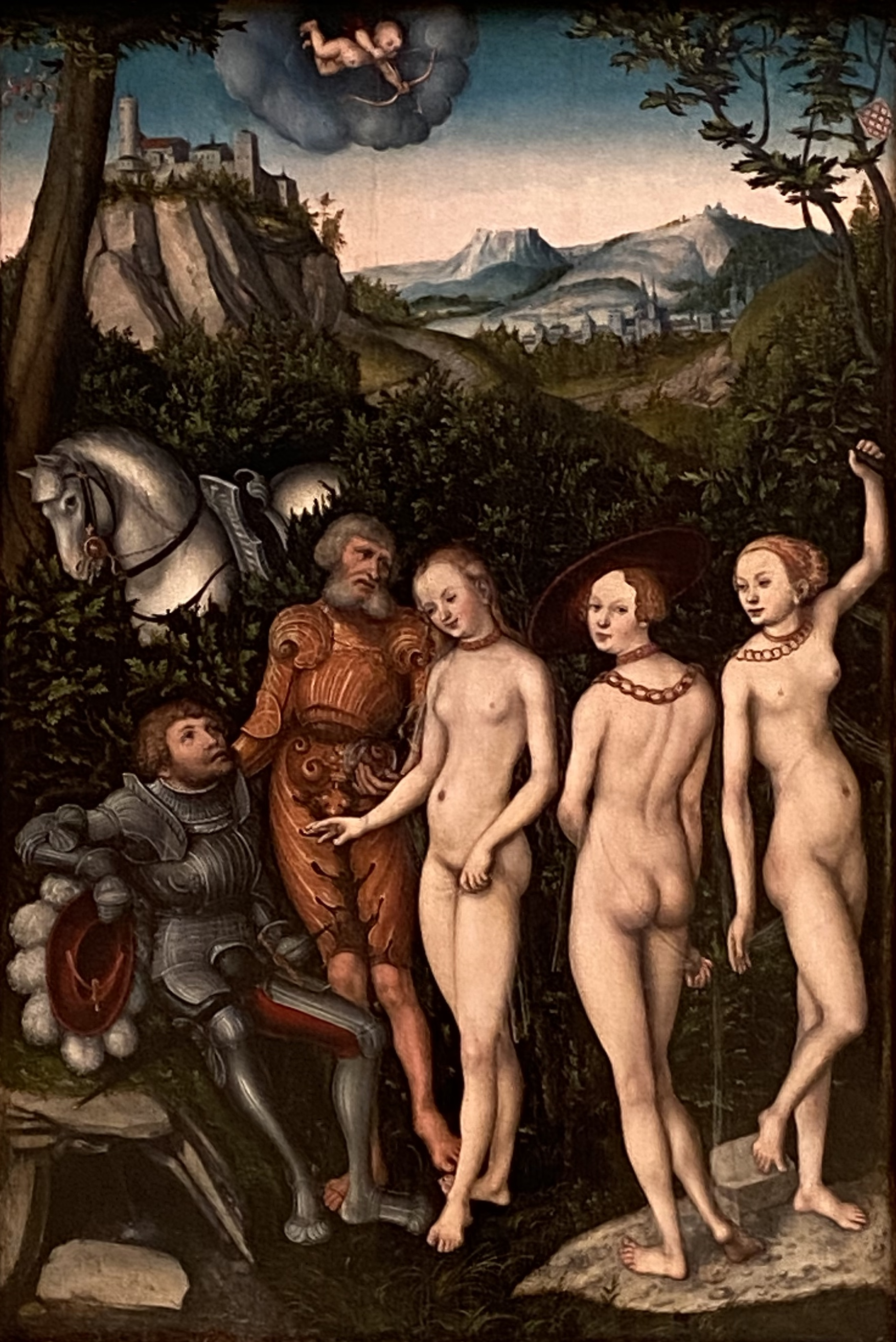
Judgement of Paris (1528)

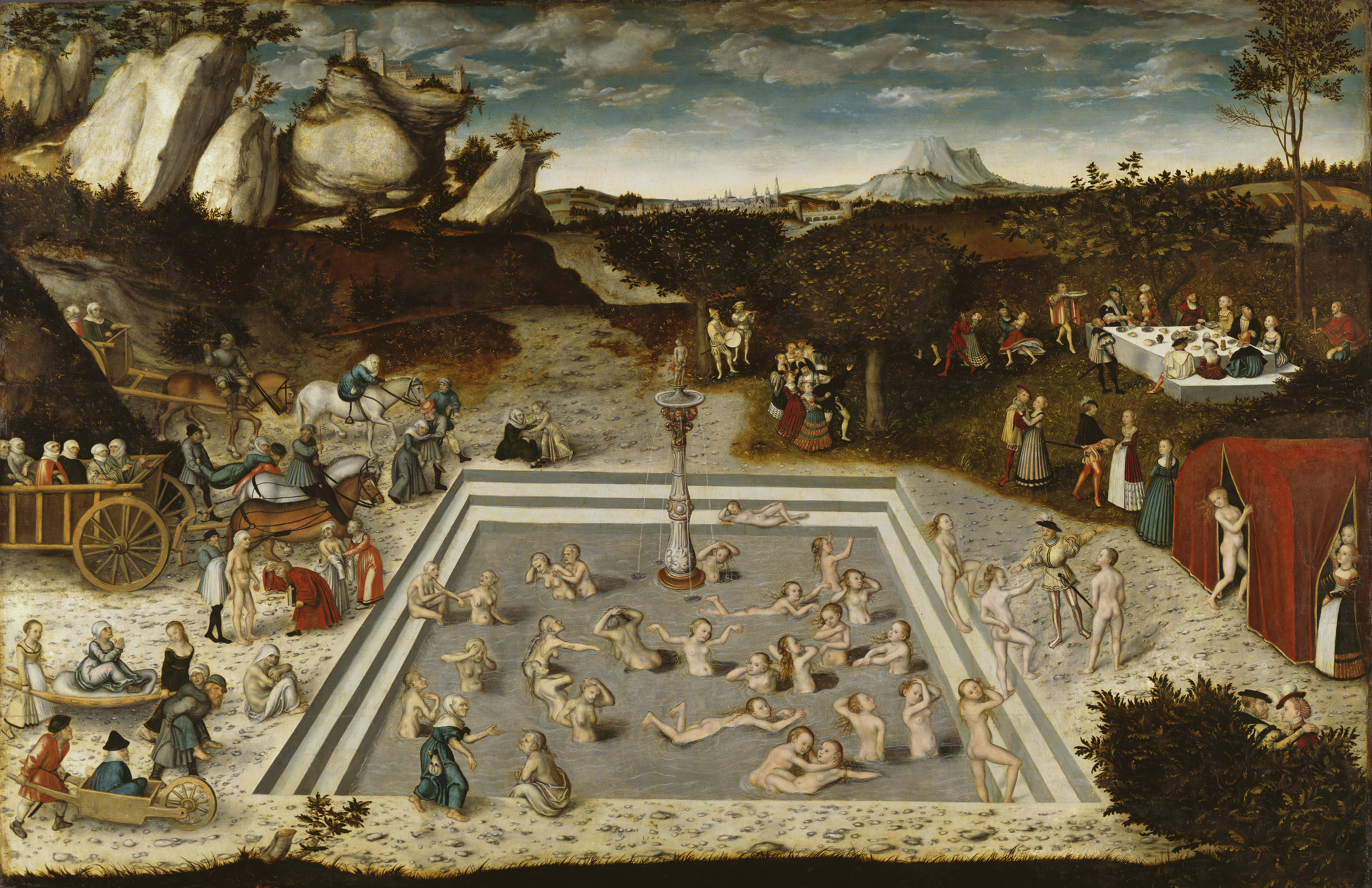
The Fountain of Youth (Der Jungbrunnen), 1546

These subjects were produced early in his career, when they show Italian influences including that of Jacopo de' Barberi, who was at the court of Saxony for a period up to 1505. They then become rare until after the death of Frederick the Wise. The later nudes are in a distinctive style which abandons Italian influence for a revival of Late Gothic style, with small heads, narrow shoulders, high breasts and waists. The poses become more frankly seductive and even exhibitionist.

Humour and pathos are combined at times in pictures such as Jealousy (Augsburg, 1527; Vienna, 1530), where women and children are huddled into groups as they watch the strife of men wildly fighting around them. A lost canvas of 1545 is said to show hares catching and roasting hunters. In 1546, possibly under Italian influence, Cranach composed the Fons Juventutis (The Fountain of Youth), executed by his son, a picture in which older women are seen entering a Renaissance fountain, and exiting it transformed into youthful beauties.

== Paintings ==
=== Portraits ===
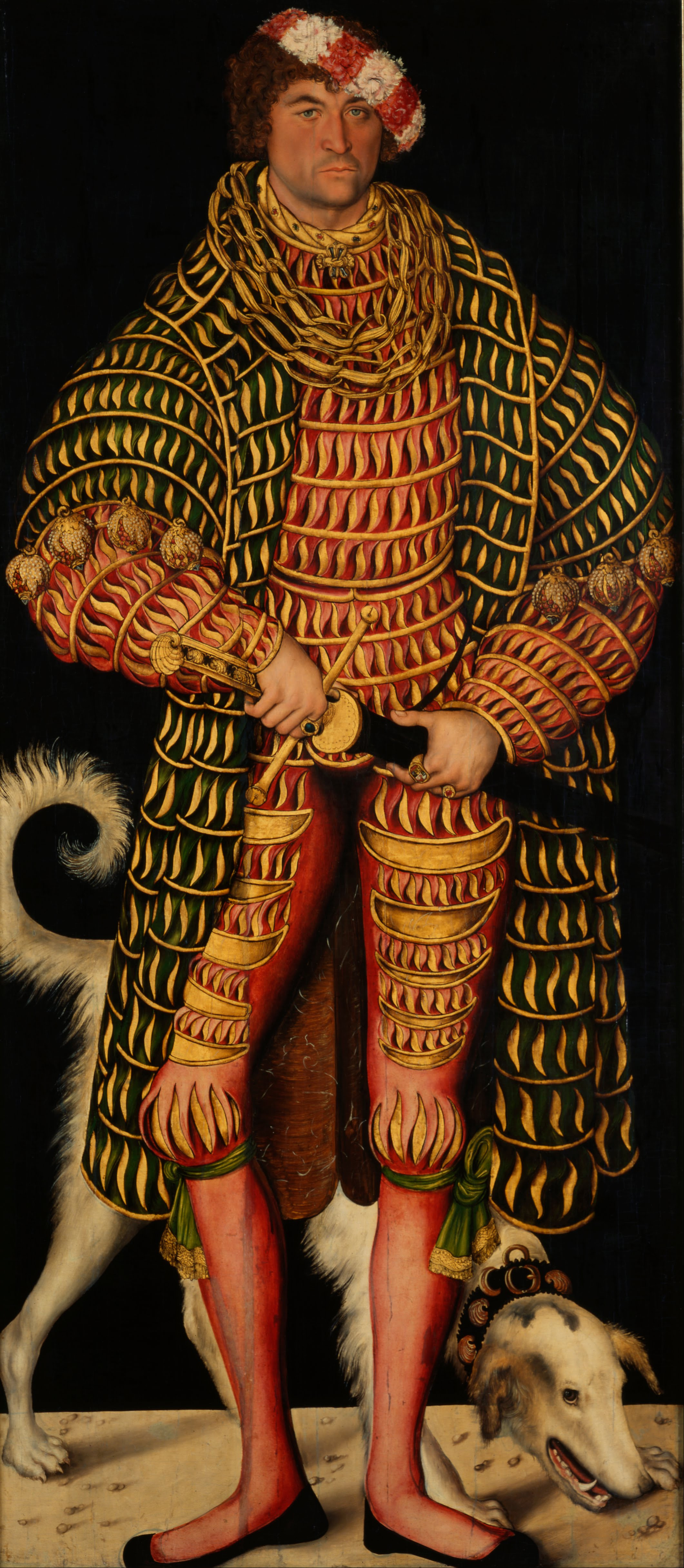
Duke Henry the Pious, 1514

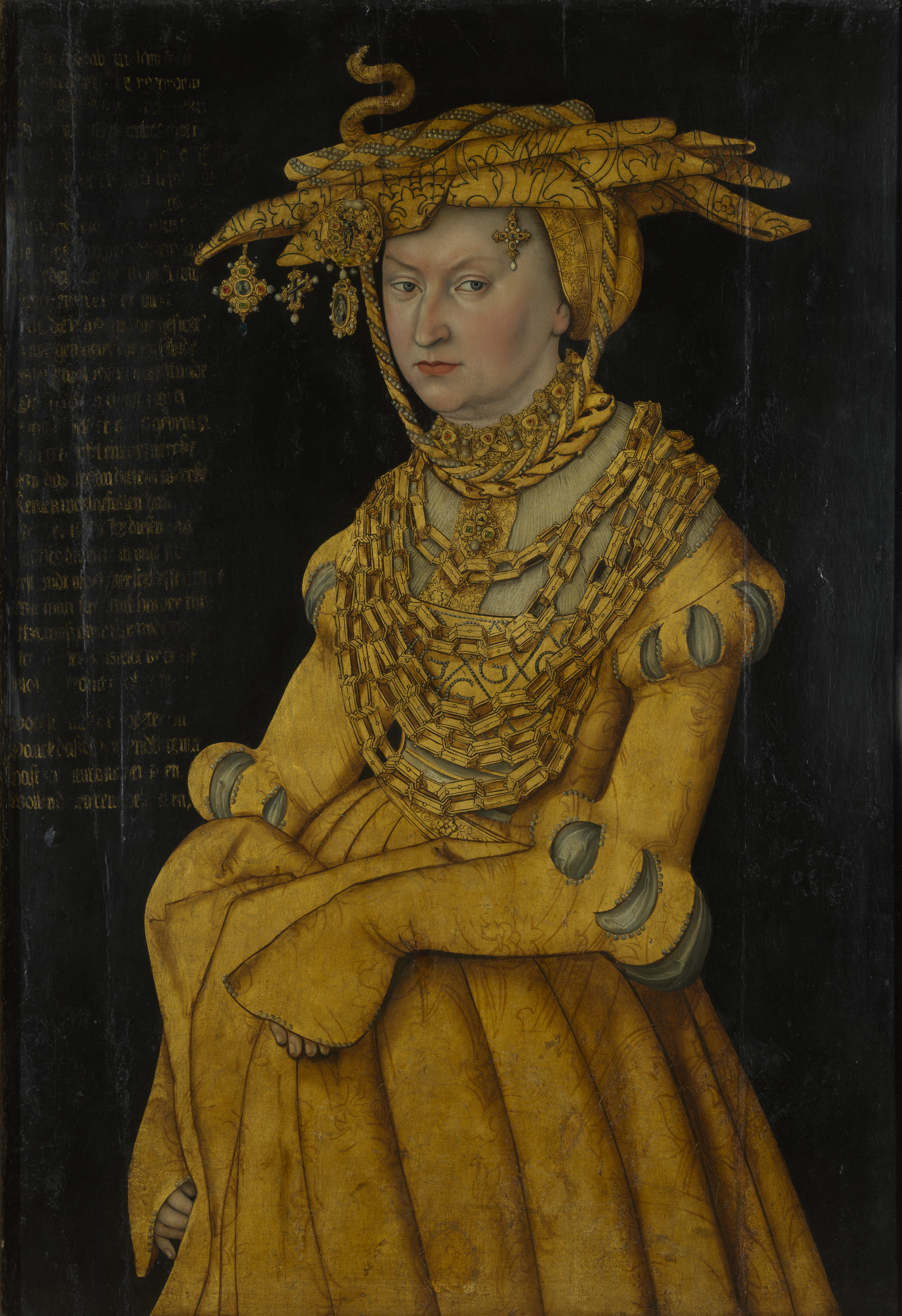
Catherine of Mecklenburg, 1514

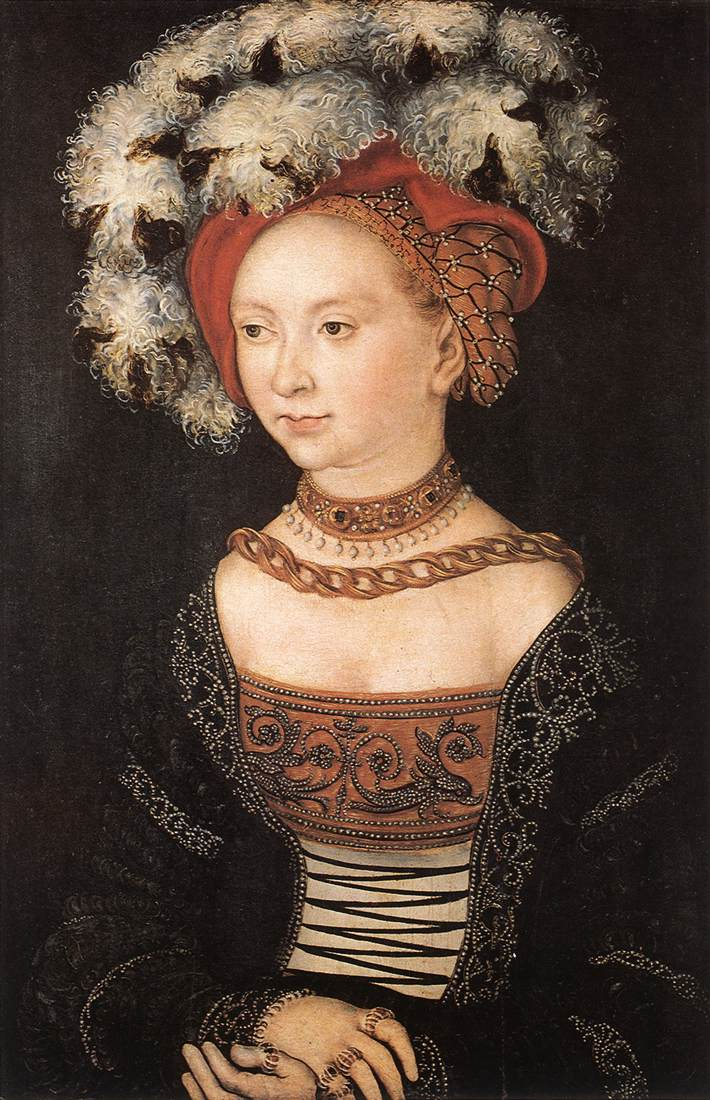
Sybille, 1530s

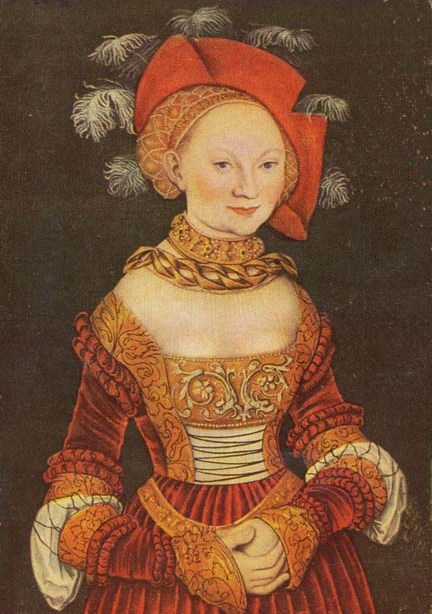
Emilie, c. 1535
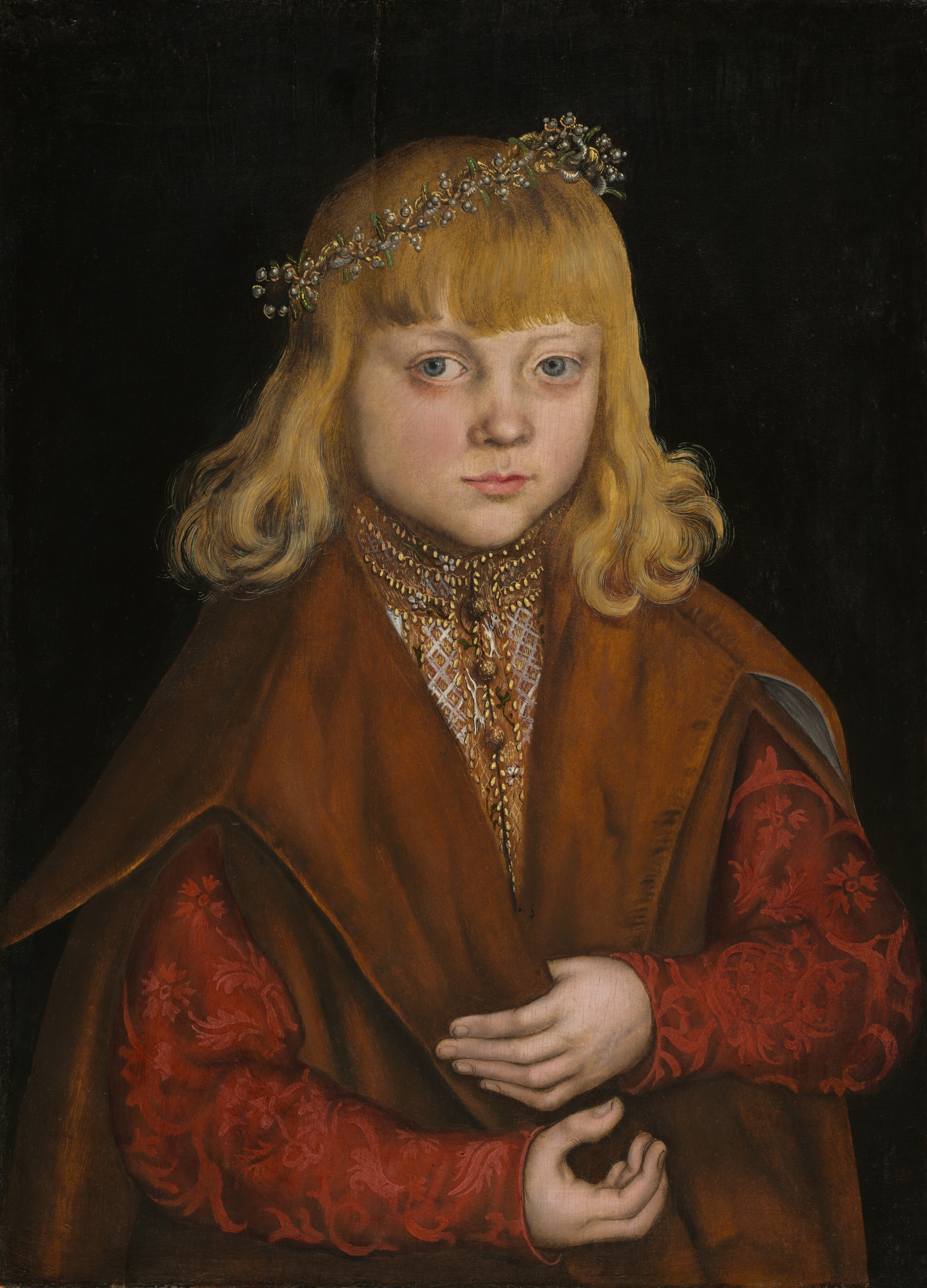
Portrait of a Saxon Prince (possibly Johann, husband of Elizabeth of Hesse), c. 1517

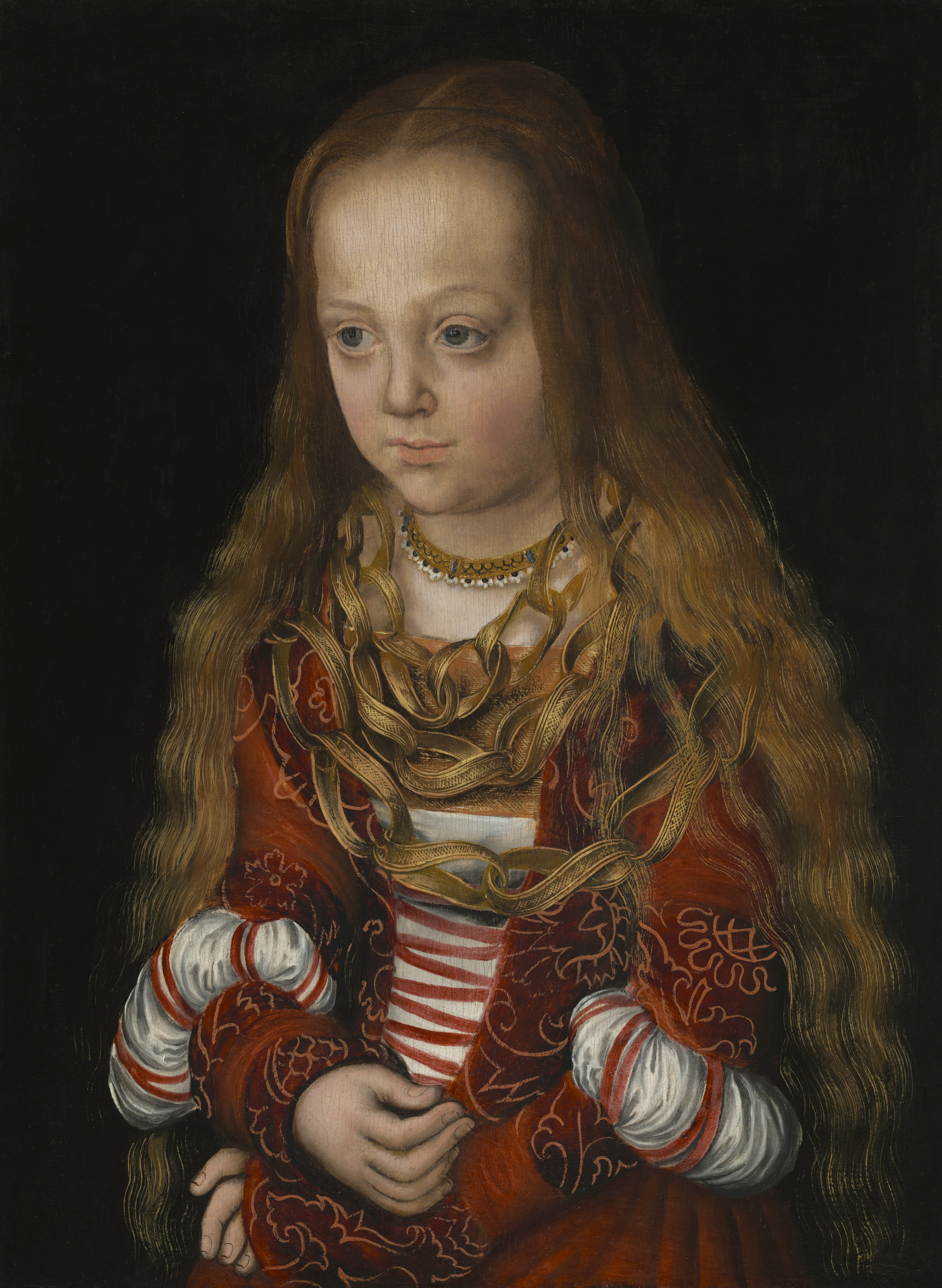
Portrait of a Saxon Princess (possibly George of Saxony's daughter-in-law Elizabeth of Hesse), c. 1517

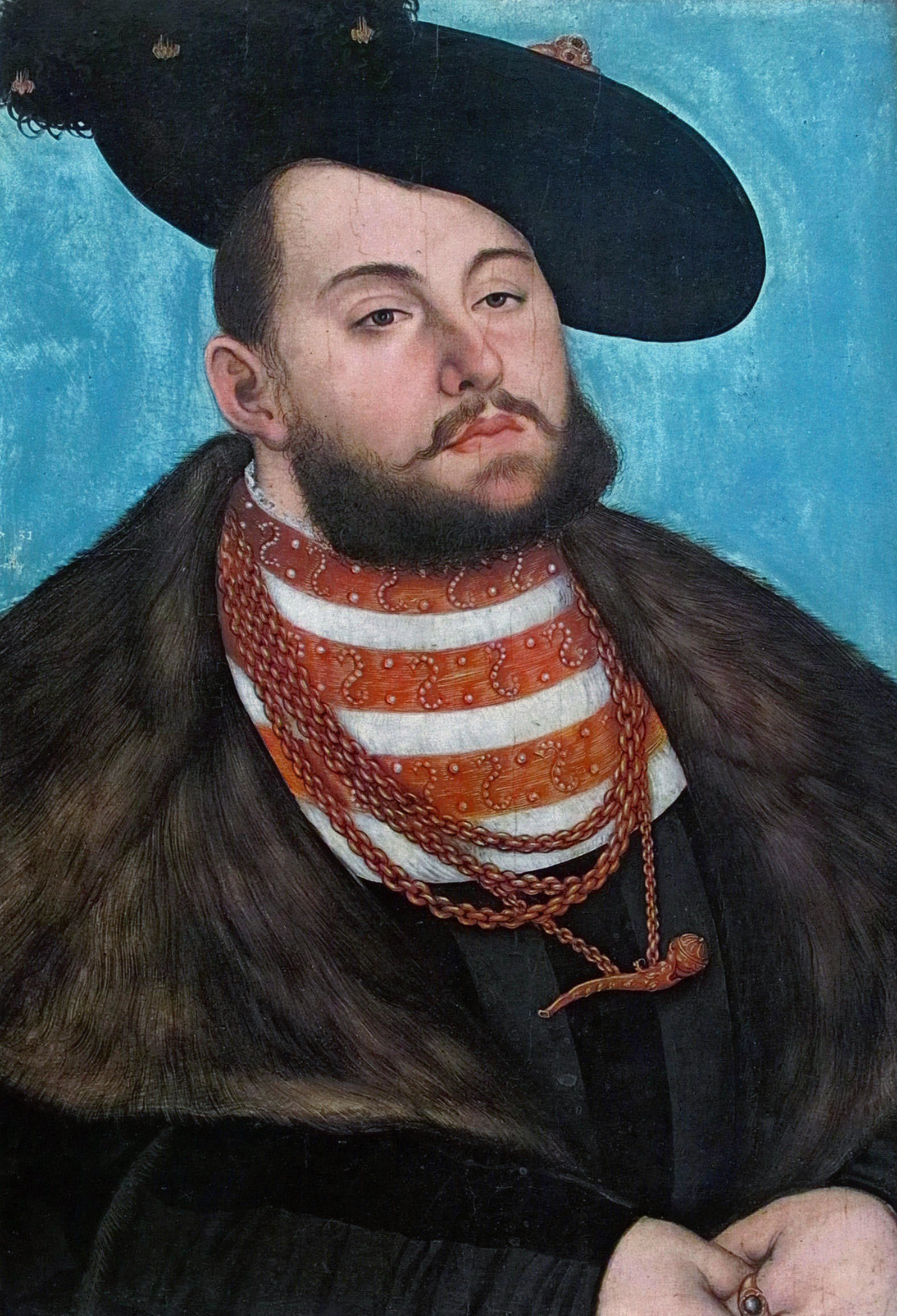
John Frederick I, 1531

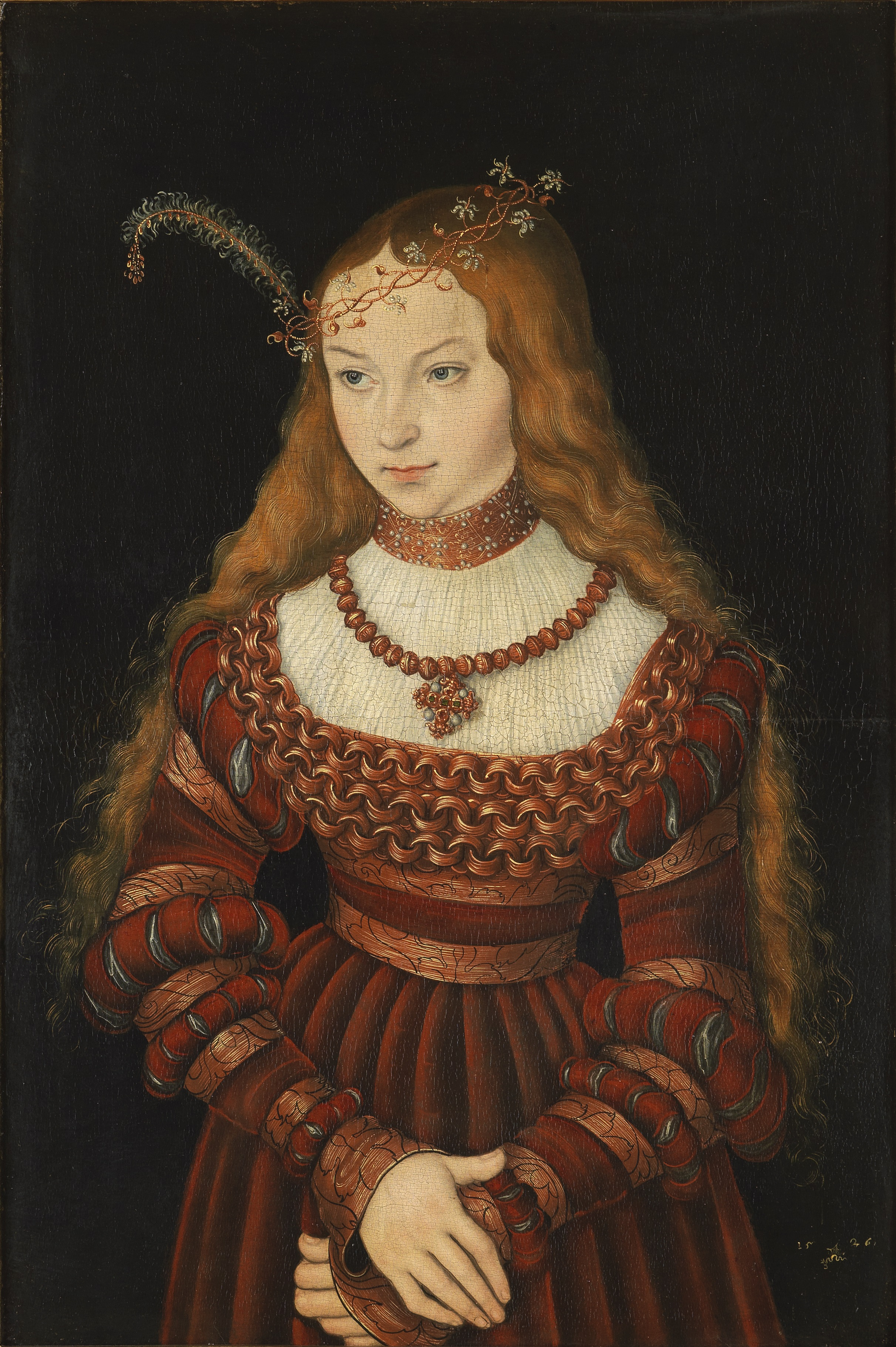
Sibylle of Cleves, wife of John Frederick I, 1526

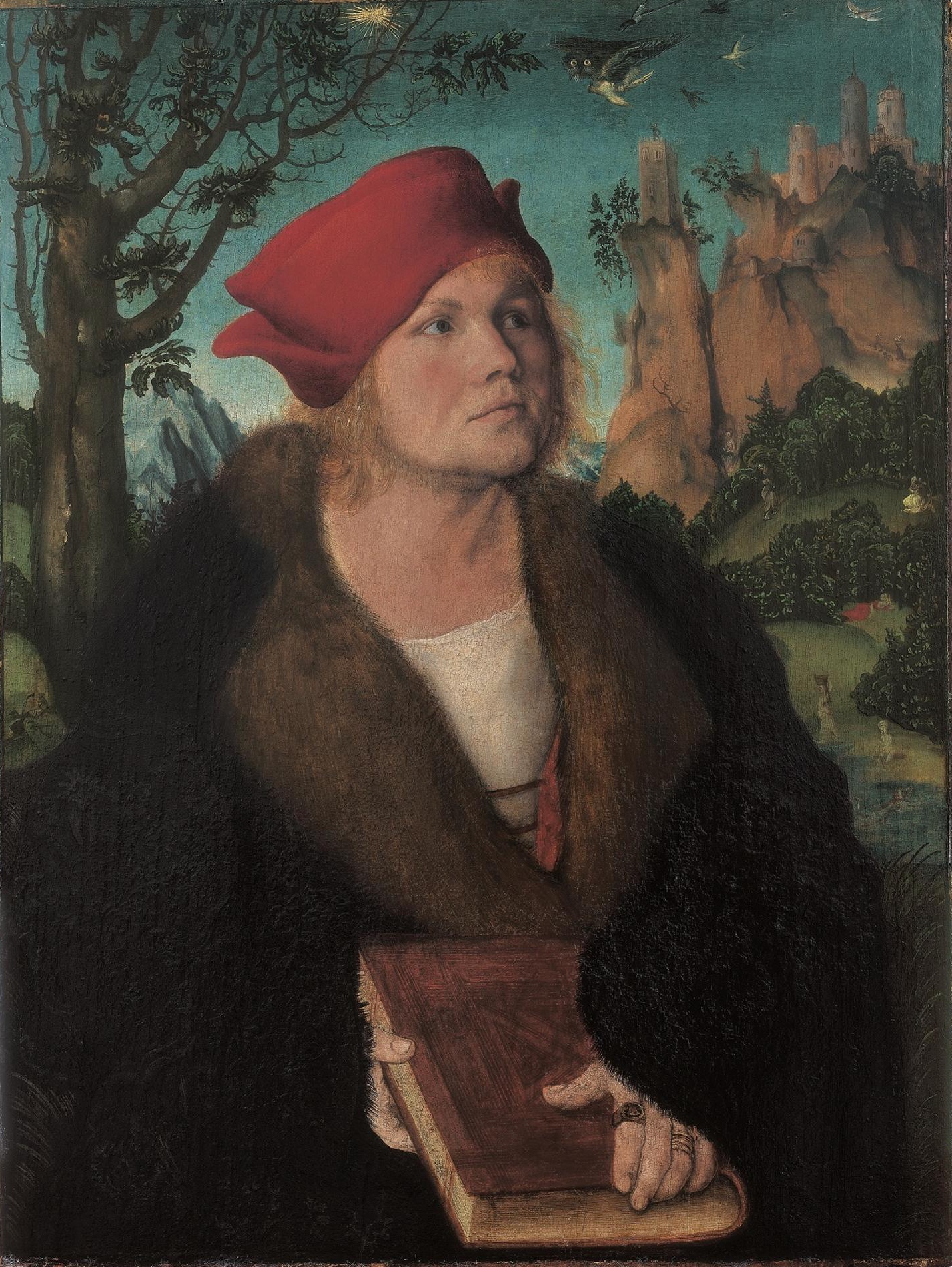
Johannes Cuspinian, 1502

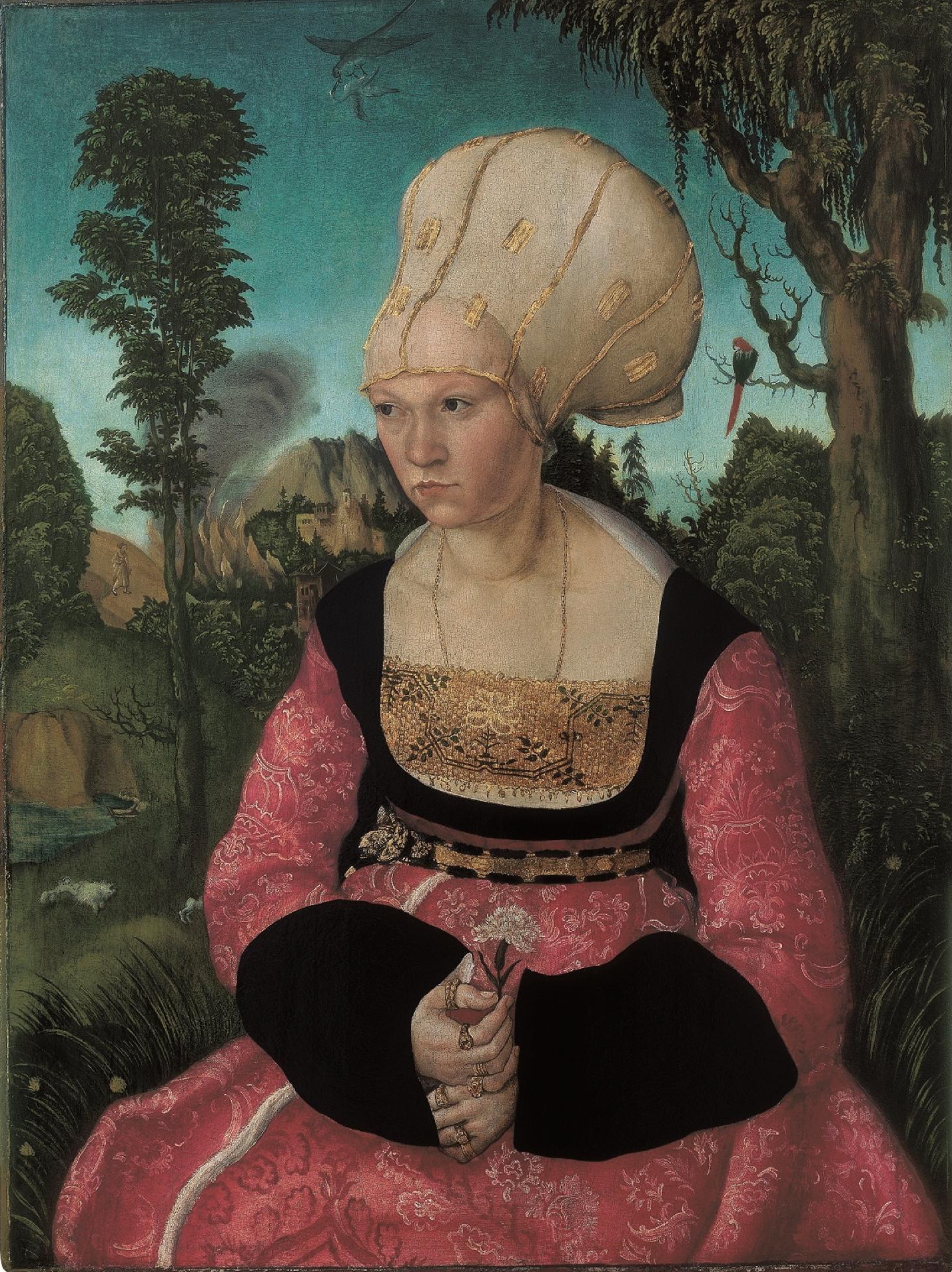
Johannes Cuspinian's wife, 1502

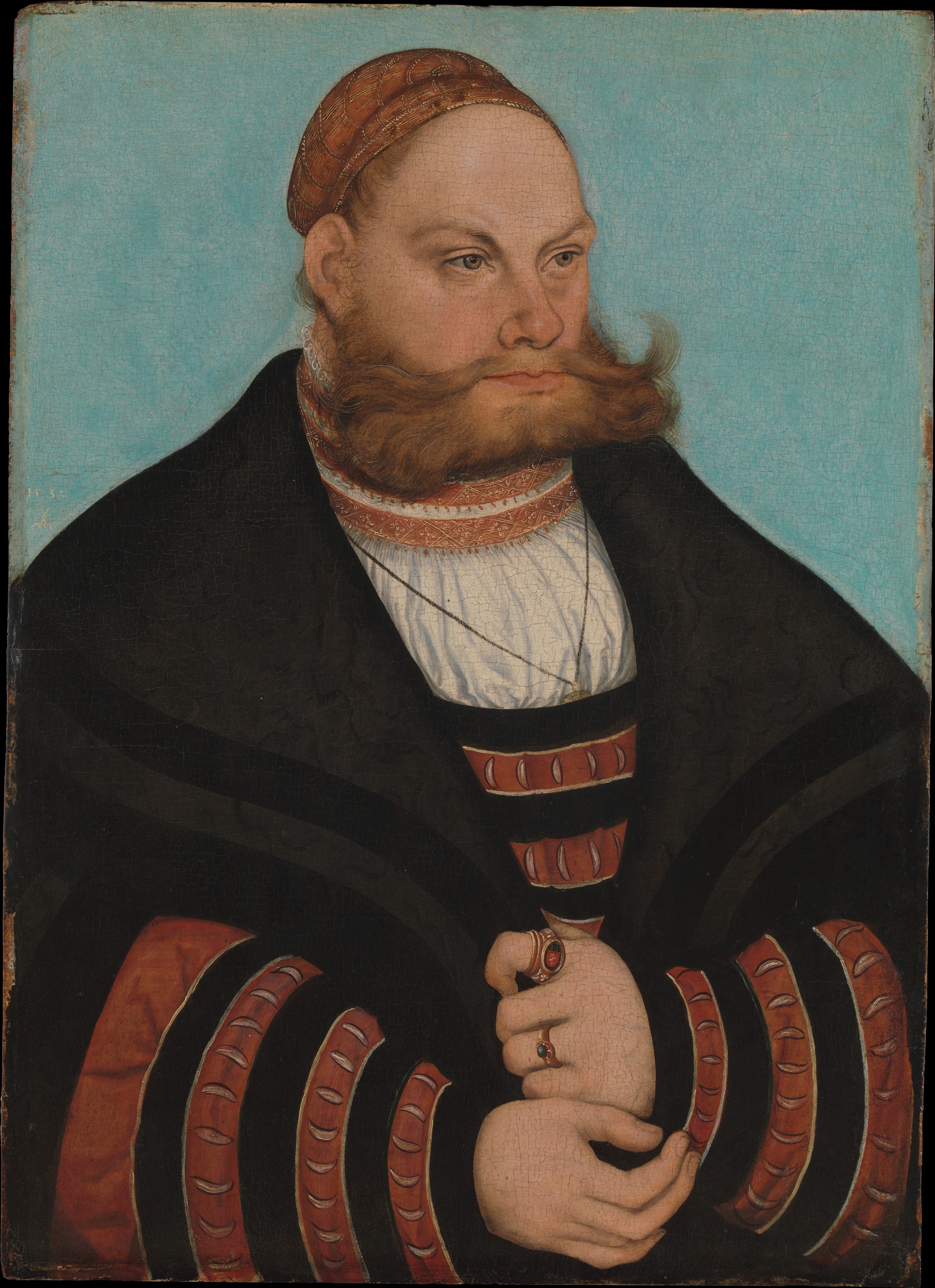
Lukas Spielhausen, 1532, Metropolitan Museum of Art

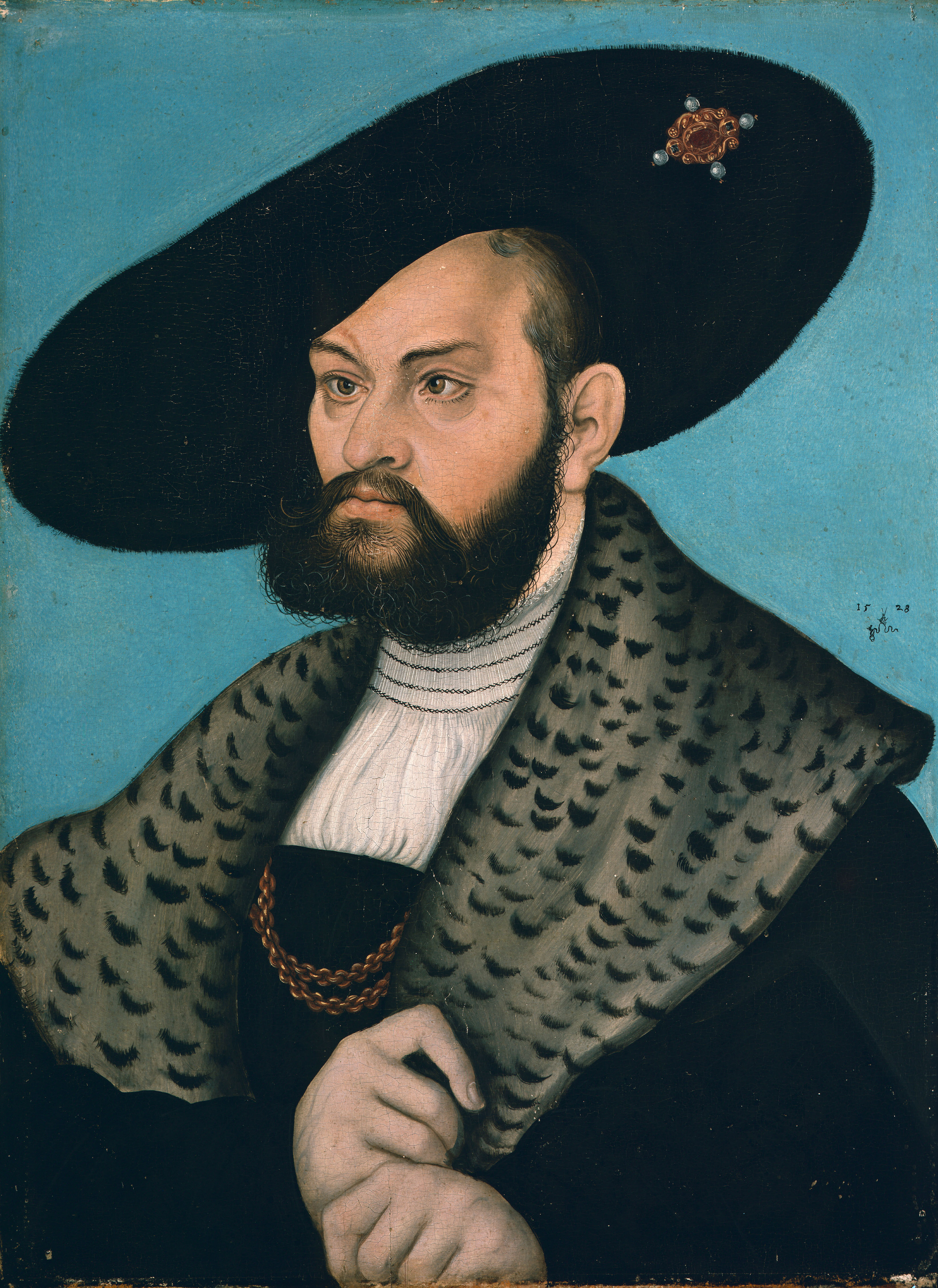
Albert of Prussia, 1528, Herzog Anton Ulrich Museum

=== Religion, mythology, allegory ===
Torgauer Altar, 1509, Städel Museum, Frankfurt

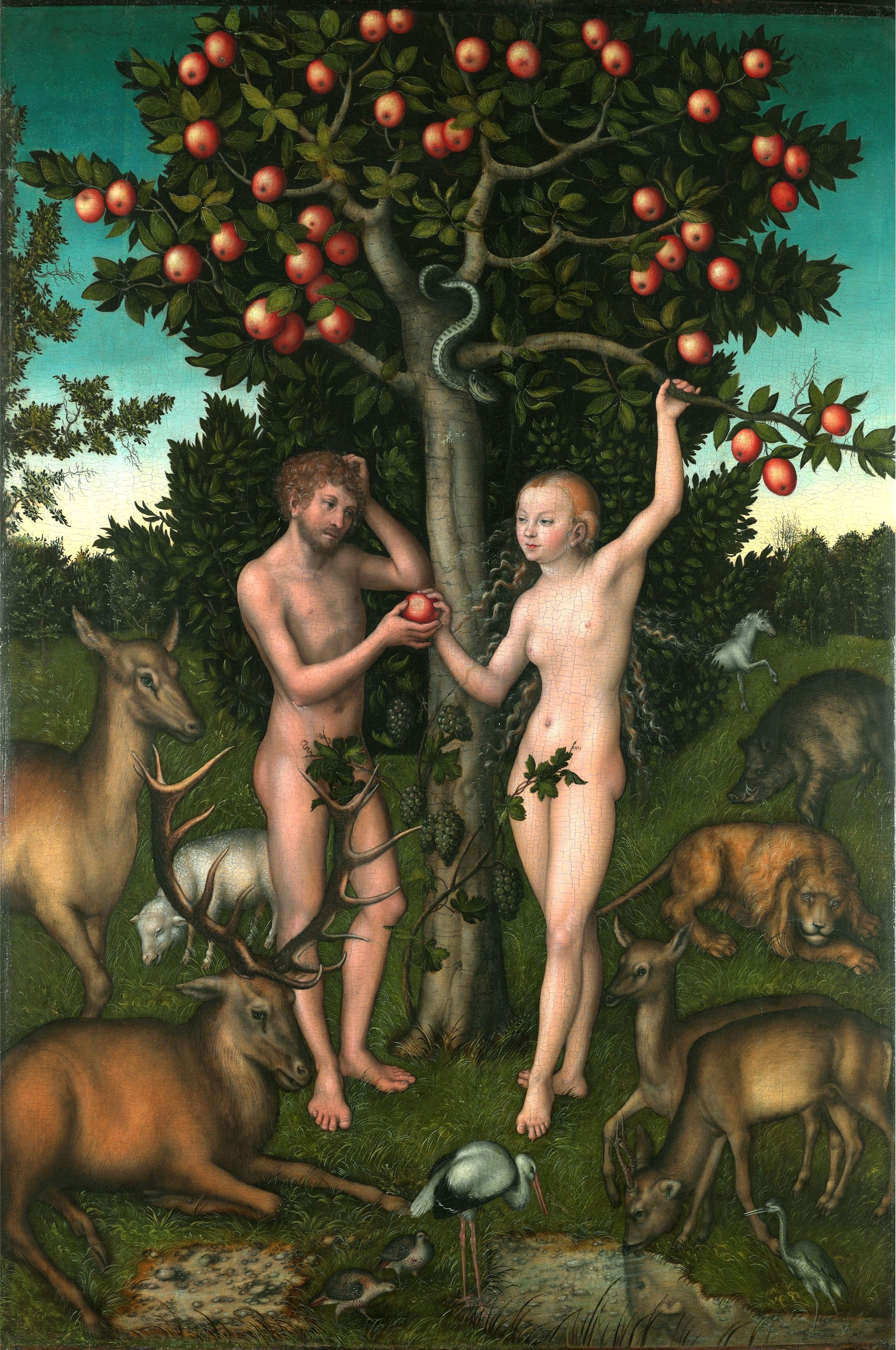
Adam and Eve (Courtauld Institute of Art)

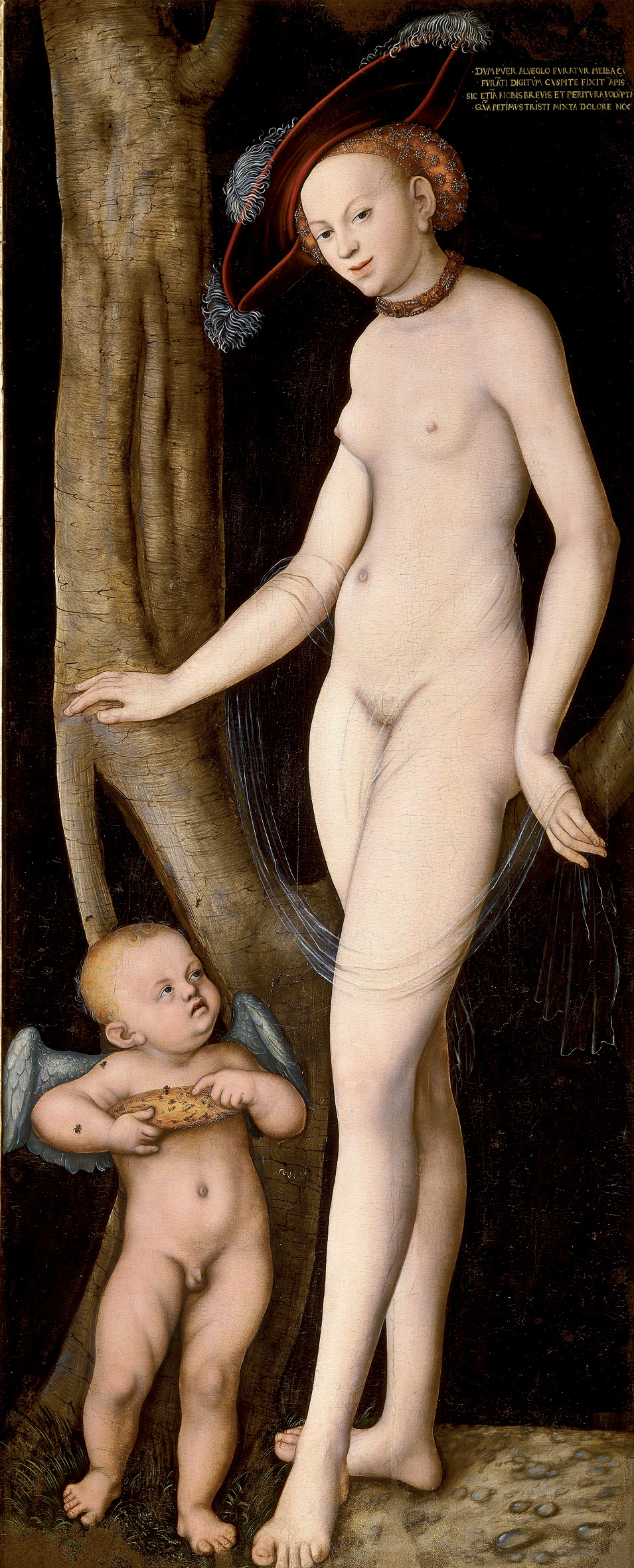
Venus and Cupid with a Honeycomb, c. 1527

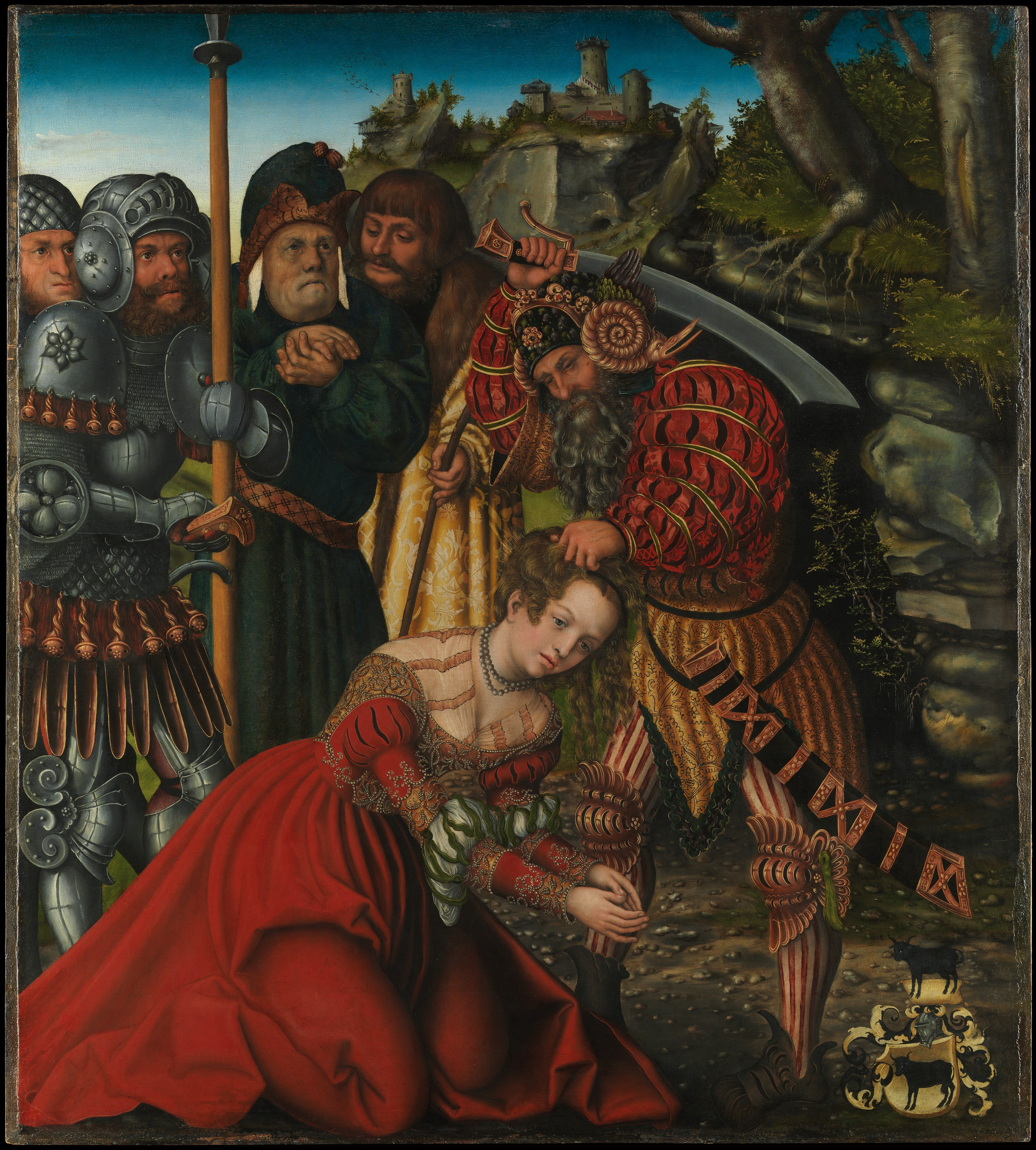
The Martyrdom of Saint Barbara, 1510, Metropolitan Museum of Art

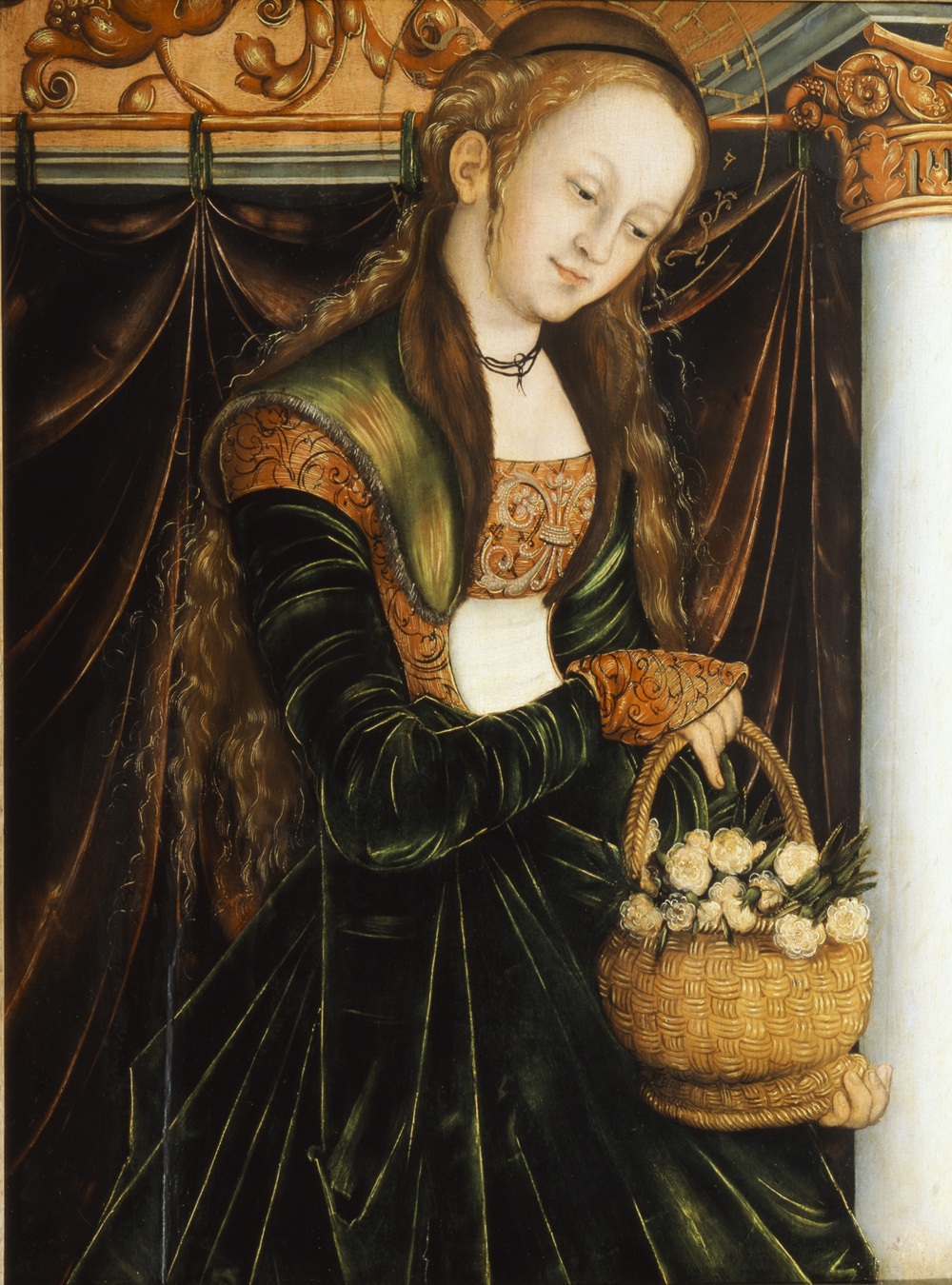
Dorothea, c. 1530

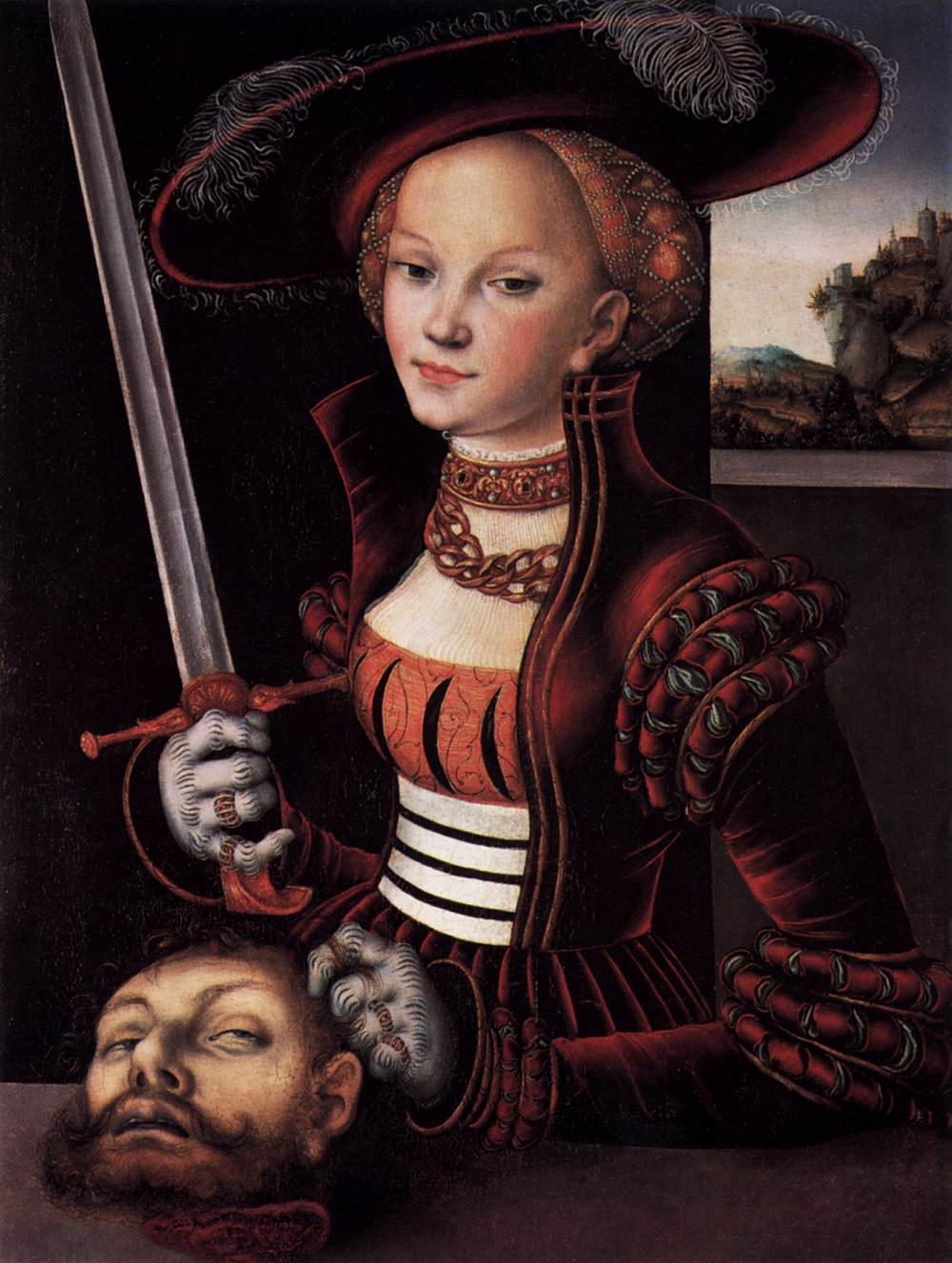
Judith with the head of Holofernes, 1530

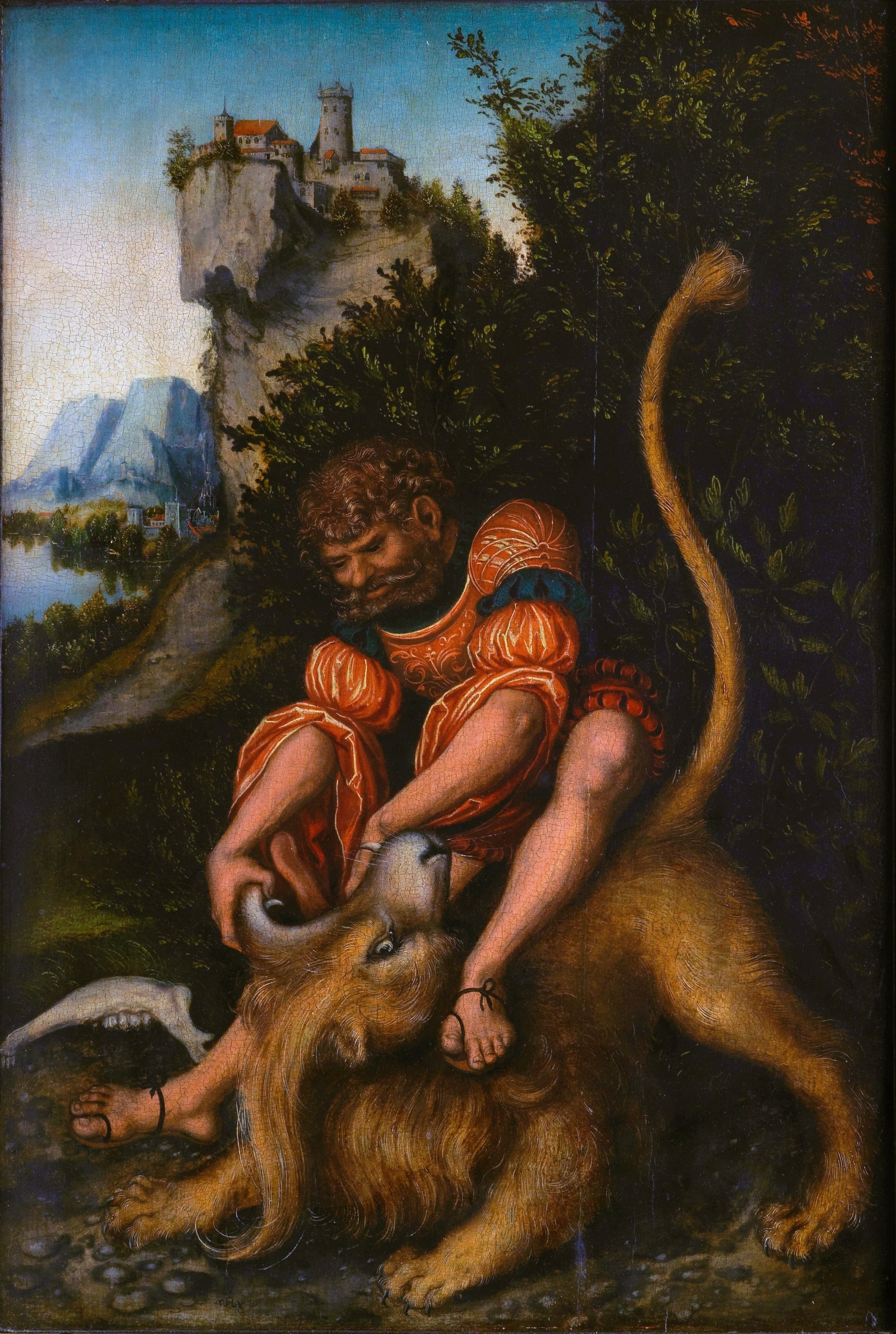
Samson's Fight with the Lion, 1525

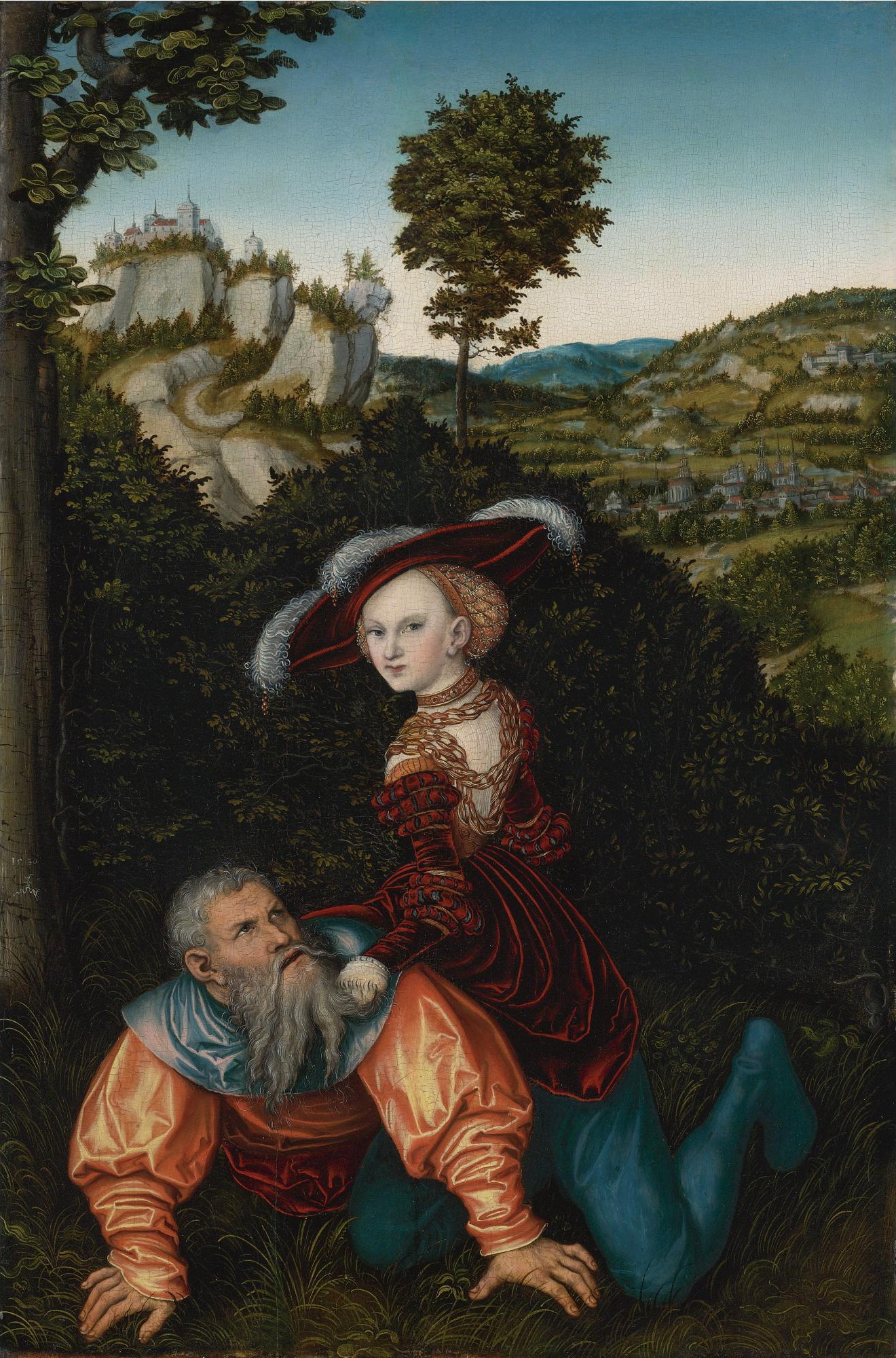
Phyllis and Aristotle, 1530

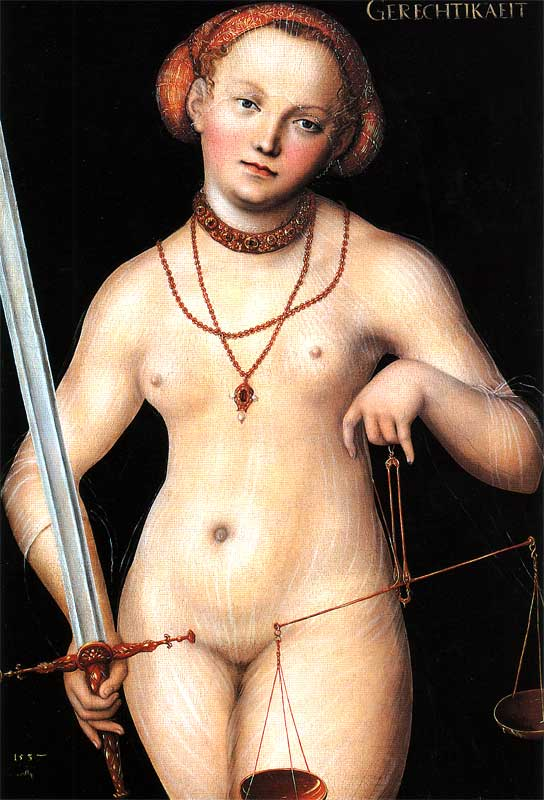
Justice, 1537

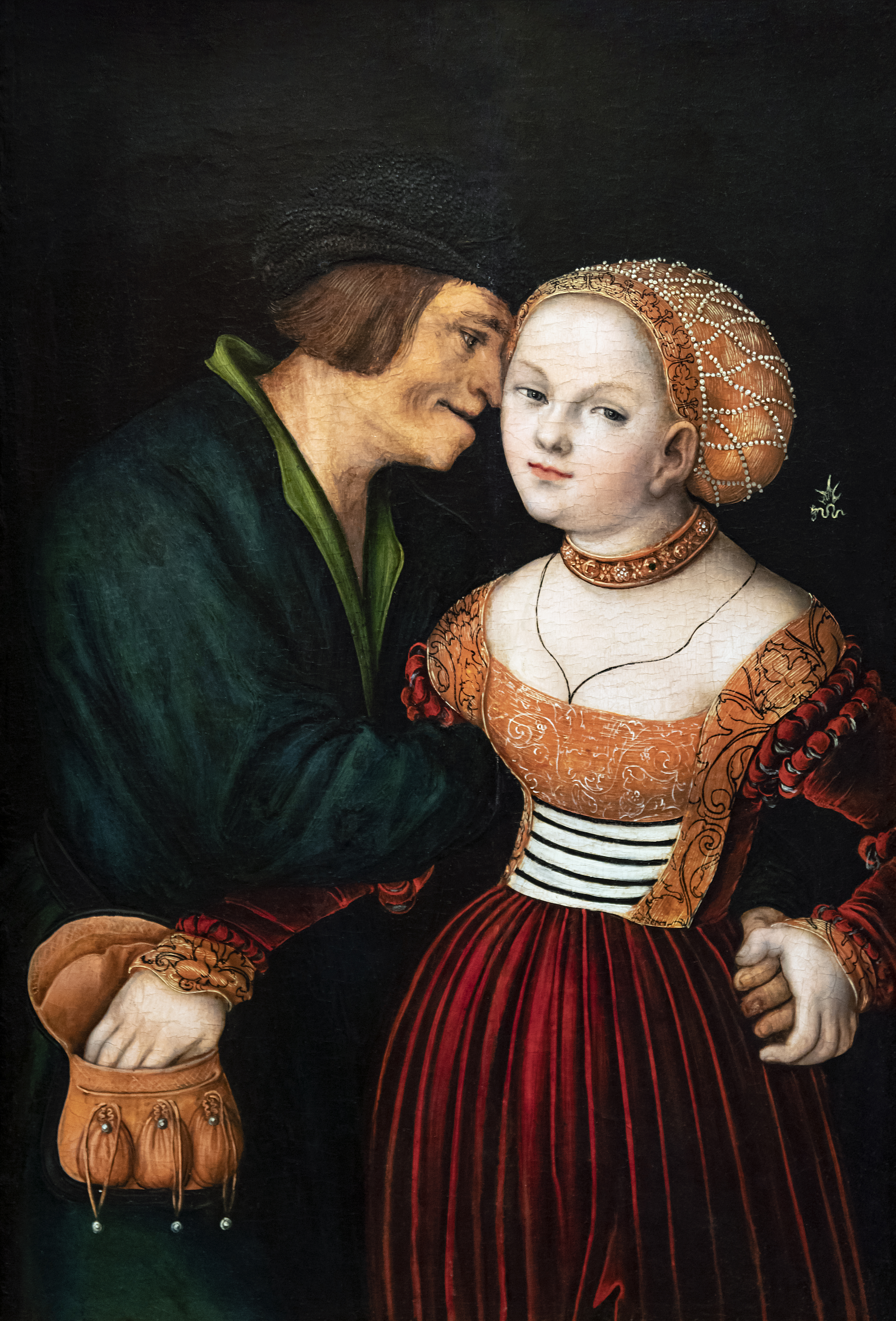
Lovers, Bemberg Foundation, Toulouse

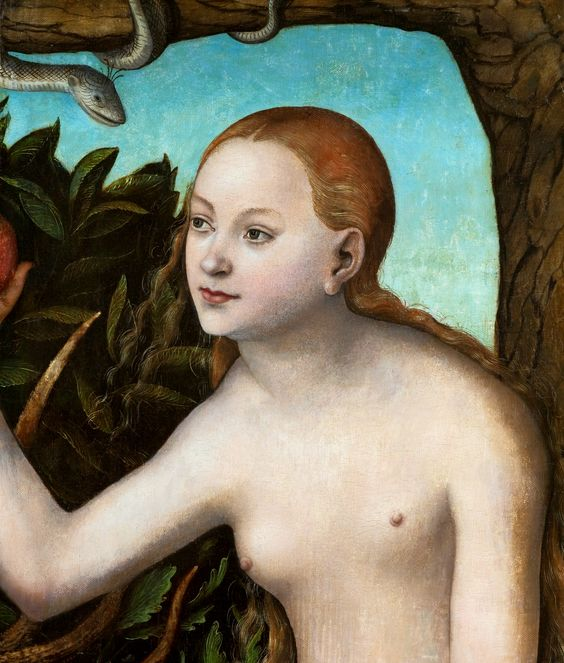
Eve, National Museum, Wrocław

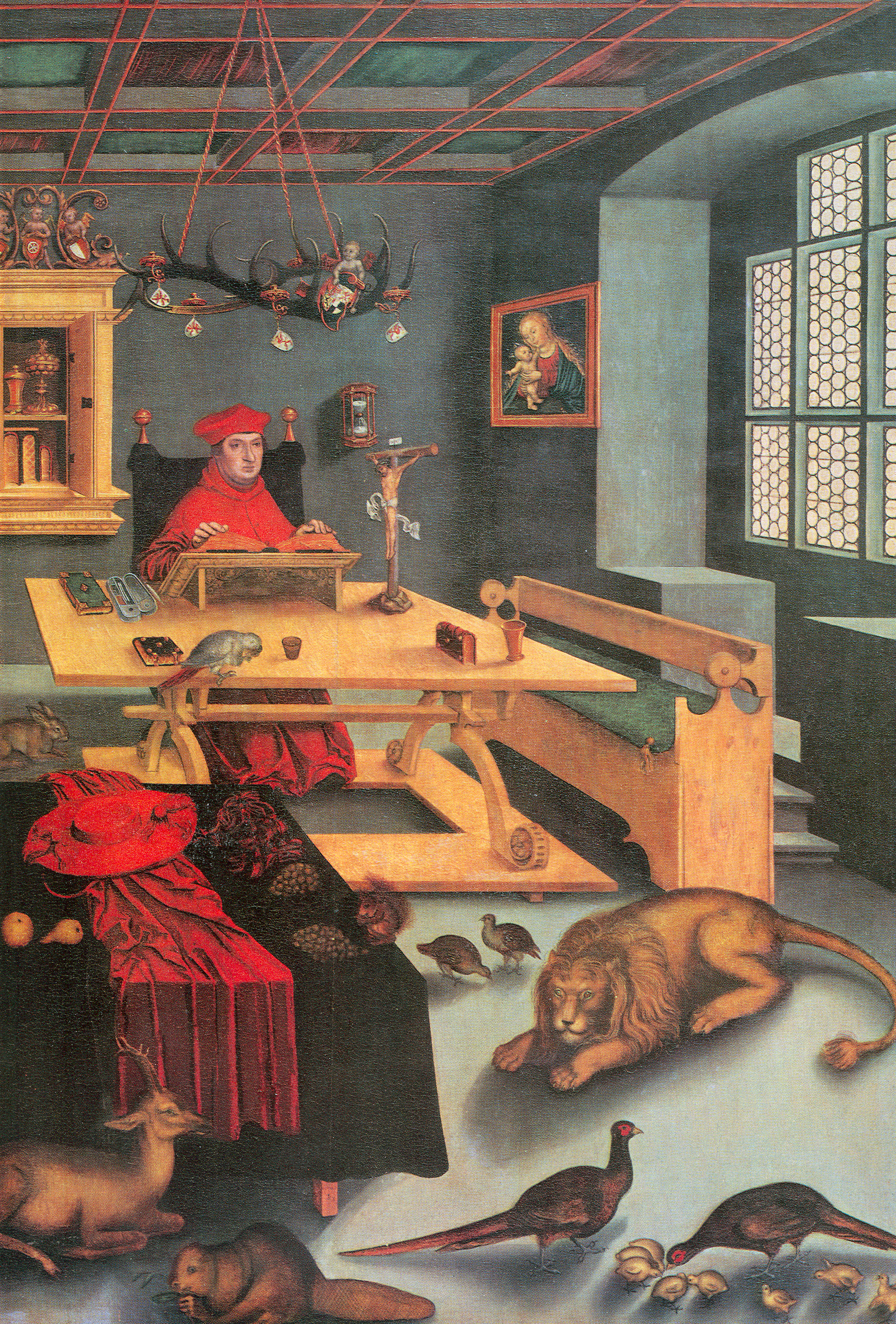
Saint Jerome in His Study, 1526

== Looted Cranachs ==
The Nazis had a particular affection for Cranach's work and looted many paintings during the Third Reich. This has led to claims for restitution, notably from Jewish collectors who were persecuted or looted by the Nazis. The Nazis looted Cranach's Portrait of John Frederick I, Elector of Saxony (around 1530s) from Jewish art collector Fritz Gutmann before murdering him but the painting was recovered by Gutmann's grandson Simon Goodman eighty years later after decades of searching.

Cranach's "Cupid Complaining to Venus" passed through in Hitler's personal collection, causing the National Gallery to research its history, suspecting that it may have been looted. The diptych Adam and Eve by Lucas Cranach the Elder has been the focus of a legal dispute between the heirs of the former owner, Dutch art collector Jacques Goudstikker, and the Norton Simon museum in California. In 1999, the Commission for Art Recovery of the World Jewish Congress notified the North Carolina Museum of Art that its prized Cranach Madonna and Child had been looted by Nazis from the Jewish Viennese art collector Philipp von Gomperz.

On 20 October 2000 a Budapest court ruled that a Cranach and other paintings claimed by the granddaughter of famous Hungarian Jewish art collector Baron Herzog that were looted by Nazis with the Hungarian financial police should be returned to her. In 2012 the heirs of Rosa and Jakob Oppenheimer submitted a claim to the National Gallery of Ireland for a Cranach painting of Saint Christopher. The museum hired a private provenance researcher, Laurie Stein, to investigate the circumstance of the sale in 1934, and she concluded that the Cranach had not been sold under duress by the Jewish owners.

In April 2021 Cranach's "The Resurrection" was sold at auction following a settlement between the heirs of Holocaust victim Margarete Eisenmann and the art dealer Eugene Thaw. After being looted, the Cranach had been consigned to Sothebys by Hans Lange and passed through Hugo Perls and Knoedler Galleries before being acquired by Eugene Thaw. Most of the lawsuits last many years and go through several appeals in different courts. A painting by a follower of Lucas Cranach the Elder titled Lamentation and completed in the 1530s, which had been looted from Poland in 1946, was returned to the National Museum, Wrocław in 2022.
