= Cranach =

Cranach is a German-language surname. Notable people with the surname include:

- Lucas Cranach the Elder (c. 1472–1553), German painter. Father of Hans and Lucas the Younger
  - Hans Cranach (c. 1513–1537), German painter
  - Lucas Cranach the Younger (c. 1515–1586), German painter. Father of Augustin
    - Augustin Cranach (1554–1595), German painter

== See also ==
- Granach
- Harry Graf Kessler (1868–1937), founder of the Cranach Press
