= Georg Cracow =

German lawyer and statesman

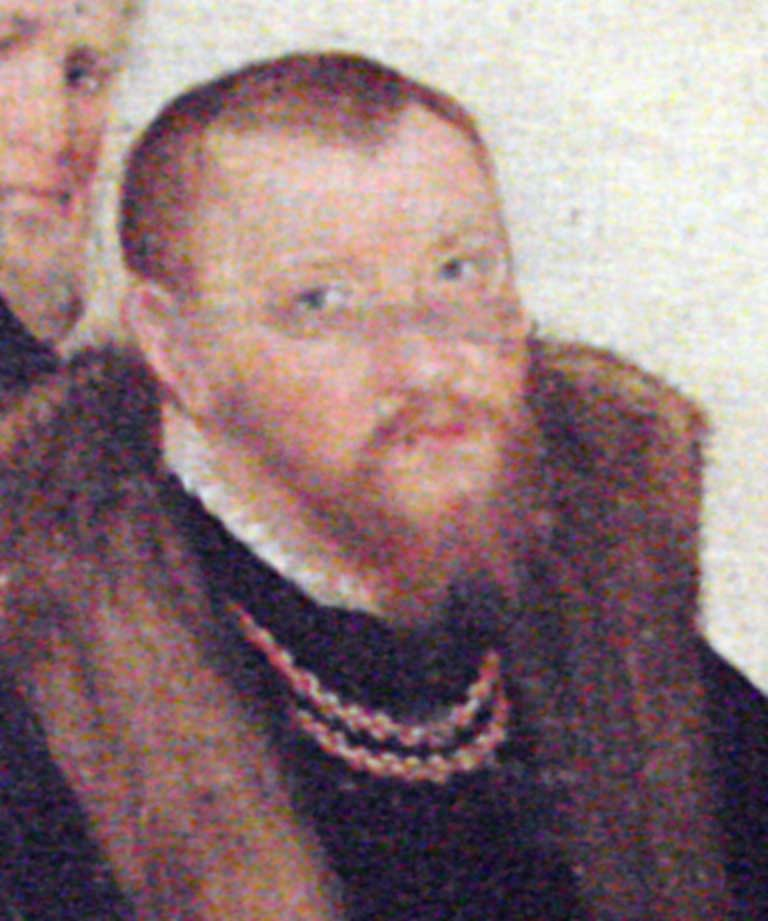
Georg Cracow

Georg Cracow, Kraków, Cracov, Cracau or Cracovius (7 November 1525, in Stettin – 17 March 1575, in Leipzig) was a German lawyer and statesman.

== Family ==
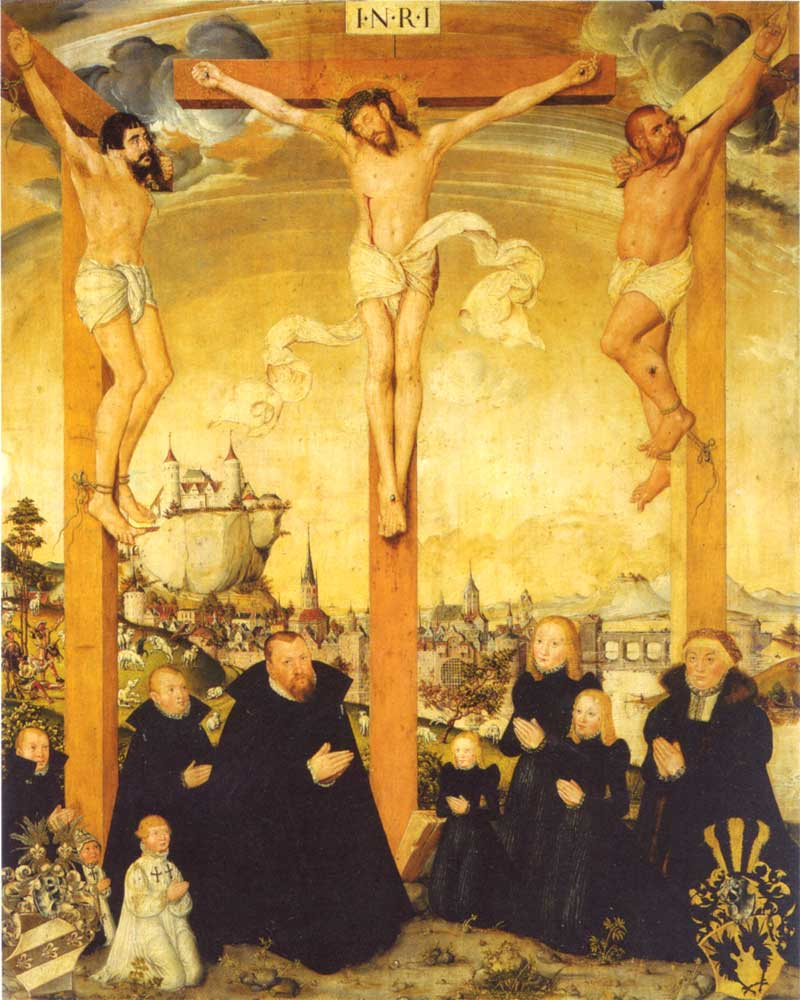
Lucas Cranach the Younger: Epitaph for Sara Cracow

In 1549 he married Sara, the first daughter of Johannes Bugenhagen.

She died in 1563 and in 1565 a memorial painting was erected in St. Mary's Church in Wittenberg, the creation of Lucas Cranach the Younger.

== Bibliography ==
- Theodor Muther: Cracow, Georg. In: Allgemeine Deutsche Biographie (ADB). Vol 4, Duncker & Humblot, Leipzig 1876, p. 540–543.
- Hellmut Kretzschmar (1957). "Cracov, Georg". Neue Deutsche Biographie (in German). Vol. 3. Berlin: Duncker & Humblot. pp. 385–386.
- Heinz Scheible (2001). "Peucer, Caspar". Neue Deutsche Biographie (in German). Vol. 20. Berlin: Duncker & Humblot. pp. 278–279. (Nebeneintrag)
- Christian Gottlieb Jöcher: Allgemeines Gelehrten–Lexikon. Band 1, Sp. 2162
- Walter Friedensburg: Geschichte der Universität Wittenberg. Max Niemeyer, Halle (Saale) 1917
- Otto Vogt: Dr. Johannes Bugenhagens Briefwechsel. Hildesheim 1966, Mit einem Vorwort und Nachträgen von Eike Wolgast, Reprint der Ausgaben Stettin 1888–99 und Gotha 1910, weiter ergänzt
- Theodor Wotschke: Aus Wittenberger Kirchenbüchern. In: Archiv für Reformationsgeschichte (ARG). 1932, Seite 208
- Gustav Stier: Corpusculum Inscriptionum Vitebergensium – Die Lateinischen Inschriften Wittenbergs. Herrose, Wittenberg 1860
- Julius Köstlin: Die Baccaulaurei und Magistri der Wittenberger Philosophischen Fakultät (1503–1560). Halle 1887
- Matrikel der Universität Wittenberg von 1502–1610
- Heinz Scheible: Melanchthons Briefwechsel Personen. Band 11
- "Entry". Zedlers Universallexikon. Vol. 15. p. 810.
- Cracow, Georg. In: Meyers Konversations-Lexikon 1885–1892, 4. Band, Seite 322
- Helmar Junghans: Verzeichnis der Rektoren, Prorektoren, Dekane, Professoren und Schloßkirchenprediger der Leucorea vom Sommersemester 1536 bis zum Wintersemester 1574/75. In: Irene Dingel, Günther Wartenberg: Georg Major (1502–1574). Ein Theologe der Wittenberger Reformation. Evangelische Verlagsanstalt, Leipzig 2005, ISBN 3-374-02332-0
