= Stadtkirche Wittenberg =

Civic church of Lutherstadt Wittenberg, Germany

Town Church in Wittenberg
UNESCO World Heritage Site
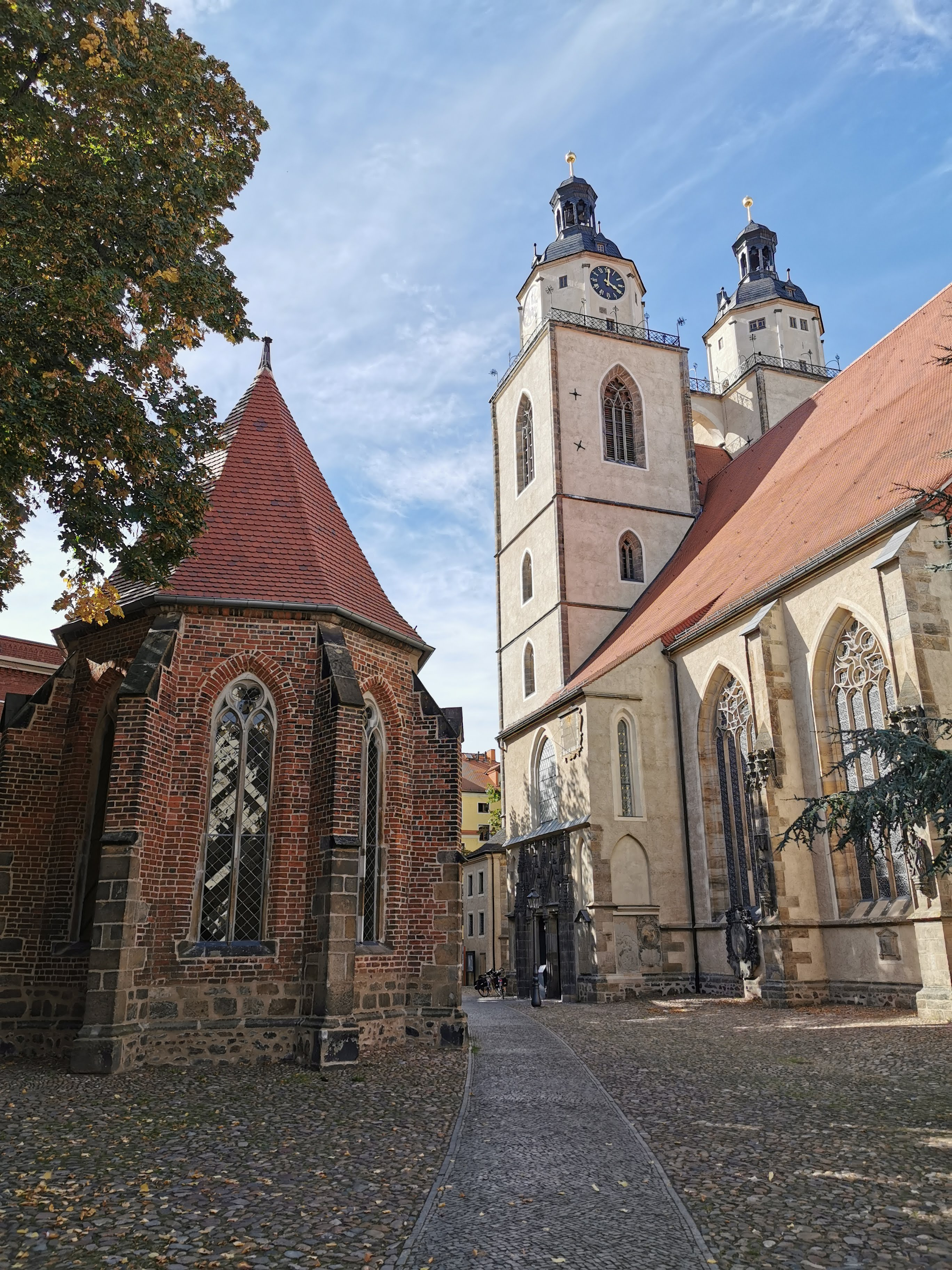

- Location within Germany Location within Saxony-Anhalt
- Location: Lutherstadt Wittenberg, Wittenberg, Saxony-Anhalt, Germany
- Part of: Luther Memorials in Eisleben and Wittenberg
- Criteria: Cultural: (iv)(vi)
- Reference: 783-005
- Inscription: 1996 (20th Session)
- Area: 0.19 ha (20,000 sq ft)
- Buffer zone: 0.94 ha (101,000 sq ft)
- Coordinates: 51°52′0.60″N 12°38′42.20″E

Stadtkirche Wittenberg

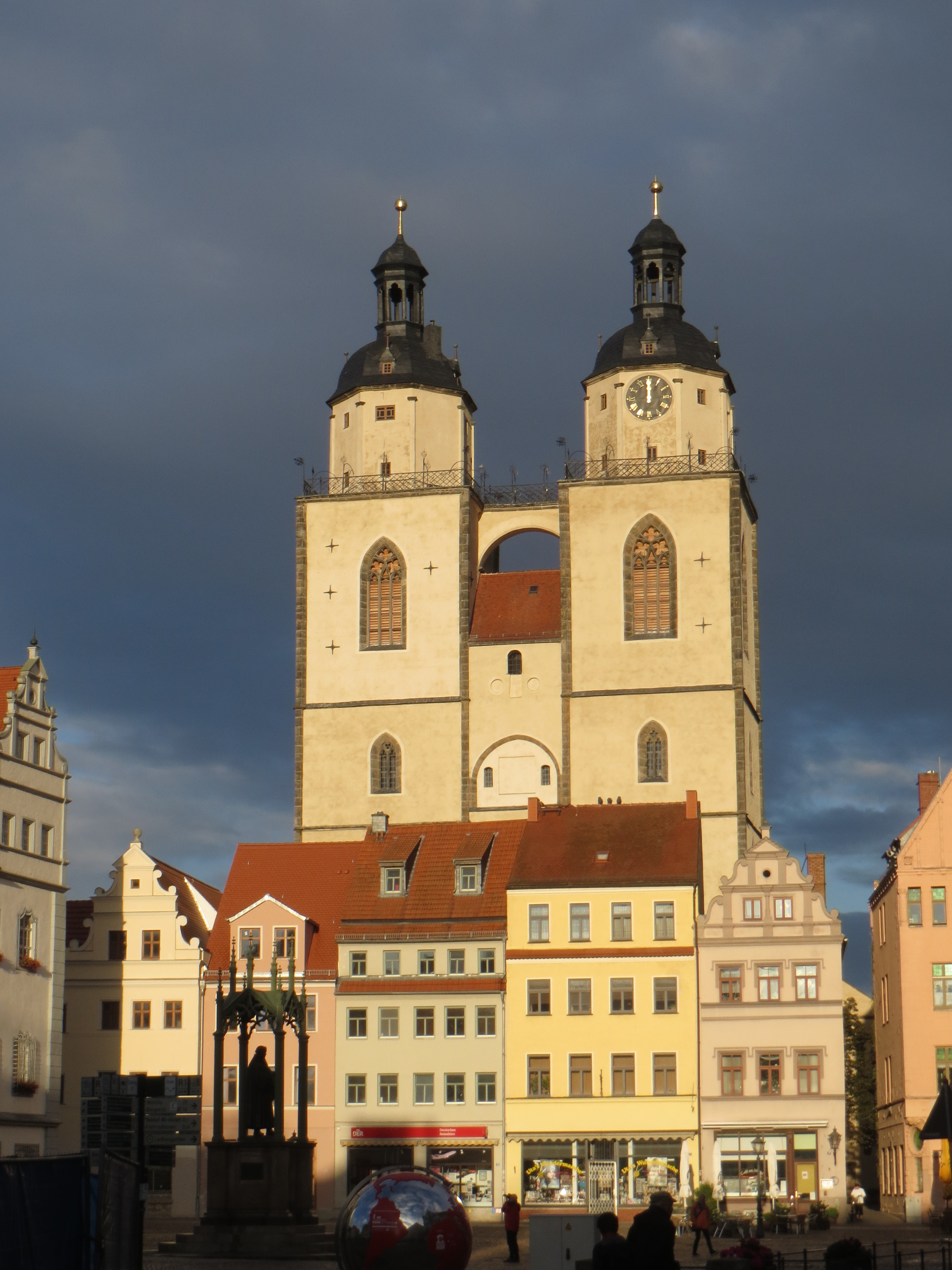
The Stadtkirche from the market square, 2015

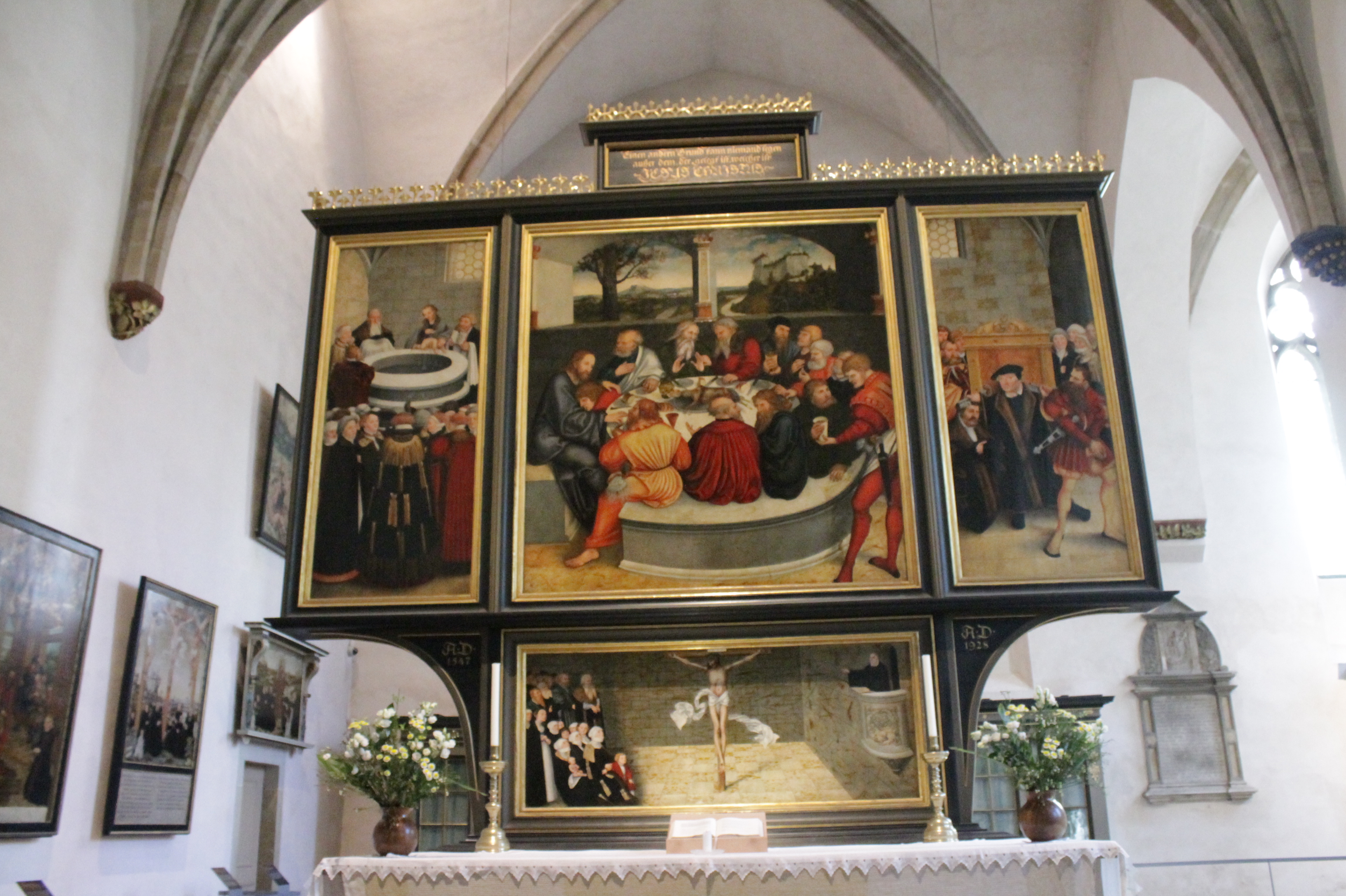
Cranach's altarpiece, Stadtkirche, Wittenberg

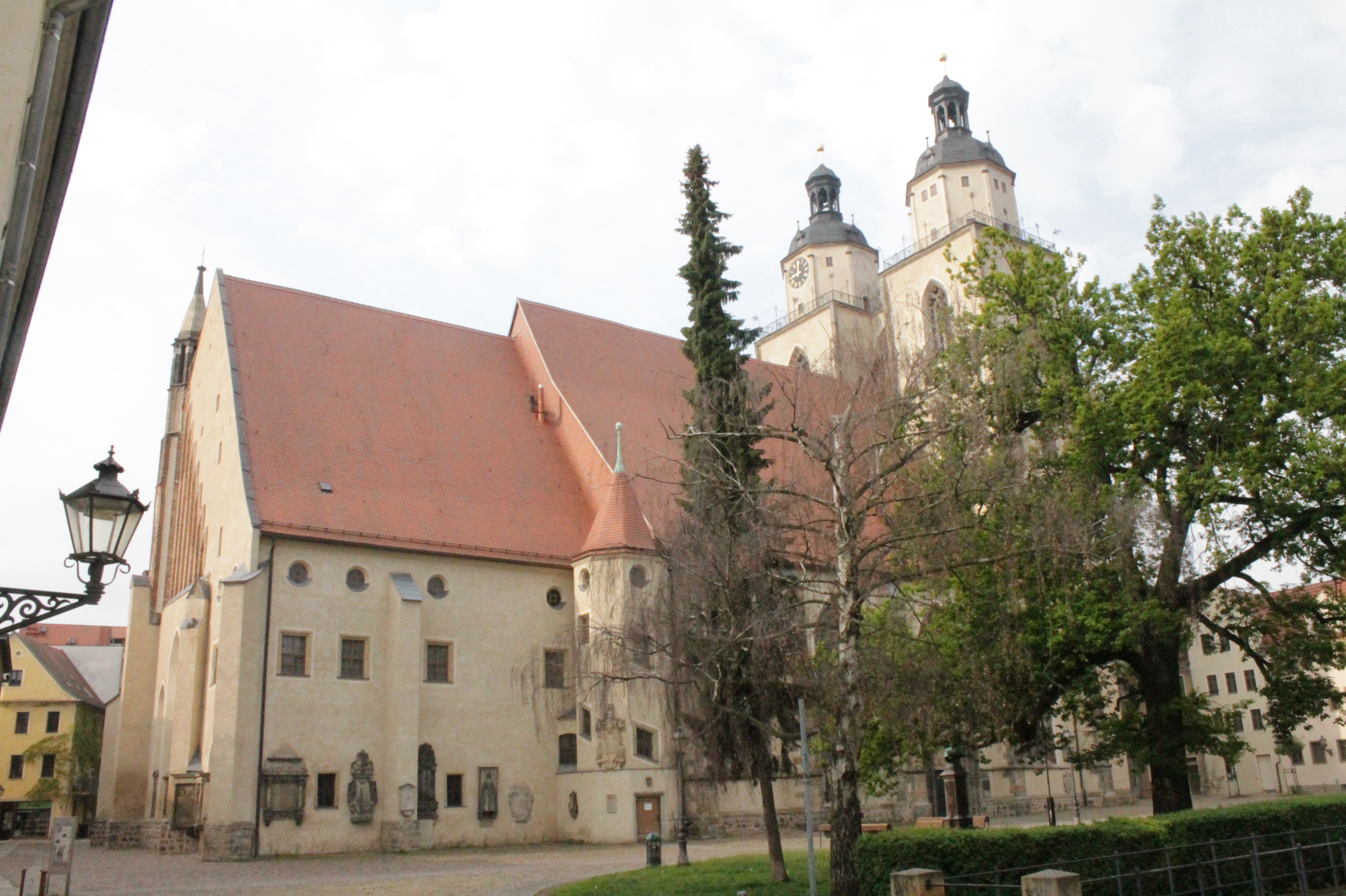
Stadtkirche Wittenberg from the north east

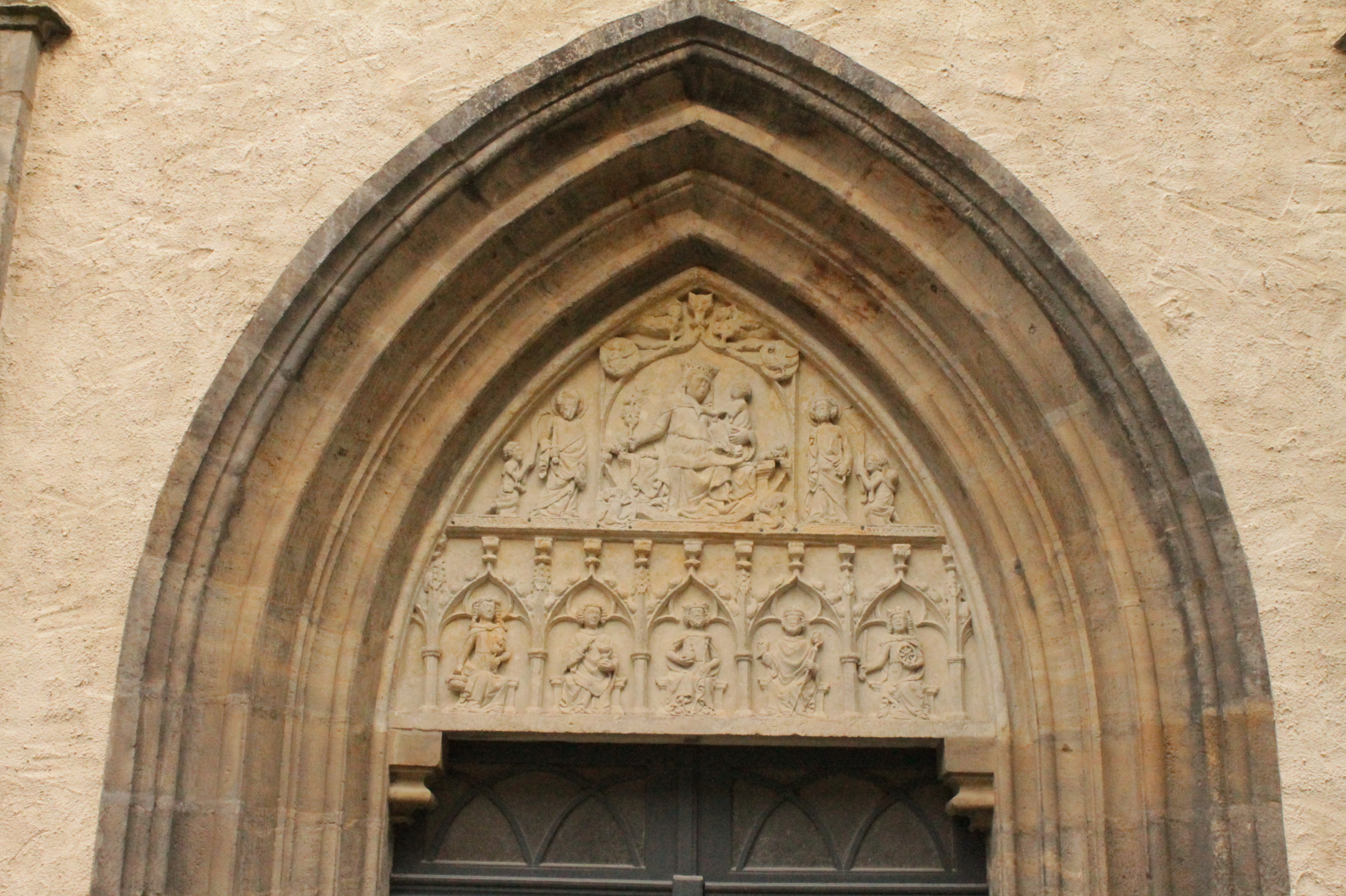
Decoration over west door, Stadtkirche Wittenberg

The Stadt- und Pfarrkirche St. Marien zu Wittenberg (Town and Parish Church of St. Mary's) is the civic church of the German town of Lutherstadt Wittenberg. The reformers Martin Luther and Johannes Bugenhagen preached there and the building also saw the first celebration of the mass in German rather than Latin and the first ever distribution of the bread and wine to the congregation – it is thus considered the mother-church of the Protestant Reformation. In 1996, it was inscribed on the UNESCO World Heritage List along with Castle Church of All Saints (Schlosskirche), the Lutherhaus, the Melanchthonhaus, and Martin Luther's birth house and death house in Eisleben, because of its religious significance and testimony to the lasting, global influence of Protestantism.

== History ==
The first mention of the Pfarrkirche St.-Marien dates to 1187. Originally a wooden church in the Diocese of Brandenburg, in 1280 the present chancel and the chancel's south aisle were built. Between 1412 and 1439 the nave was replaced by the present three-aisle structure and the two towers built, originally crowned by stone pyramids.

The first Protestant service was held here by Luther at Christmas 1521.

In 1522, in the wake of the iconoclasm begun by Andreas Bodenstein, almost the whole interior decoration was demolished and removed, leaving the still-surviving High Medieval Judensau on the exterior of the south wall. On his return to Wittenberg from the Wartburg, Luther preached his famous invocavit sermons in the Stadtkirche. Luther married Katharina von Bora here on 13 June 1525, the service being conducted by his colleague and friend, Johannes Bugenhagen.

In 1547, during the Schmalkaldic War, the towers' stone pyramids were removed to make platforms for cannon. Despite the war, an altarpiece by Lucas Cranach the Elder was unveiled in the church. In 1556 the platforms were replaced by the surviving octagonal caps, a clock and a clock-keeper's dwelling. This was followed by an extension of the east end and the overlying 'Ordinandenstube'. In 1811 the interior of the church was redesigned to a Neo-Gothic scheme by Carlo Ignazio Pozzi.

The church was again restored in 1928 and also 1980–1983.

== Altarpiece ==
The church contains a masterly altarpiece by Lucas Cranach the Younger. Cranach lived in Wittenberg for most of his life, for this reason, many rich patrons chose to have a memorial painting by Cranach, rather than a gravestone. These encircle the altarpiece.

== Tombs of interest ==
- Johannes Bugenhagen
- Memorial painting to Sara Cracow (d.1563), daughter of Bugenhagen, by Cranach
- Lucas Cranach the Younger
- Paul Eber memorial by Cranach
- Memorial to Melchior Fend (d.1564) "Jesus in the Temple" by Peter Spitzer and Cranach
- Memorial to Franziskus Oldehorst (d.1565) by Cranach and Peter Spitzer
- Memorial painting of Caspar Niemeck (d.1562) by Cranach
- Memorial painting to Samuel Selfisch (d.1615)
- Memorial painting to Nikolaus von Seidlitz (d.1582) "Christ risen from his Tomb" by Augustin Cranach

== Organ ==
The organ of the town church was built in 1983 by the organ builder Sauer. Parts of the previous organs were used. The large mid-section of the prospectus was taken from the organ of 1811, and some of the organ's registers of 1928 were also reused. The instrument has 53 registers on three manuals and a pedal.

== General superintendents and superintendents ==
From 1533 to 1817 the Stadtkirche's pastor was also general superintendent of the Saxon Electoral Circle (Kurkreis) and thus granted to the top theological lecturer at the University of Wittenberg.

1. Johannes Bugenhagen (1533–1558)
2. Paul Eber (1558–1569)
3. Friedrich Widebrand (1570–1574)
4. Kaspar Eberhard (1574–1575)
5. Polykarp Leyser the Elder (1576–1587)
6. David Voit (1587–1589)
7. Urban Pierius also: Birnbaum (1590–1591)
8. Polykarp Leyser the Elder (1593–1594)
9. Ägidius Hunnius the Elder (1594–1603)
10. Georg Mylius (1603–1607)
11. Friedrich Balduin (1607–1627)
12. Paul Röber (1627–1651)
13. Abraham Calov (1656–1686)
14. Balthasar Bebel (1686)
15. Caspar Löscher (1687–1718)
16. Gottlieb Wernsdorf der Ältere (1719–1729)
17. Johann Georg Abicht (1730–1740)
18. Karl Gottlob Hofmann (1740–1774)
19. Johann Friedrich Hirt (1775–1783)
20. Karl Christian Tittmann (1784–1789)
21. Karl Ludwig Nitzsch (1790–1817)

In 1817 the Congress of Vienna merged the University of Wittenberg with the University of Halle and the post of general superintendent became one of superintendent, still tied to the pastorate of the Stadtkirche :

1. Karl Ludwig Nitzsch (1817–1831)
2. Heinrich Leonhard Heubner (1832–1853)
3. Immanuel Friedrich Emil Sander (1853–1859)
4. Karl August Schapper (1860–1866)
5. Karl Otto Bernhard Romberg (1867–1877)
6. Georg Christian Rietschel (1878–1887)
7. Carl Wilhelm Emil Quandt (1888–1908)
8. Friedrich Wilhelm Orthmann (1908–1923)
9. Maximilian Meichßner (1926–1954)
10. Gerhard Böhm (1956–1976)
11. Albrecht Steinwachs (1976–1997)

Since 1999 the post of superintendent has not been tied to any pastorate, so the next superintendent of the Wittenberg church-circle will not ex officio be pastor of the Stadtkirche.

== Judensau ==
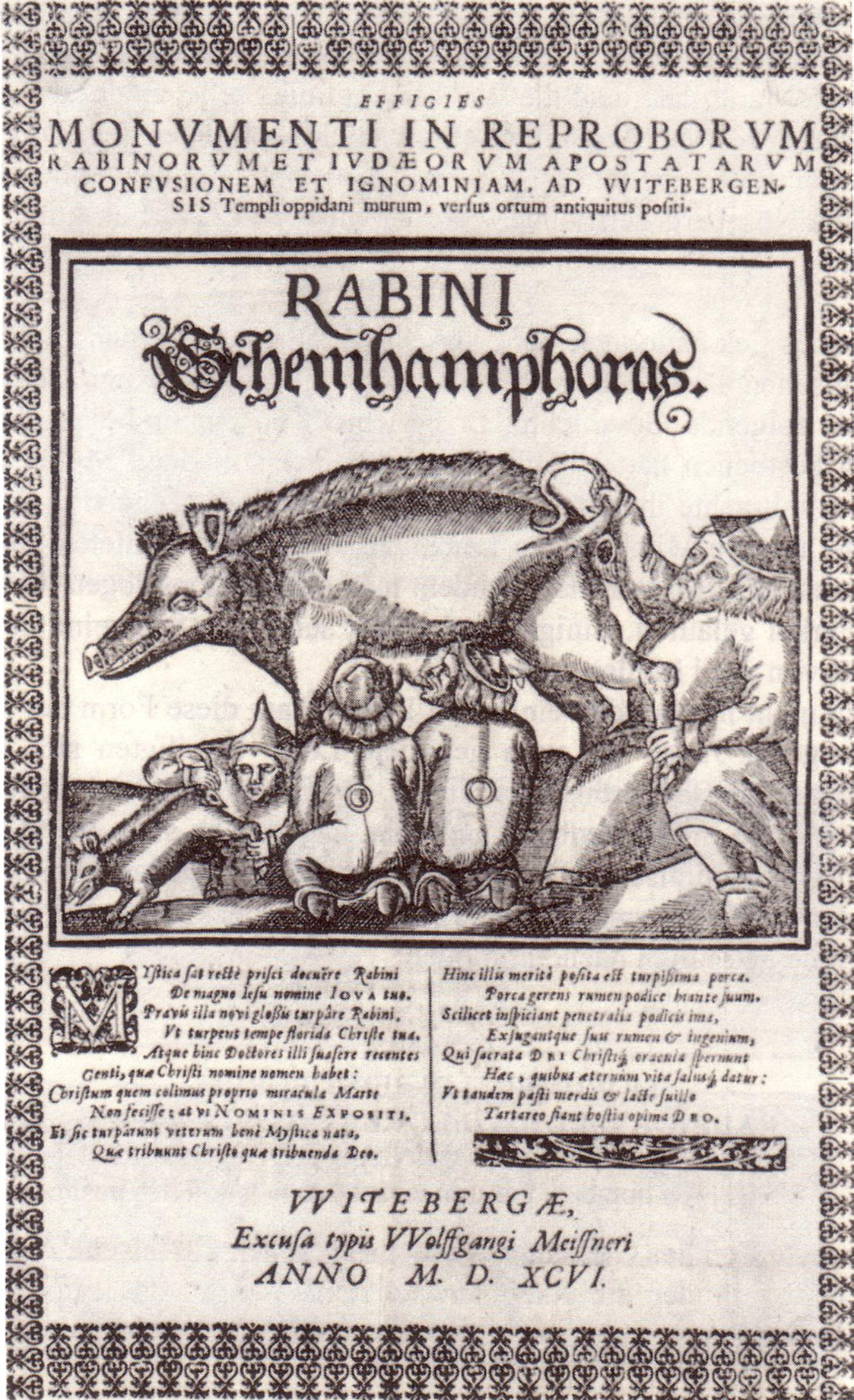
The Judensau at Wittenberg.

The facade of the church has a Judensau, or Jew's pig, from 1305. It portrays a rabbi who looks under the sow's tail, and other Jews drinking from its teats. An inscription reads "Rabini Shem hamphoras," gibberish which presumably bastardizes "shem ha-meforasch" (a secret name of God; see Shemhamphorasch). The sculpture is one of the last remaining examples in Germany of "medieval Jew baiting." In 1988, on the occasion of the 50th anniversary of the Kristallnacht, debate sprung up about the monument, which resulted in the addition of a sculpture recognizing that during the Holocaust six million Jews were murdered "under the sign of the cross".

In Vom Schem Hamphoras (1543), Luther comments on the Judensau sculpture at Wittenberg, echoing the antisemitism of the image and locating the Talmud in the sow's bowels:

Here on our church in Wittenberg a sow is sculpted in stone. Young pigs and Jews lie suckling under her. Behind the sow a rabbi is bent over the sow, lifting up her right leg, holding her tail high and looking intensely under her tail and into her Talmud, as though he were reading something acute or extraordinary, which is certainly where they get their Shemhamphoras.

In 2022, The Federal Court of Justice upheld rulings for the preservation of the Judensau; when clarifying its stance, the court stated that the church provided historical context for the sculpture and condemned it.

== Gallery ==
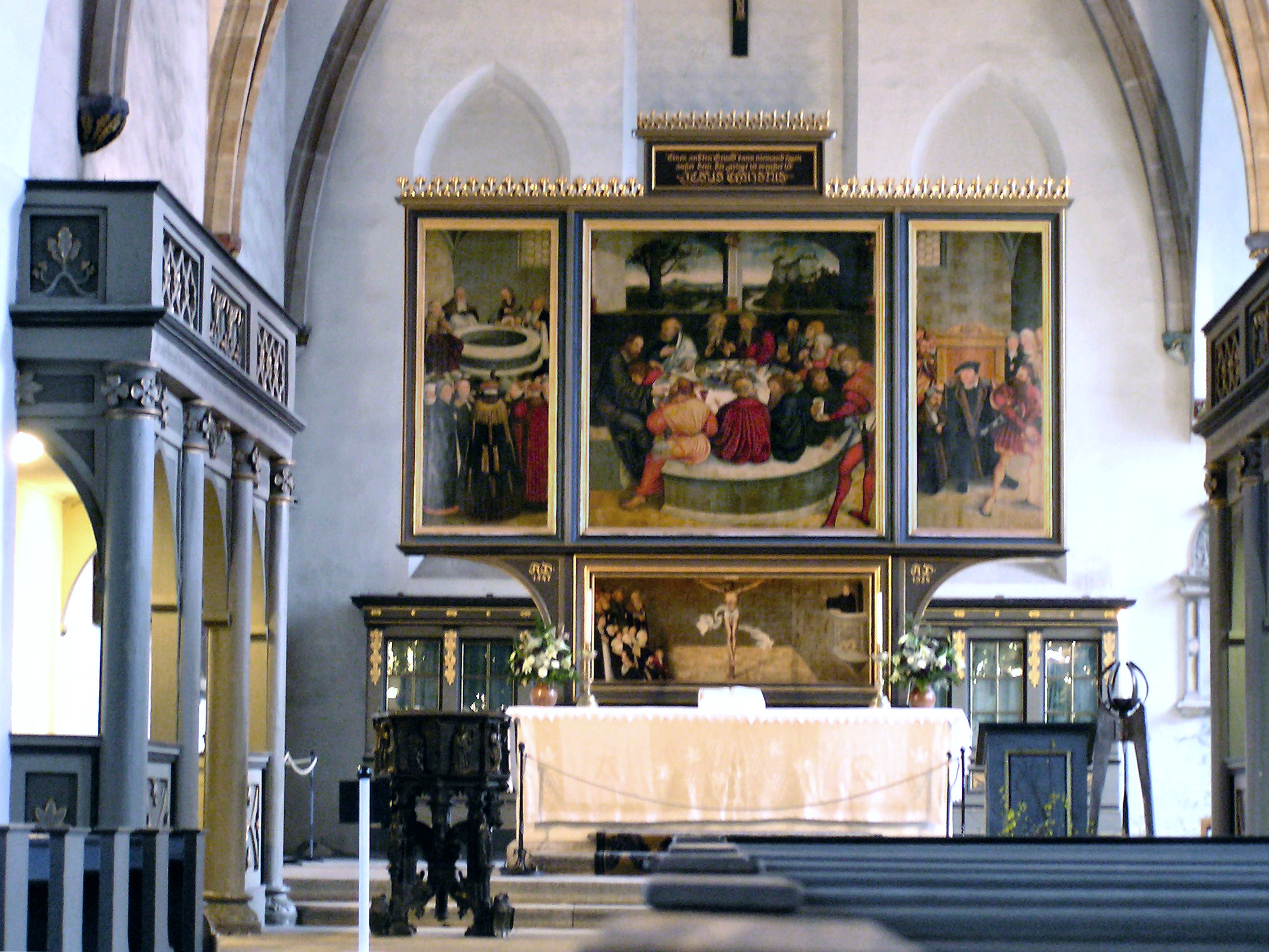
The altarpiece by Lucas Cranach the Elder and son Lucas Cranach the Younger

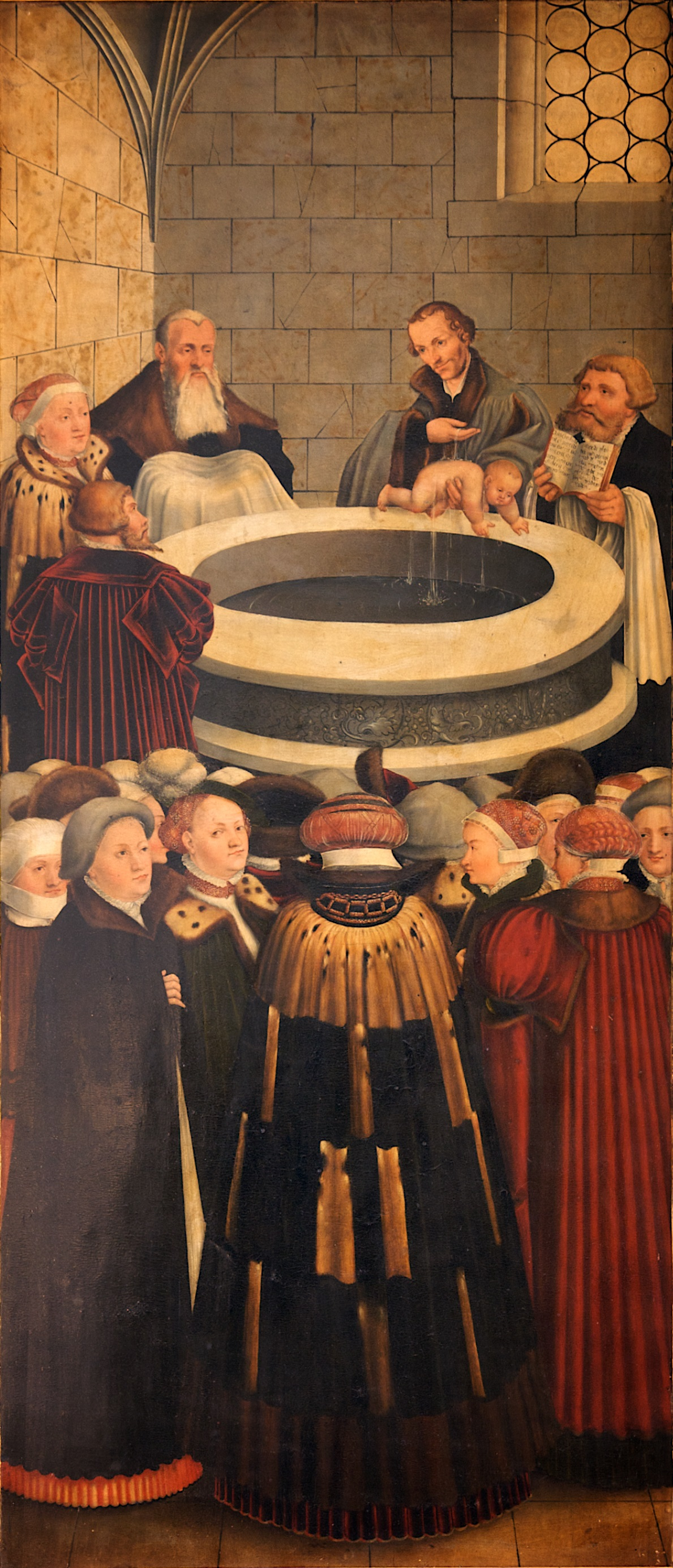
Left panel: (Philipp Melanchthon administered the baptism)

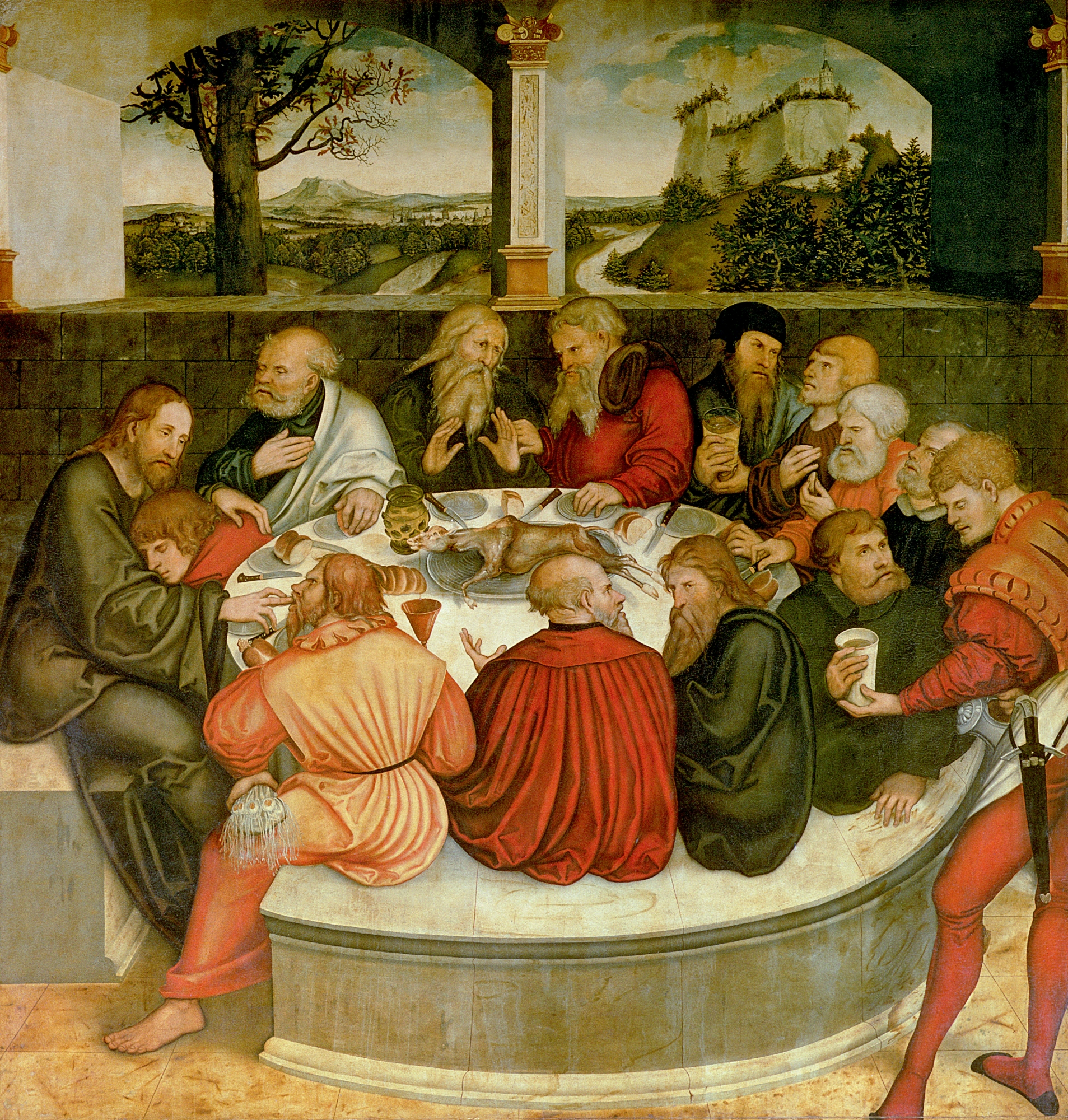
Central panel: (The Last Supper)

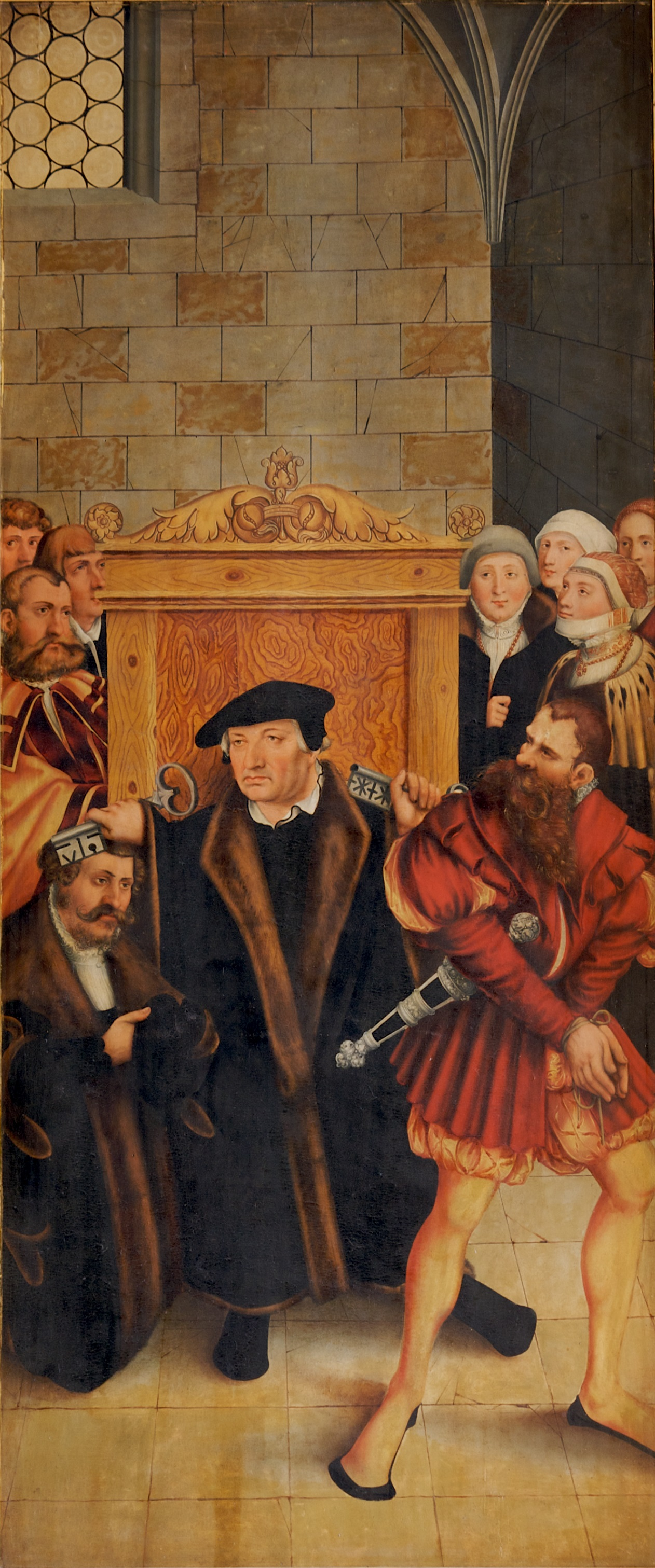
Right panel: (Johannes Bugenhagen administering "the key's power")

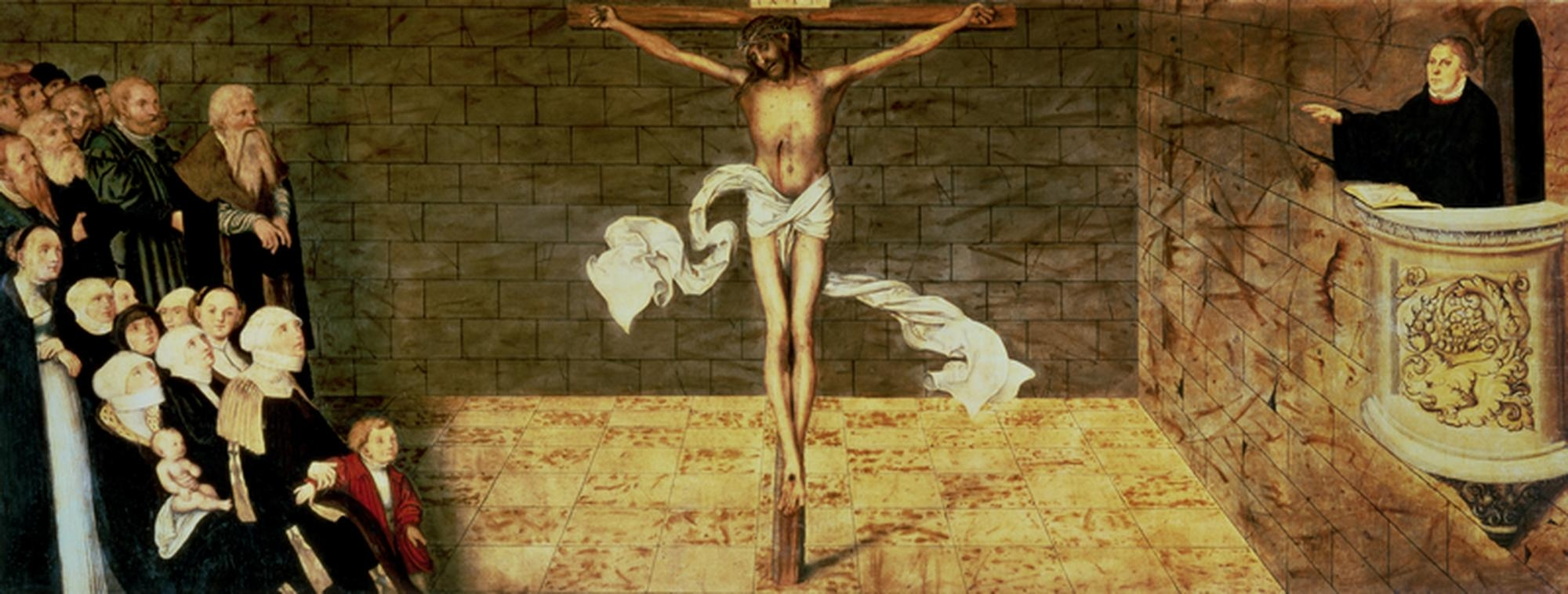
Low panel: (Martin Luther preaching before an image of Christ)
