= Kaspar Eberhard =

German Lutheran theologian and teacher (1523–1575)

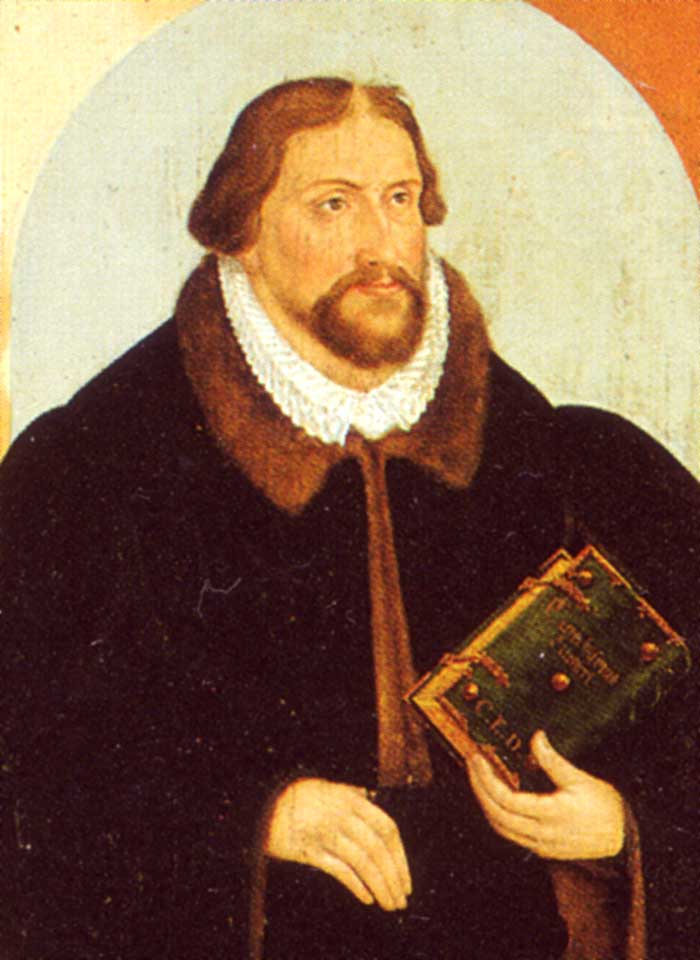
Kaspar Eberhard by Lucas Cranach the Younger.

Kaspar Eberhard (21 March 1523 – 20 October 1575) was a German Lutheran theologian and teacher. He was born at Schneeberg, and died at Wittenberg.

== Bibliography ==
- Walter Friedensburg: Geschichte der Universität Wittenberg. Max Niemeyer, Halle (Saale) 1917,
- Irene Dingel, Günther Wartenberg: Die Theologische Fakultät Wittenberg 1502 bis 1602, Leipzig 2002, ISBN 3-374-02019-4
- Archiv für Reformationsgeschichte (ARG) Jahrgang 29, Leipzig 1932, S. 97-132
- Archiv für Reformationsgeschichte (ARG) Jahrgang 30, Leipzig 1933, S. 43
- Archiv für Reformationsgeschichte (ARG) Jahrgang 31, Leipzig 1934, S. 57
- Archiv für Reformationsgeschichte (ARG) Jahrgang 34, Leipzig 1937, S. 167-169
- Christian Gottlieb Jöcher: Allgemeines Gelehrten–Lexikon. 2. Teil, Leipzig 1750
- Balthasar Mencii: Historica Narratio, de Septem Electoribus..., Frankfurt 1577 S. 129
- Hans Peter Hasse: Zensur theologischer Bücher in Kursachsen im konfessionellen Zeitalter, 2000
- Georg Loesche:Johannes Mathesius-Ein Lebens- und Sitten-Bild aus der Reformationszeit. Bd. I, S. 183–185, Gotha, Perthes 1895 und 1971
- Heinz Scheible (Hrsg.): Melanchthons Briefwechsel. Kritische und kommentierte Gesamtausgabe. Band 11: Personen. Teil: A - E. Frommann-Holzboog, Stuttgart u. a. 2003, ISBN 3-7728-2257-6.
- Insa Christine Hennen: Fürbilde der Herde - Johannes Bugenhagen und seine Wittenberger Nachfolger, Ausstellungskatalog des Bugenhagenhauses in der Lutherstadt Wittenberg, Wittenberg Leipzig 2007
- Veronika Albrecht Birkner: Pfarrerbuch der Kirchenprovinz Sachsen. Evangelische Verlagsanstalt, Leipzig, 2004, Bd. 2, S. 389 ISBN 3-374-02134-4
- Helmar Junghans: Verzeichnis der Rektoren, Prorektoren, Dekane, Professoren und Schloßkirchenprediger der Leucorea vom Sommersemester 1536 bis zum Wintersemester 1574/75. In: Irene Dingel, Günther Wartenberg: Georg Major (1502–1574) - Ein Theologe der Wittenberger Reformation. Evangelische Verlagsanstalt, Leipzig, 2005, ISBN 3-374-02332-0
