= Lutherhaus =

Luther Hall
UNESCO World Heritage Site
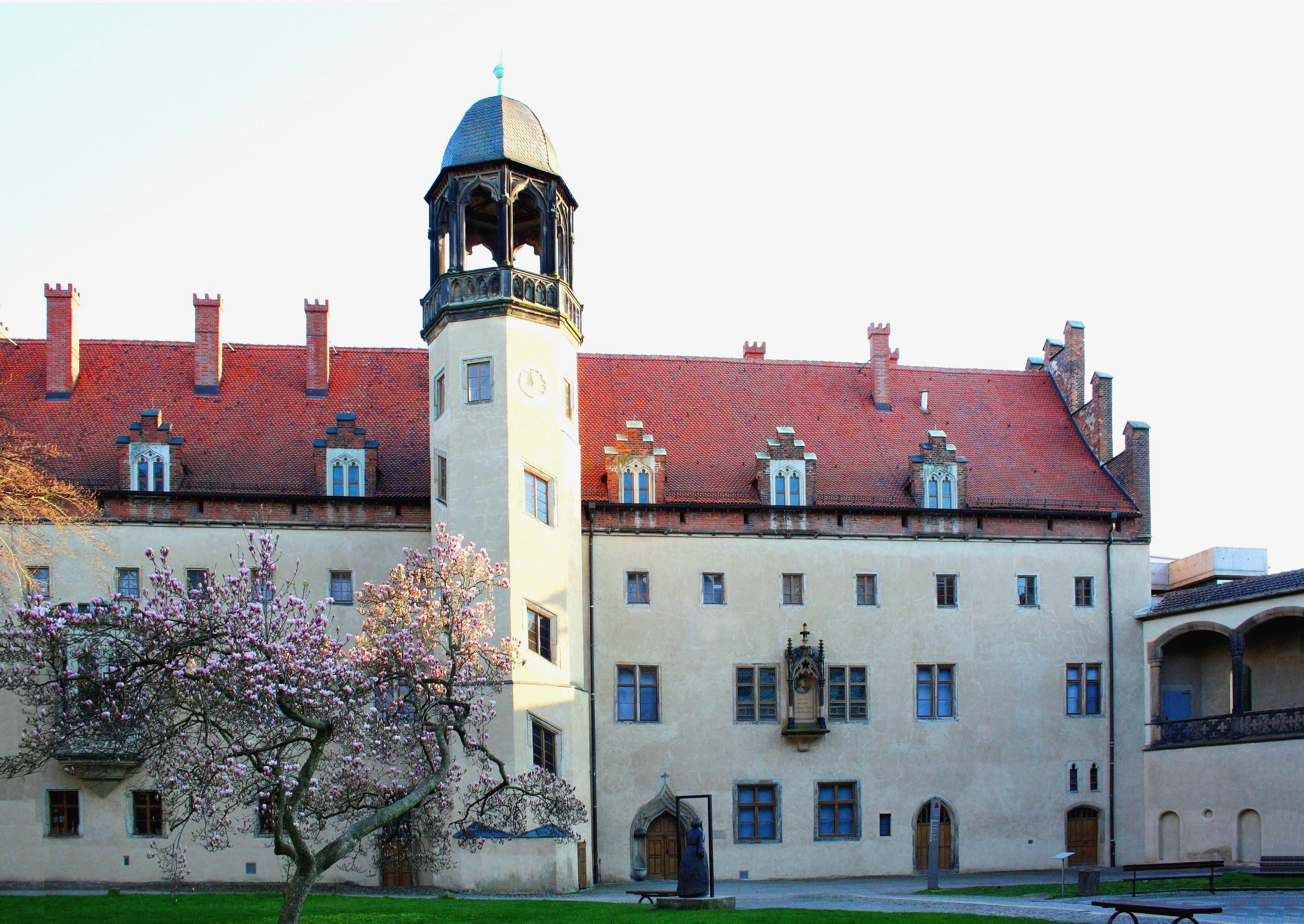
- The Lutherhaus in Wittenberg

- Location within Germany Location within Saxony-Anhalt
- Location: Lutherstadt Wittenberg, Wittenberg, Saxony-Anhalt, Germany
- Part of: Luther Memorials in Eisleben and Wittenberg
- Criteria: Cultural: (iv)(vi)
- Reference: 783-003
- Inscription: 1996 (20th Session)
- Area: 0.16 ha (0.40 acres)
- Buffer zone: 5.57 ha (13.8 acres)
- Coordinates: 51°51′52.60″N 12°39′9.80″E

The Lutherhaus is a writer's house museum in Lutherstadt Wittenberg, Germany. Originally built in 1504 as part of the University of Wittenberg, the building was the home of Martin Luther for most of his adult life and a significant location in the history of the Protestant Reformation. Luther was living here when he wrote his 95 Theses.

The Augusteum is an expansion to the original building that was constructed after Luther's death to house a Protestant seminary and library which still exist today. Since 1996, both buildings have been recognized as UNESCO World Heritage Sites along with other sites associated with Martin Luther in Wittenberg and Eisleben, because of their religious significance and testimony to one of the most influential figures of medieval Europe.

== History ==
When the university was opened in 1503, the monks of the Order of Saint Augustine were given land previously belonging to the Heilig-geist-Spital (Hospital of the Holy Spirit) located near the Elster Gate. There, they began building a cloister, known as the Black Monastery because of the color of the monks' habits, which was to be a residence hall and academy for the Augustinians studying in Wittenberg. In 1507, after his ordination as a priest, Martin Luther was sent by Johann von Staupitz to continue his study, and he took up residence in a cell in the southwest corner of the new monastery. By 1512, he had graduated as a Doctor of Theology and was part of the theological faculty of the University of Wittenberg, having the official position of Doctor of Bible. He began developing and preaching the basic tenets of the Protestant Reformation and published his 95 Theses while teaching here.

Luther lived with the Augustinians in the Black Monastery until 1521, when he was forced to hide at Wartburg Castle due to political tensions surrounding the Protestant Reformation. As the Peasants' War gained strength, parts of the Wittenberg University, including the monastery, were abandoned. In 1524, after Luther had returned to Wittenberg, the Electorate of Saxony gave the empty residence halls of the Black Monastery to the Luther family, where he lived until his death in 1546. It was here that, beginning in 1531, Martin Luther held his influential Table Talks with his students. Luther taught and wrote throughout his time there, including many revisions of his translation of the Bible. He also expanded and added to the Lutherhaus, most notably building the Katharinenportal, a carved entryway that was a birthday present to his wife.

After Luther's death in Eisleben, the Lutherhaus was sold back to the university in 1564 by his heirs. Within a year, major remodeling was begun to turn the Lutherhaus into a boarding school. The imposing exterior spiral staircase was added, the refectory was given a new vaulted ceiling, and the great hall, which had been Luther's lecture hall, was redecorated and modernized. The Lutherstube, Martin Luther's living room, was left as it was, although it was frequently used to host important guests.

In 1760, Wittenberg was attacked by Austria during the Seven Years' War, and many important buildings, particularly the Schloßkirche (city church), were severely damaged. Although the Lutherhaus survived with only minimal damage, it was the beginning of a period of decay. Between 1761 and 1813, it was used as a military hospital, particularly due to the Napoleonic Wars. Afterwards, it was given to the Royal Seminary, as the Wittenberg University was dissolved to become part of the University of Halle-Wittenberg. However, the crown was not able to use the building, and it became a free school for the poor and continued to deteriorate. Finally, the dreadful state of the building became too much to ignore, and Friedrich August Stüler was hired to restore and rebuild the Lutherhaus between the years 1853 and 1856. Except for a few minor repairs and some excavation, the building and grounds remain largely as Stüler left them.

== Augusteum ==
The Augusteum is an extension to the Lutherhaus that was commissioned by Augustus of Saxony in 1564 as a library, although actual work did not begin until 1579 under the direction of Hans Irmisch. The building was mostly ready for use in 1598, when the university library was moved there from the nearby castle. In 1686 an anatomical theater was added. This was followed, in 1736, by a museum called Anatomicum, which was essentially a collection of prepared samples and anatomical oddities, most of which were gifts from King August III.

The Augusteum continued to gain importance for the university and the city of Wittenberg. More literary collections were added, bringing the total collection to 16,000 books by the middle of the 18th century. A gallery of the Electors of Saxony was added, including genealogical charts for the kings of Denmark, Braunschweig, and Brandenburg. Many more student rooms and offices were added, beginning in 1725.

The Augusteum was also affected by the decay of the Lutherhaus, although not to the same degree. It was part of the military hospital during the Seven Years' War, and was at one point used to grow corn. However, it was able to be used as part of the Royal Seminary, in contrast to the Lutherhaus, and thus was spared most of the deterioration. It continued to operate throughout the 19th century as a seminary, and was also used to safeguard the archives from the Schloßkirche, which had nearly been destroyed during the Seven Years' War. It is still used today as a Lutheran seminary.

== Lutherhaus Museum today ==
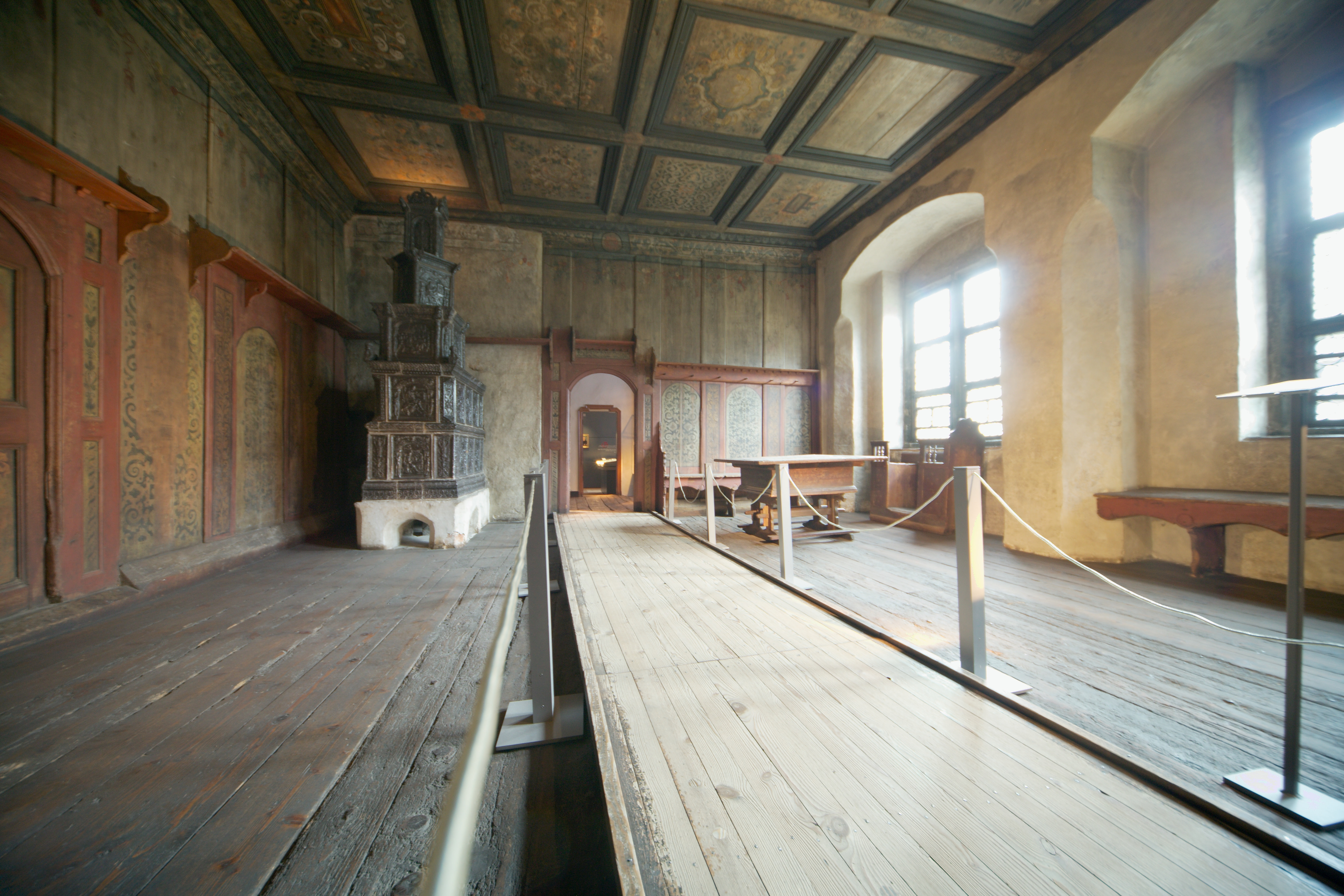
The Lutherstube (Luther's living room) in the Lutherhaus museum

Following Stüler's restoration, the decision was made to open a museum at the Lutherhaus chronicling the Reformation and Luther's lives. The first exhibits were opened to the public in 1883, and were mainly confined to the second floor, most notably the Lutherstube. Beginning in 1911, the museum gradually expanded throughout the building. To mark the 500th anniversary of Martin Luther's birth and the 100th anniversary of the founding of the museum, major expansions and renovations were carried out in 1983. In 2002, a new entrance area was completed, designed by the Berlin architecture firm Pitz and Hoh. Its very modern style was designed, in the words of the architects, to allow "function and history [to] stand visibly by each other" and was awarded the Architectural Prize of the State of Saxony-Anhalt.

The Lutherhaus is currently the world's largest museum relating to the Reformation. It contains many original objects from Luther's life, including his pulpit from the Stadtkirche, his friar's habit, several paintings by Lucas Cranach the Elder, and numerous bibles, pamphlets, and manuscripts. Currently undergoing renovations, it will remain closed until its reopening in Spring 2027.

== See also ==
- Augusteum
