= Granach =

Granach is a German surname. Notable people with the surname include:

- Alexander Granach (1893–1945), German-Austrian actor
- Gad Granach (1915–2011), German actor, son of Alexander

== See also ==
- Cranach
