= Portrait of Lucas Cranach the Elder =

1550 painting by Lucas Cranach the Elder

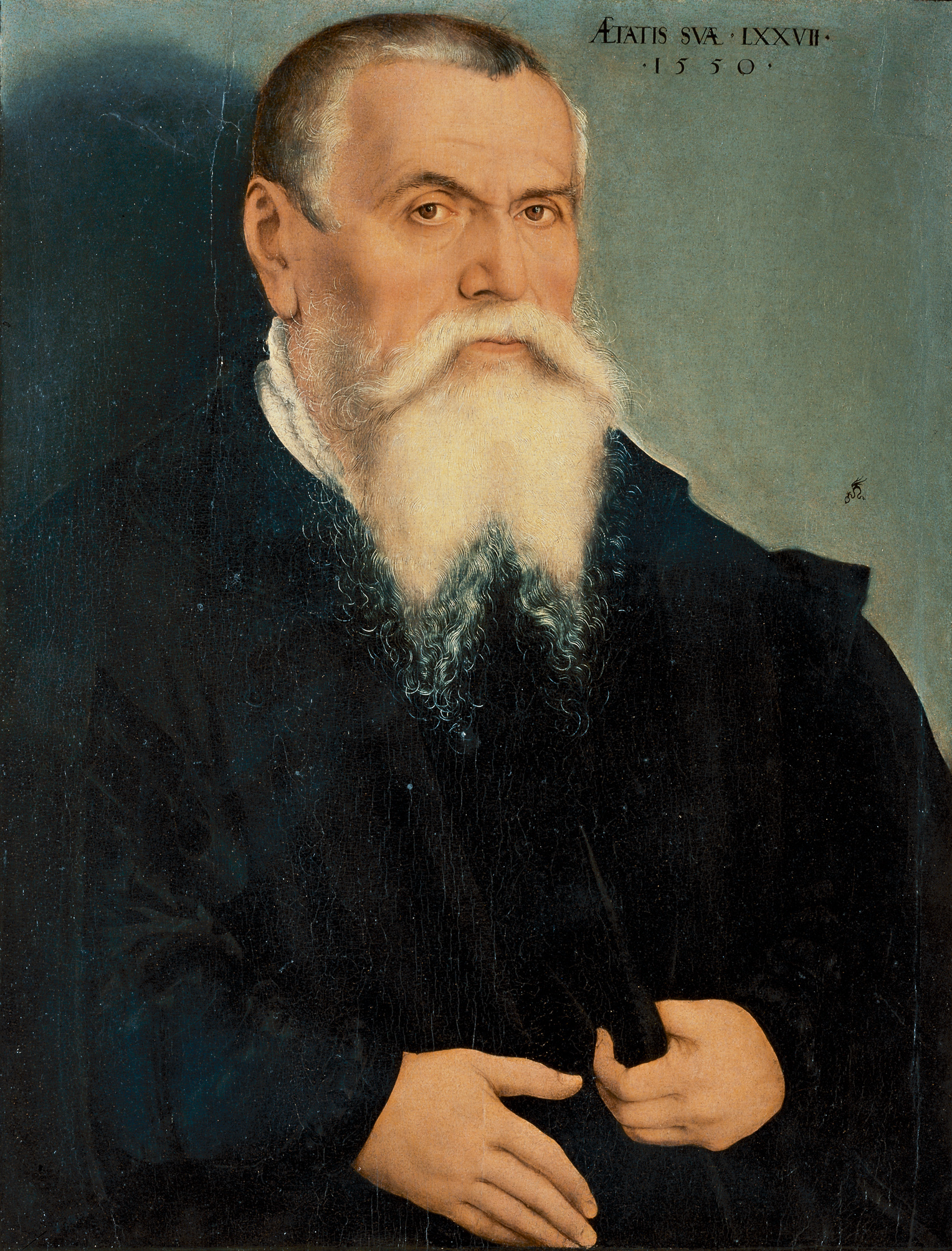
- Artist: Lucas Cranach the Younger
- Year: 1550
- Medium: oil paint, panel
- Subject: Lucas Cranach the Elder
- Dimensions: 64 cm (25 in) × 49 cm (19 in)
- Location: Dürer and German painting - hall 20
- Owner: Augustus II the Strong

Portrait of Lucas Cranach the Elder is a 1550 oil on panel portrait of Lucas Cranach the Elder. It is inscribed "Aetatis Suae LXXVII". It is held in the Uffizi, in Florence, where it entered as a self-portrait, but was later re-attributed as a painting by his son, Lucas Cranach the Younger, due to stylistic reasons. It is still in the Uffizi, whilst a copy of it with some variants is now in the Staatkirche in Weimar.

== Description ==
The artist is portrayed on a blue background, in half-length, dressed in black and turned three-quarters to the right. His face, which shows the signs of his old age, is the most intense part of the painting, capable of overshadowing even some errors done in proportion, such as the very small size of his hands and arms. The attention paid to some details is meticulous, such as the soft beard or his hair, rendered with very fine brushstrokes that define one hair at a time. His gaze is slightly frowning, its capable of giving to the portrait the appearance of a great moral dignity and awareness of his social role, as a court painter and privileged interpreter of the Lutheran Reformation, who was in direct contact with Luther himself and with Lutheran princes of his time.
