= Hans Cranach =

German painter (c. 1513–1537)

Hans Cranach (c. 1513–1537), also known as Johann Lucas Cranach, was a German painter, the oldest son of Lucas Cranach the Elder. He was born in Wittenberg, where he trained in his father's workshop alongside his younger brother Lucas Cranach the Younger. His style closely resembled his father's, and their works are often distinguishable only by monogram — "H.C." for Hans, "L.C." for Lucas the Elder. Around 1537 he travelled to Italy, dying unexpectedly in Bologna at around the age of 24. Following his death, Lucas the Younger assumed greater responsibilities in the family workshop. German art historian Johann Christian Schuchardt, who discovered his existence, credits him with an altar-piece at Weimar, signed with the monogram "H. C.", and dated 1537. He died at Bologna in 1537. Luther mentions his death in his Table Talk, and Johann Stigel, a contemporary poet, celebrates him as a painter.

== Paintings ==
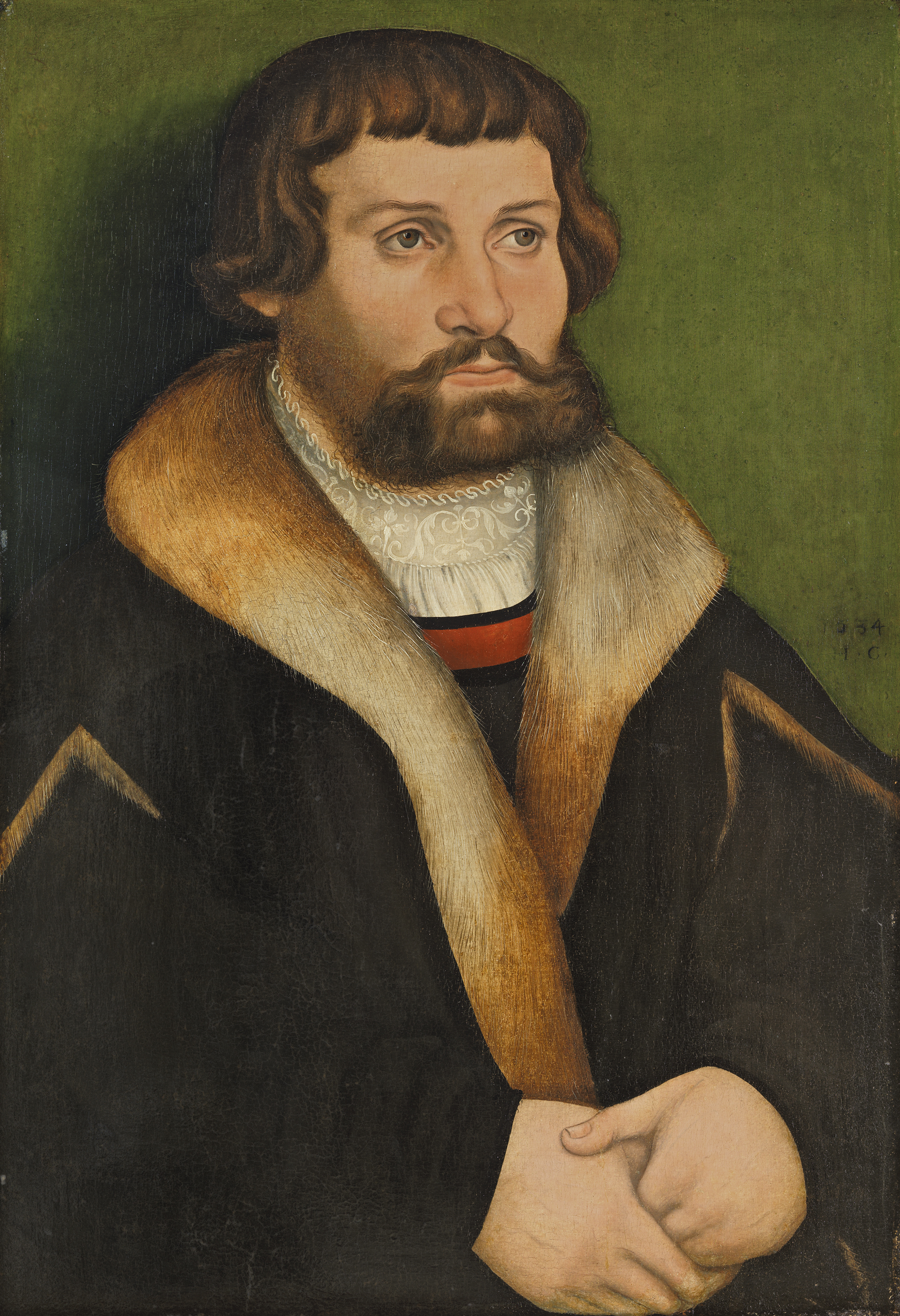
Portrait of a man, 1534, now at the Thyssen-Bornemisza Museum

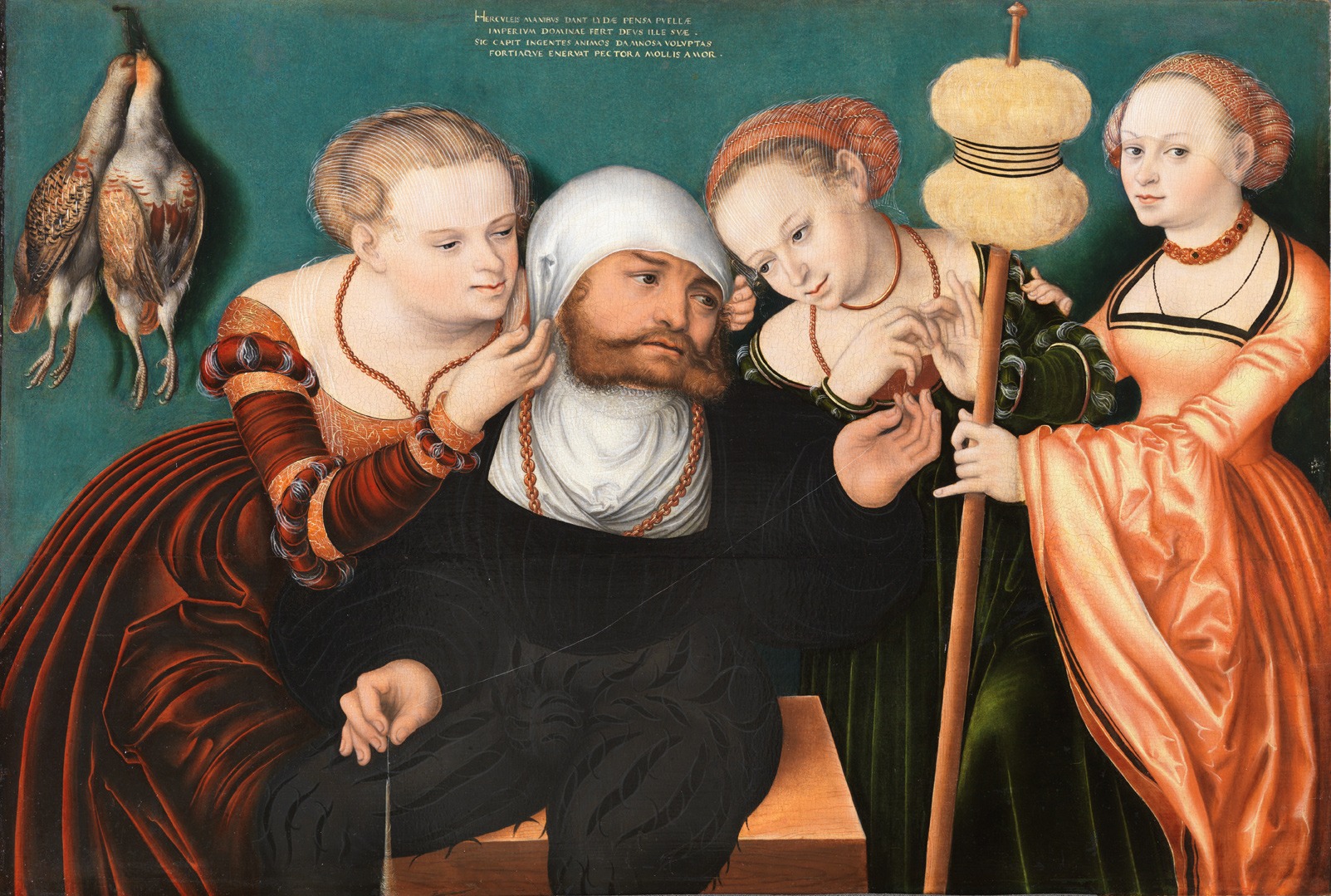
Hercules at the Court of Omphale, 1537, now at the Thyssen-Bornemisza Museum in Madrid
