= Augustin Cranach =

German painter (1554–1595)

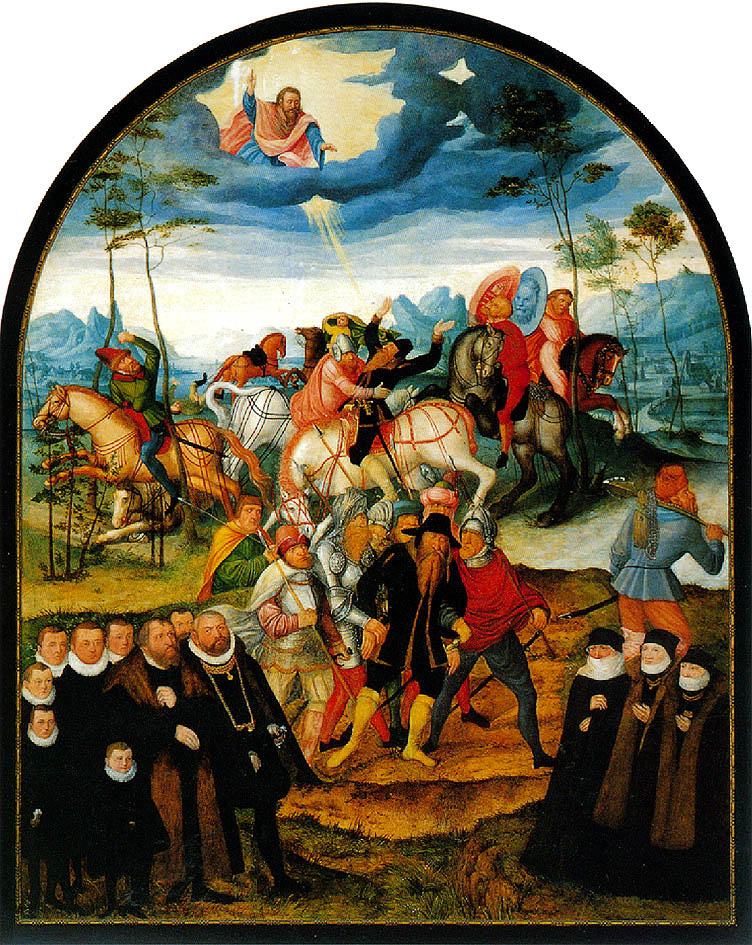
The Blinding of St. Paul (1586) oil on Canvas, about 170 x 140 cm

Augustin Cranach (1554 — 26 July 1595) was a German painter. He was born and died in Wittenberg, and was the son of Lucas Cranach the Younger and Magdalena Schurff. He was the father of Lucas Cranach III. Augustin continued the Cranach family's multi-generational association with Wittenberg, where the family home had served as residence to notable figures including the exiled King Christian II of Denmark and Katharina von Bora before her marriage to Martin Luther. His known surviving work includes The Blinding of St. Paul (1586), an oil on canvas measuring approximately 170 × 140 cm, painted in the Lutheran devotional tradition maintained by his father and grandfather.

== See also ==
- List of German painters
