= Lucas Cranach the Younger =

German Renaissance artist (1515–1586)

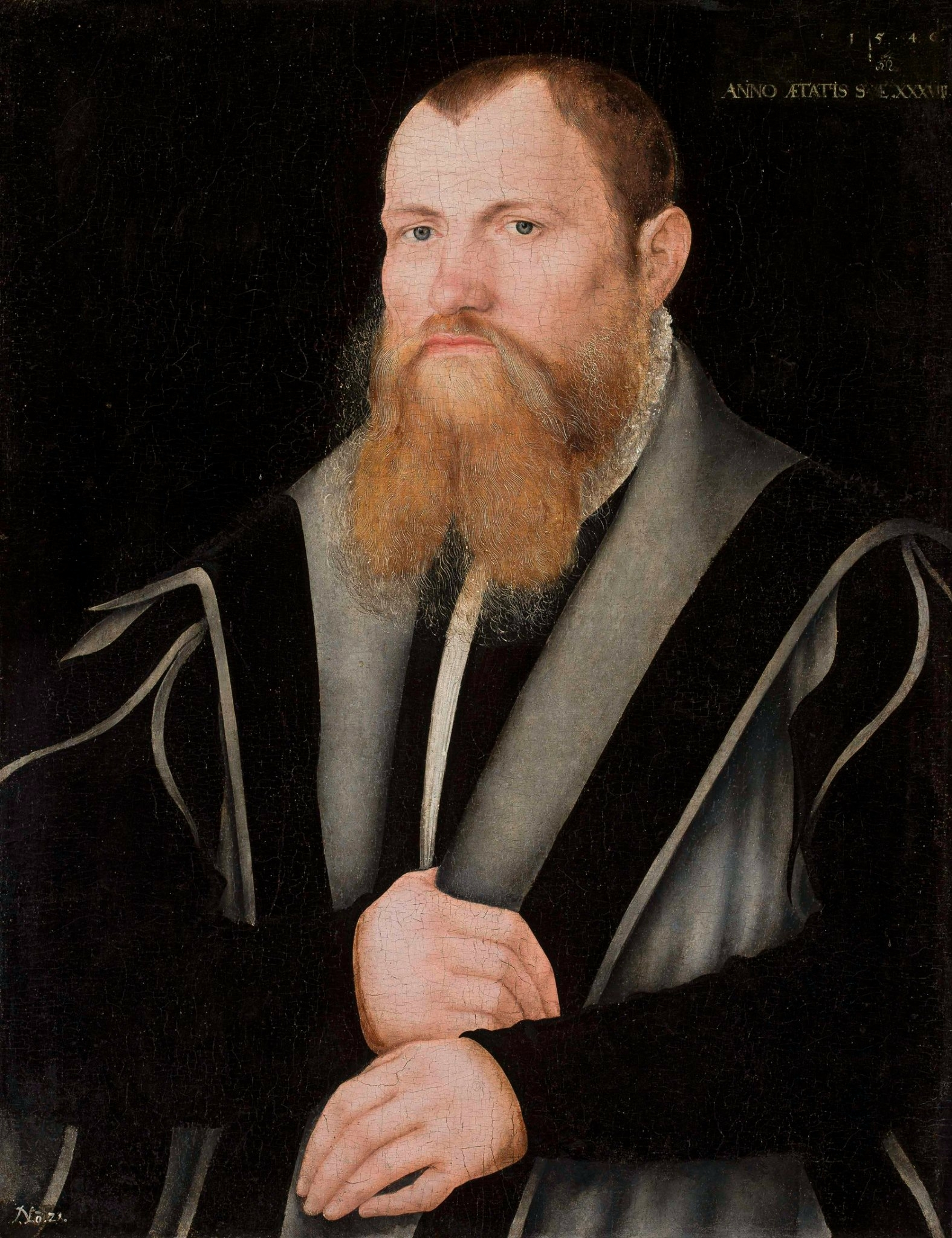
- Portrait of a Bearded Man, a possible self-portrait (c. 1546)
- Born: 4 October 1515; Wittenberg, Electorate of Saxony, Holy Roman Empire
- Died: 25 January 1586 (aged 70); Wittenberg, Electorate of Saxony, Holy Roman Empire
- Known for: Painting
- Movement: German Renaissance

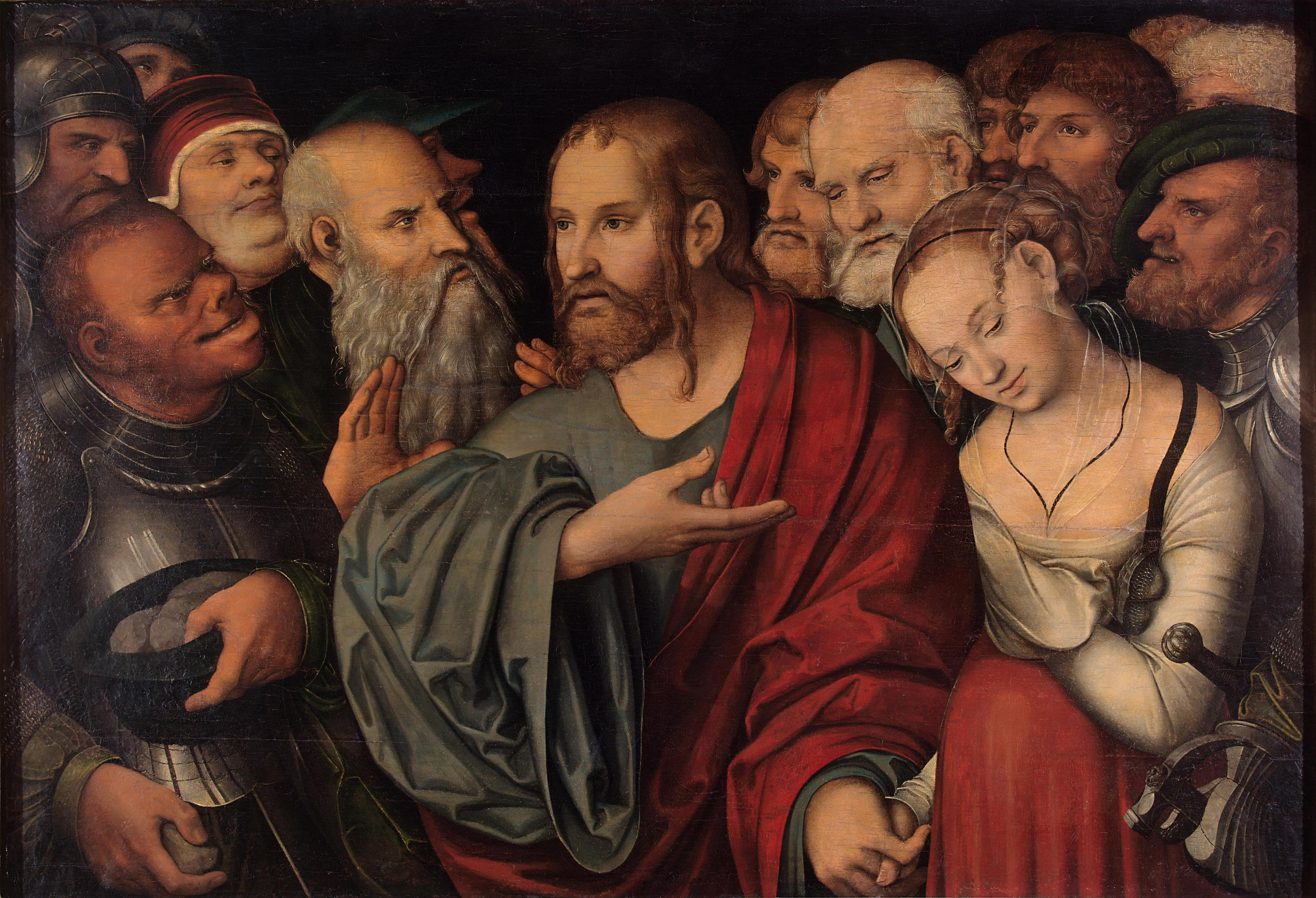
Christ and the Woman Taken in Adultery Hermitage Museum, Russia

Lucas Cranach the Younger (German: Lucas Cranach der Jüngere, IPA: [ˈluːkas ˈkʁaːnax deːɐ̯ ˈjʏŋəʁə]; 4 October 1515 – 25 January 1586) was a German Renaissance painter and portraitist, the son of Lucas Cranach the Elder and brother of Hans Cranach. He maintained the family's artistic workshop after the death of his father, as well as providing portrait for members of the social elite, including princes and nobles.

== Life and career ==
Lucas Cranach the Younger was born in Wittenberg, Germany on 4 October 1515, the second son of Lucas Cranach the Elder and Barbara Brengebier. He began his career as a painter as an apprentice in his father's workshop, training alongside his older brother, Hans. Following the sudden death of Hans in 1537, Cranach the Younger would assume greater responsibilities in his father's workshop.

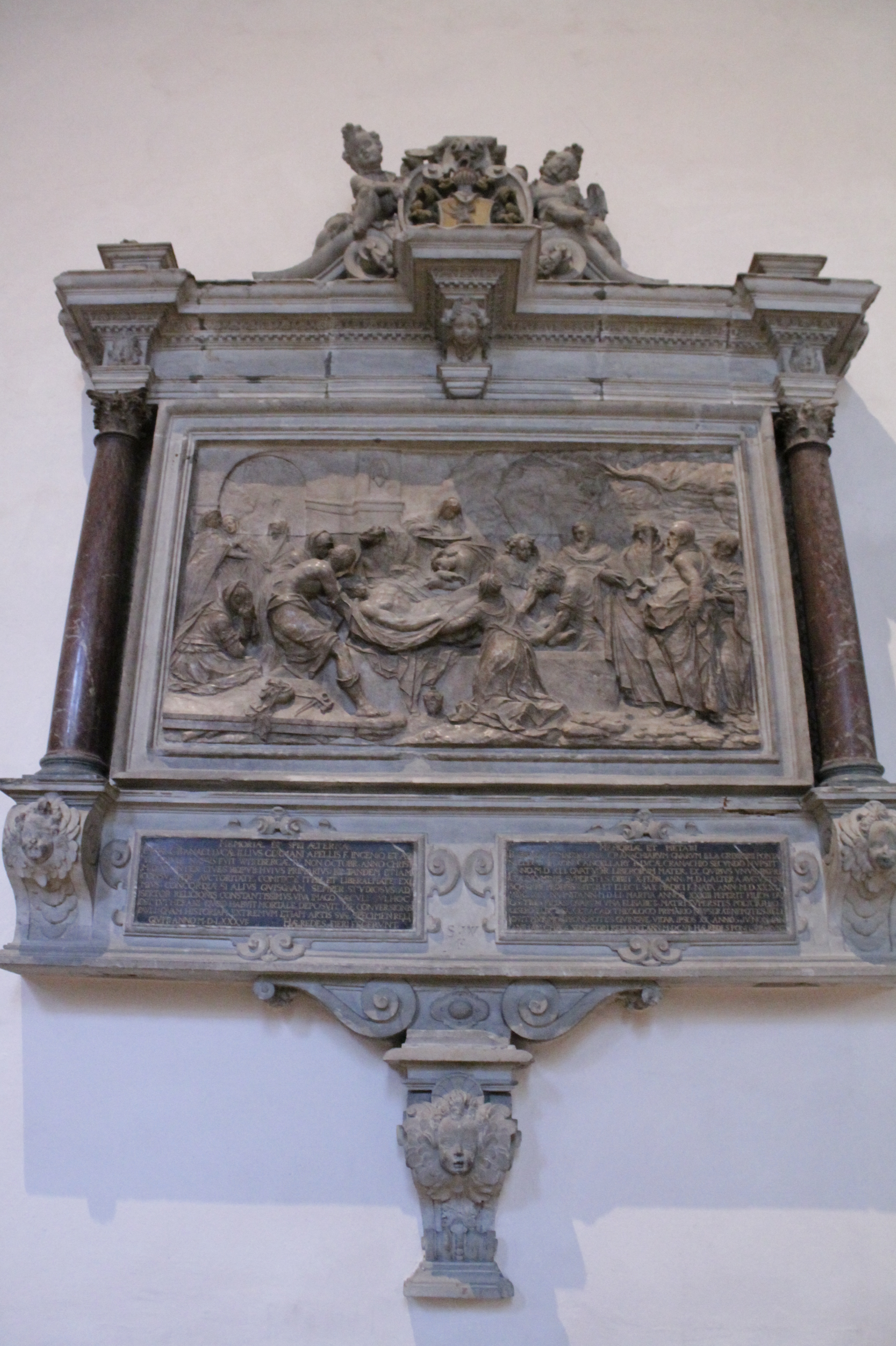
The grave of Lucas Cranach the Younger, Stadtkirche Wittenberg

The Protestant Reformation began in Wittenberg in 1517. Cranach the Elder was friends with Martin Luther and became known as a leading producer of Protestant artistic propaganda. In 1550, Cranach the Elder left Wittenberg to join his patron, John Frederick I, Elector of Saxony, in exile. Following his father's departure, Cranach the Younger assumed full responsibility over the flourishing family workshop. In this position, he successfully maintained the workshop's high output of quality work, including images of Reformers such as Luther himself. Although Cranach the Younger was never a court painter, he worked for members of the social elite, including princes and nobles. Upon his death in 1586, theologian Georg Mylius (1613–1640) stated that Cranach the Younger's work could be seen in "churches and schools, in castles and houses".

The Cranach family enjoyed a high status in Wittenberg. In addition to the painting workshop, Cranach the Younger was a successful businessman and politician. He occupied several political offices in Nuremberg commencing in 1549, when he served on the city council. He also served as Chamberlain, beginning in 1555 and Burgomaster from 1565.

On 20 February 1541, he married Barbara Brück (daughter of Gregor Brück, who was Luther's legal advisor and Cranach's neighbour in Wittenberg), with whom he had three sons and a daughter. He was also connected to the Brück family by his sister, Barbara Cranach, who married Christian Brück (brother of his wife). Barbara Cranach died of plague on 10 February 1550. Soon after, Cranach married Magdalena Schurff on 24 May 1551. This union produced five children, including painter Augustin Cranach. His daughter Elisabeth married Polykarp Leyser the Elder.

Cranach the Younger died in Wittenberg on 25 January 1586, at the age of 70. He is buried next to one of his finest altarpieces in the church of St Mary, also known as Stadtkirche Wittenberg.

== Works ==
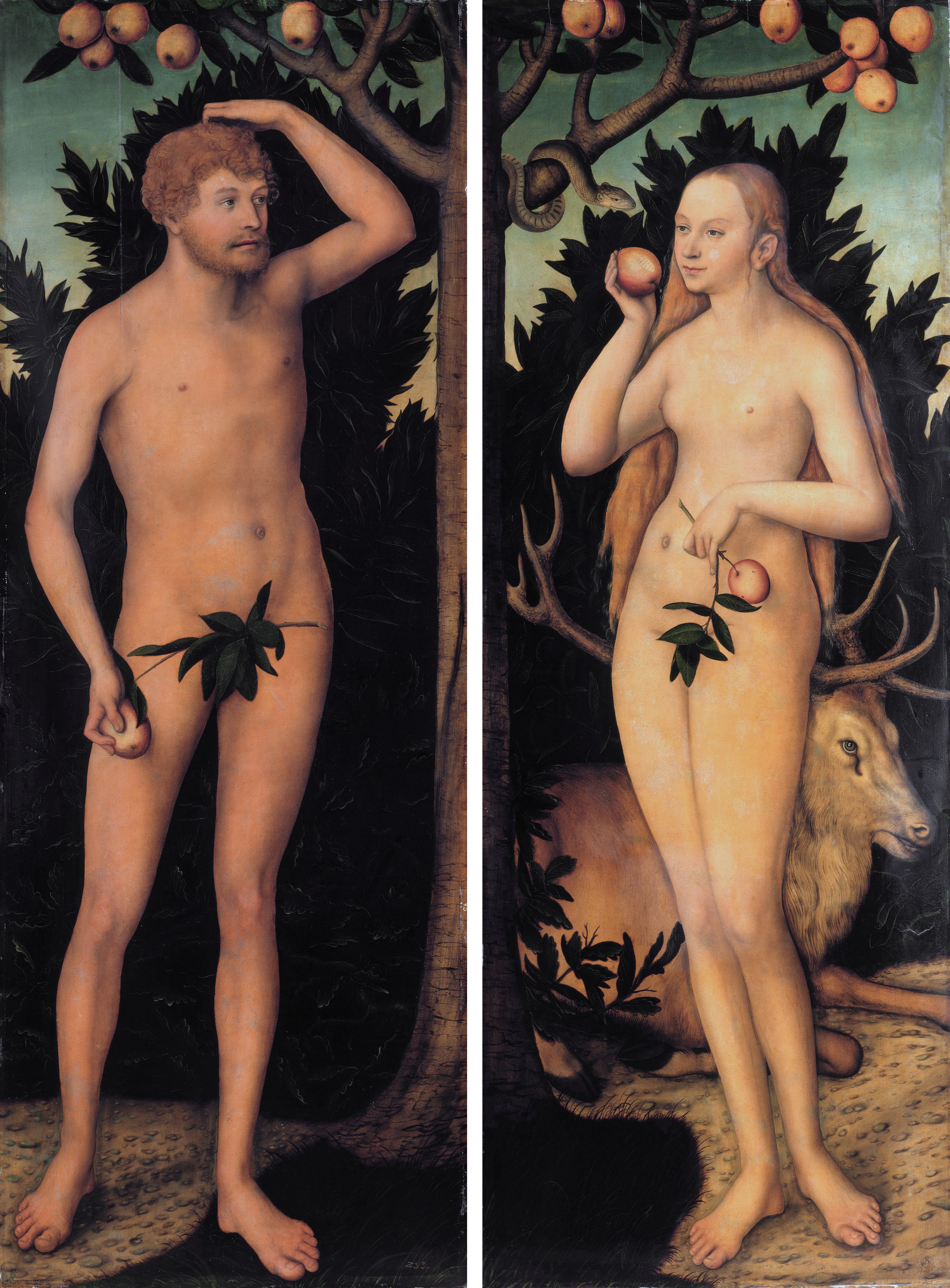
Adam and Eve

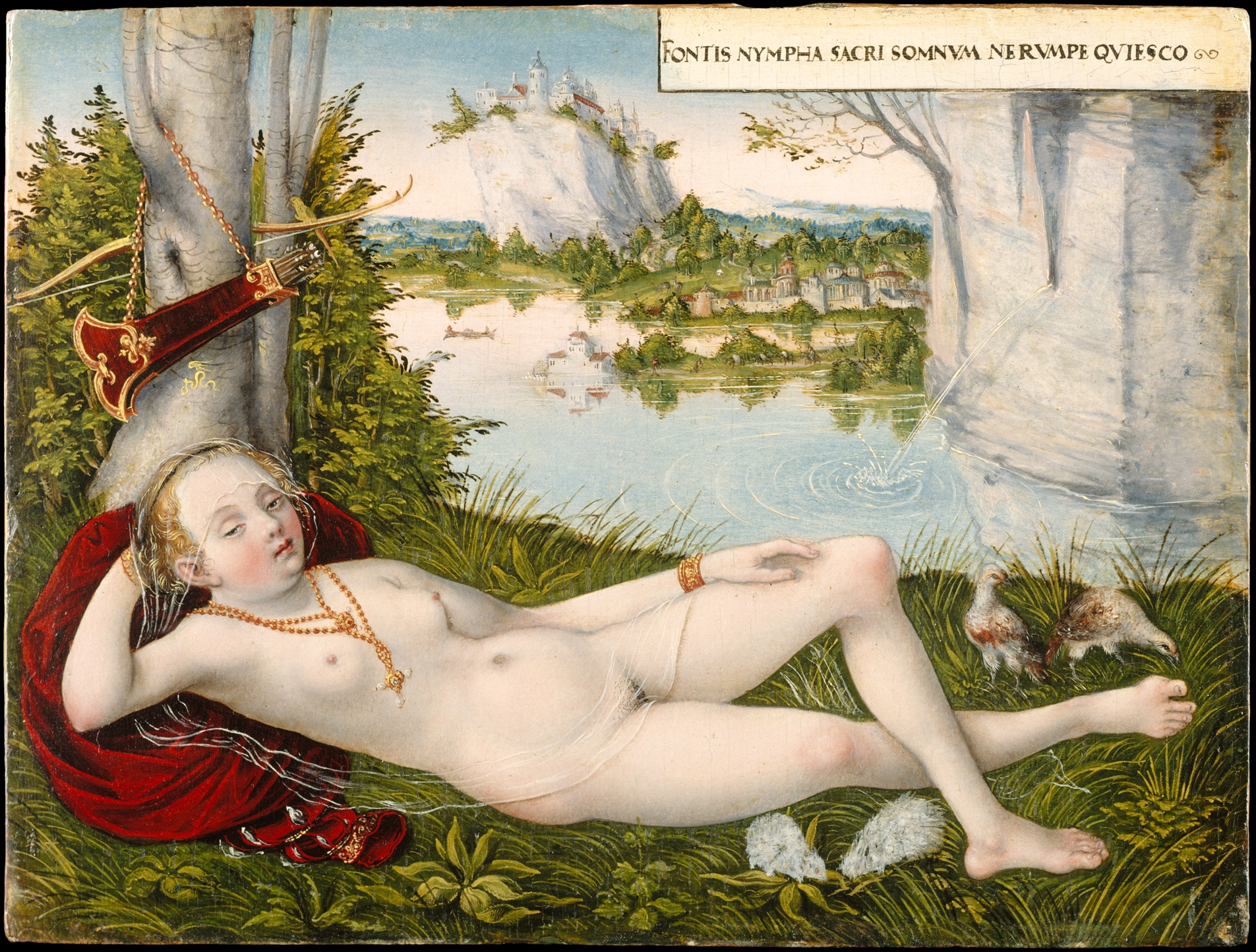
Nymph of the Spring (1545–1550)

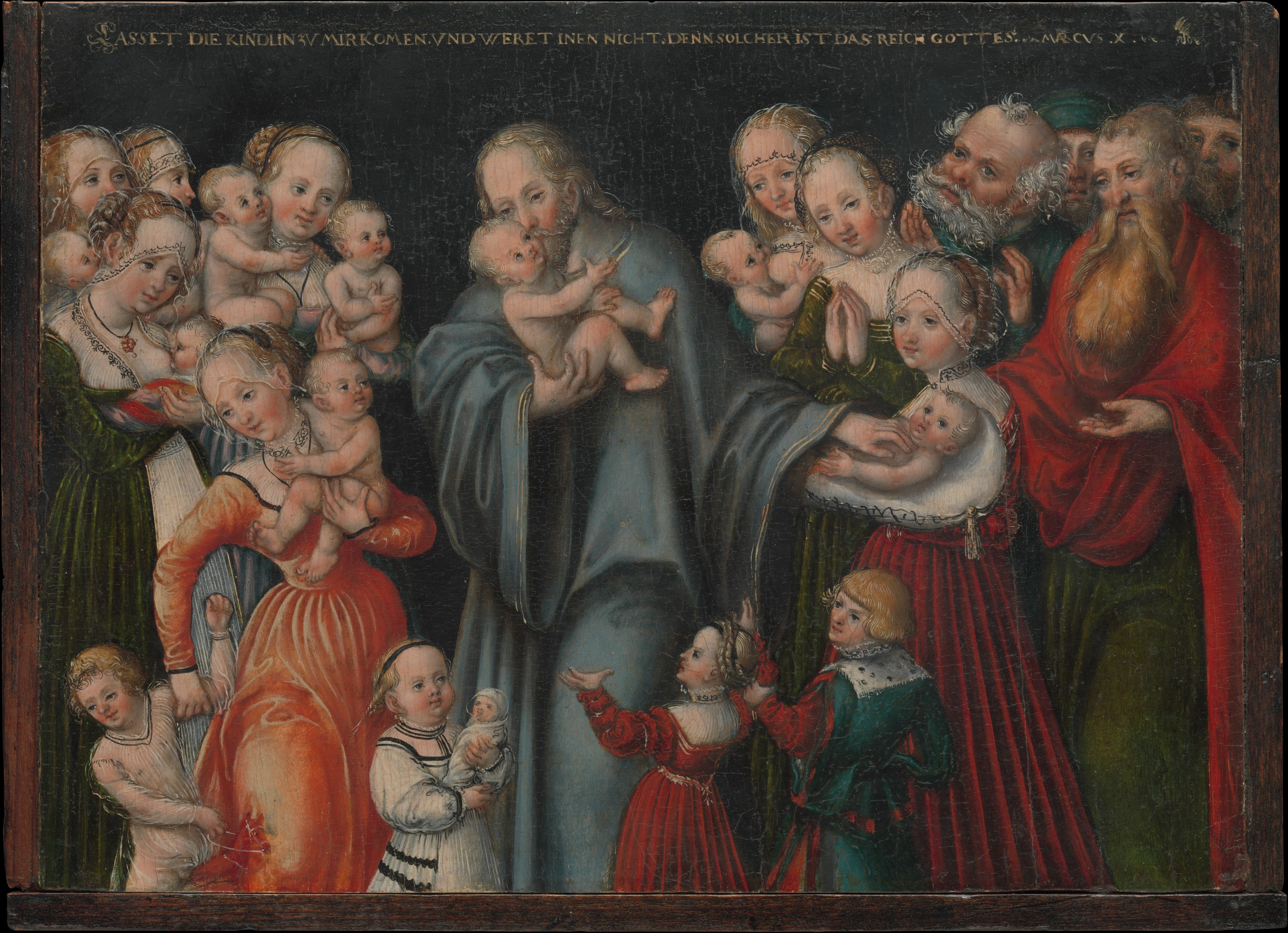
Christ blessing the children (1545–1550)

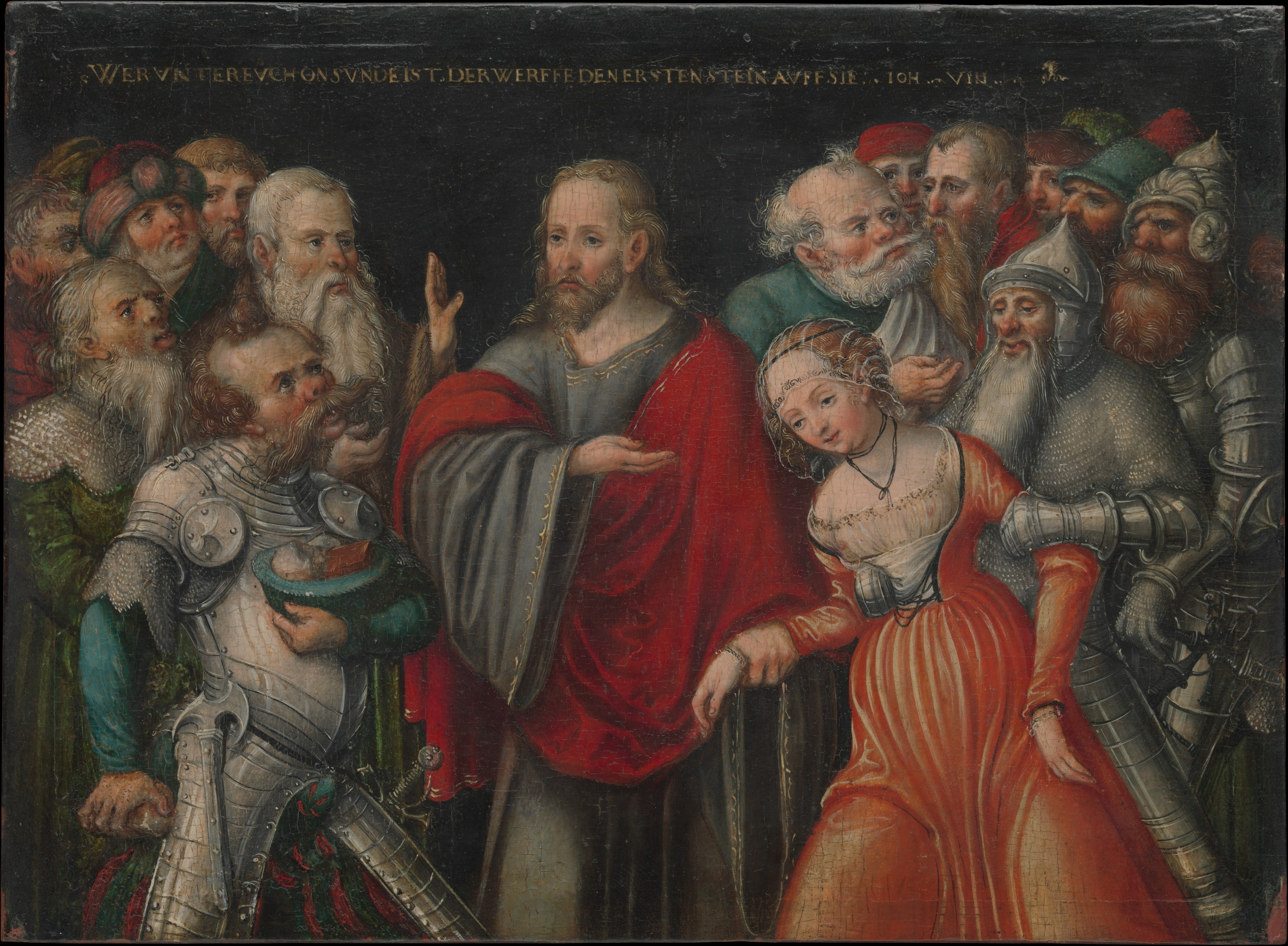
Christ and the adulteress (1545–1550)

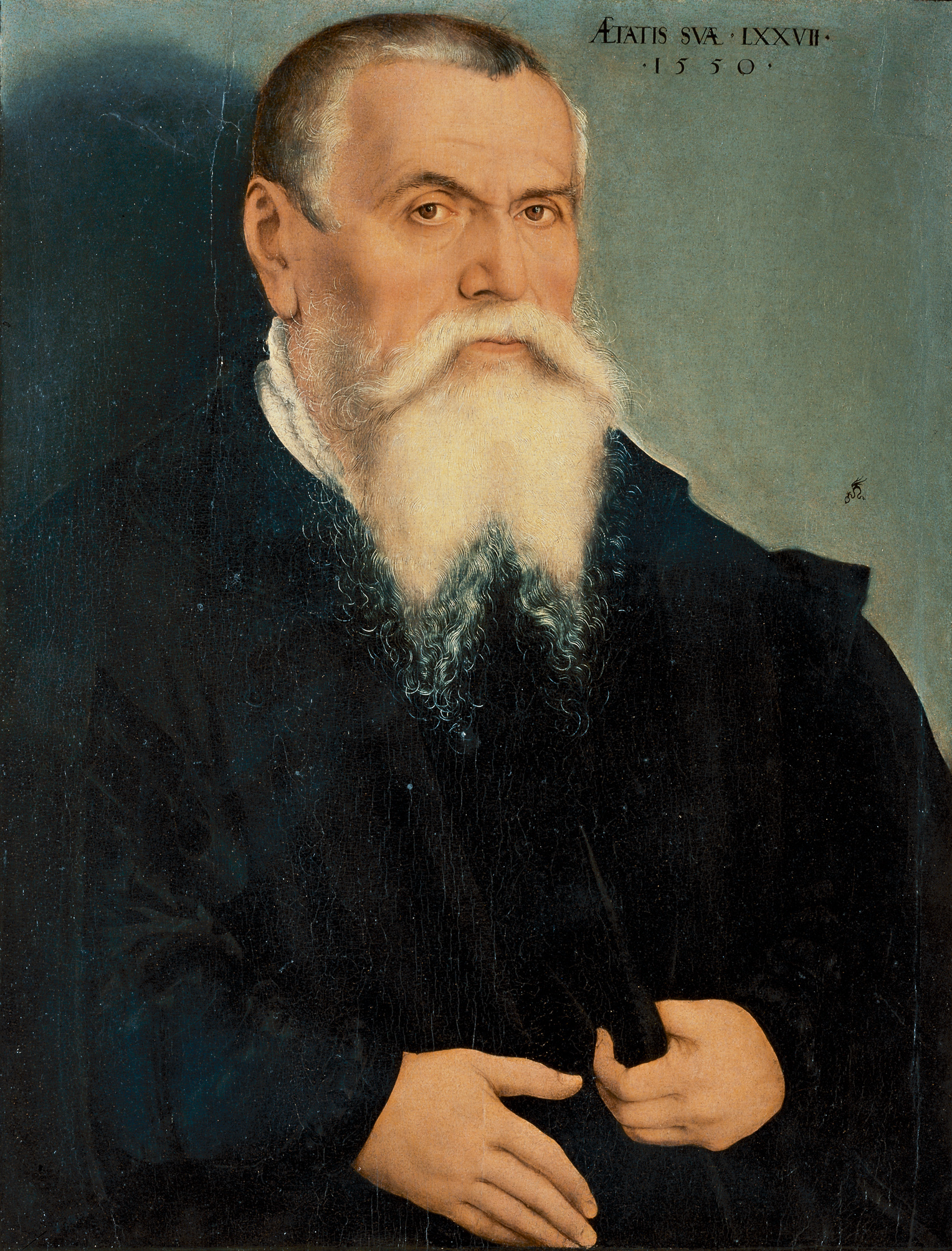
Portrait of Lucas Cranach the Elder (1550)

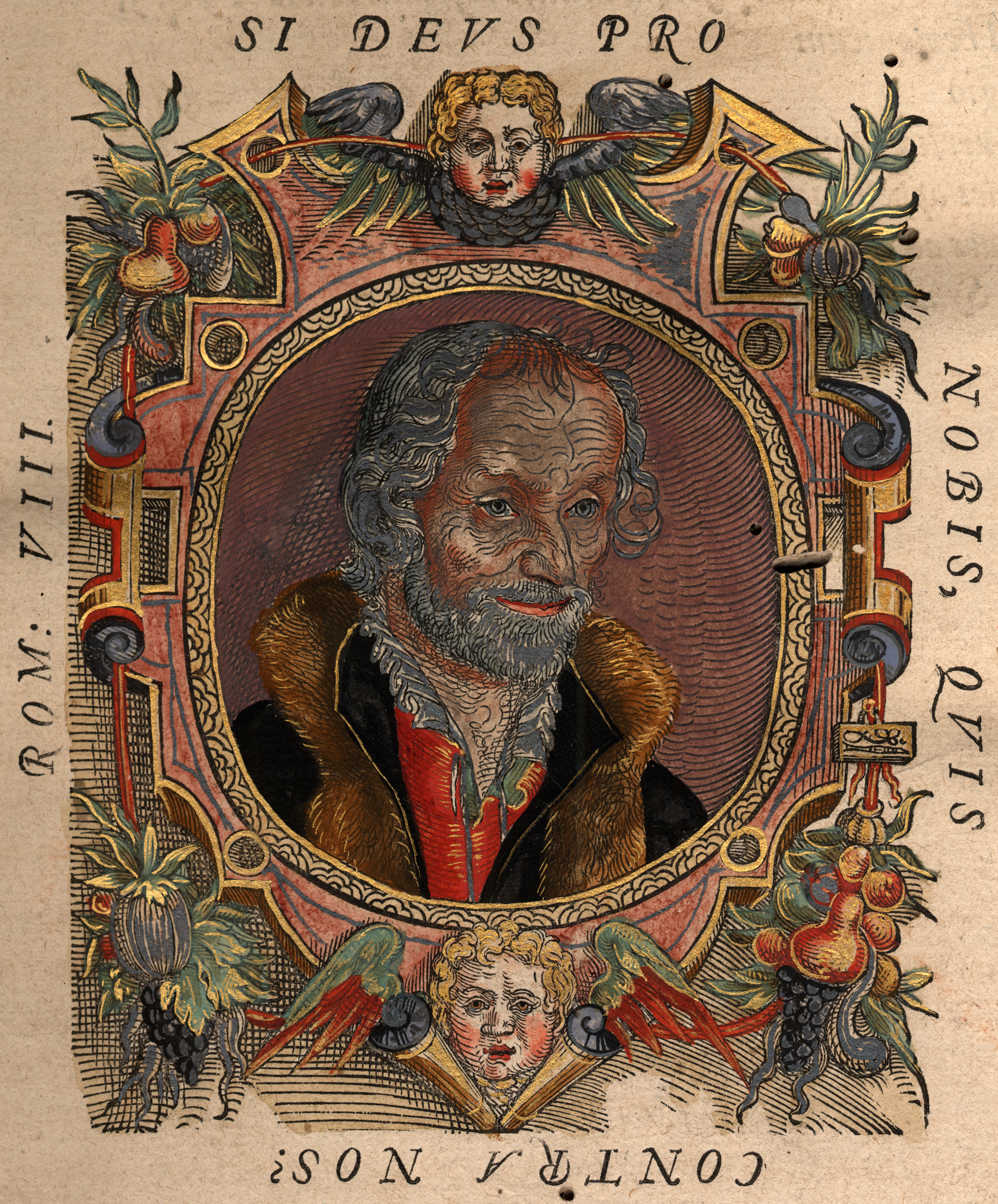
Portrait of Philipp Melanchthon (1562)

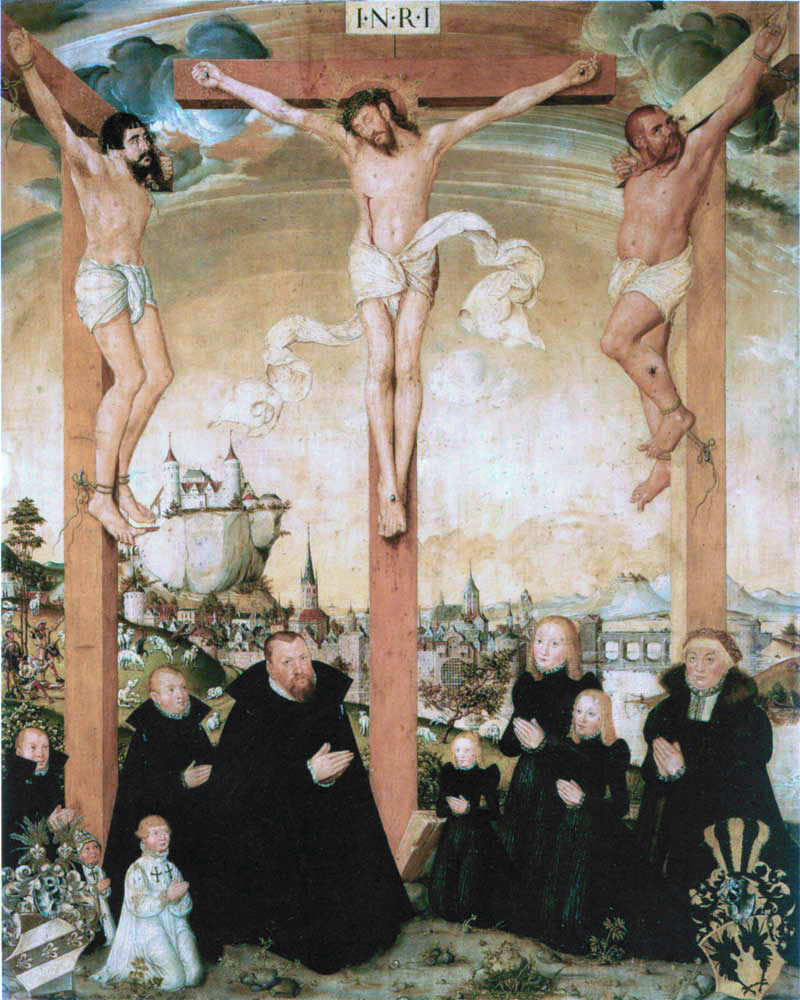
Portrait of Georg Cracow and family (1563)

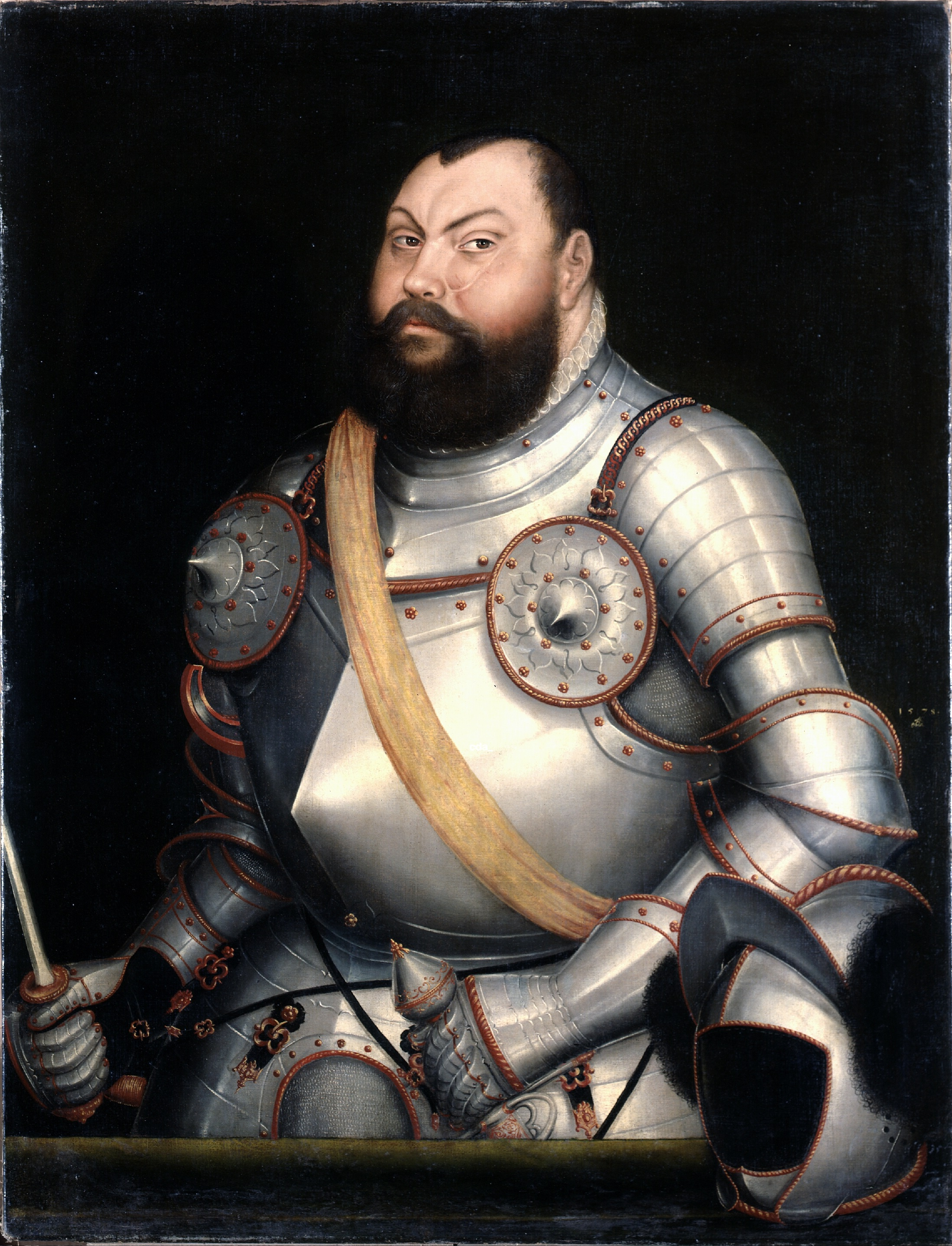
John Frederick I, Elector of Saxony (1578)

=== The Family of Sigismund I of Poland ===
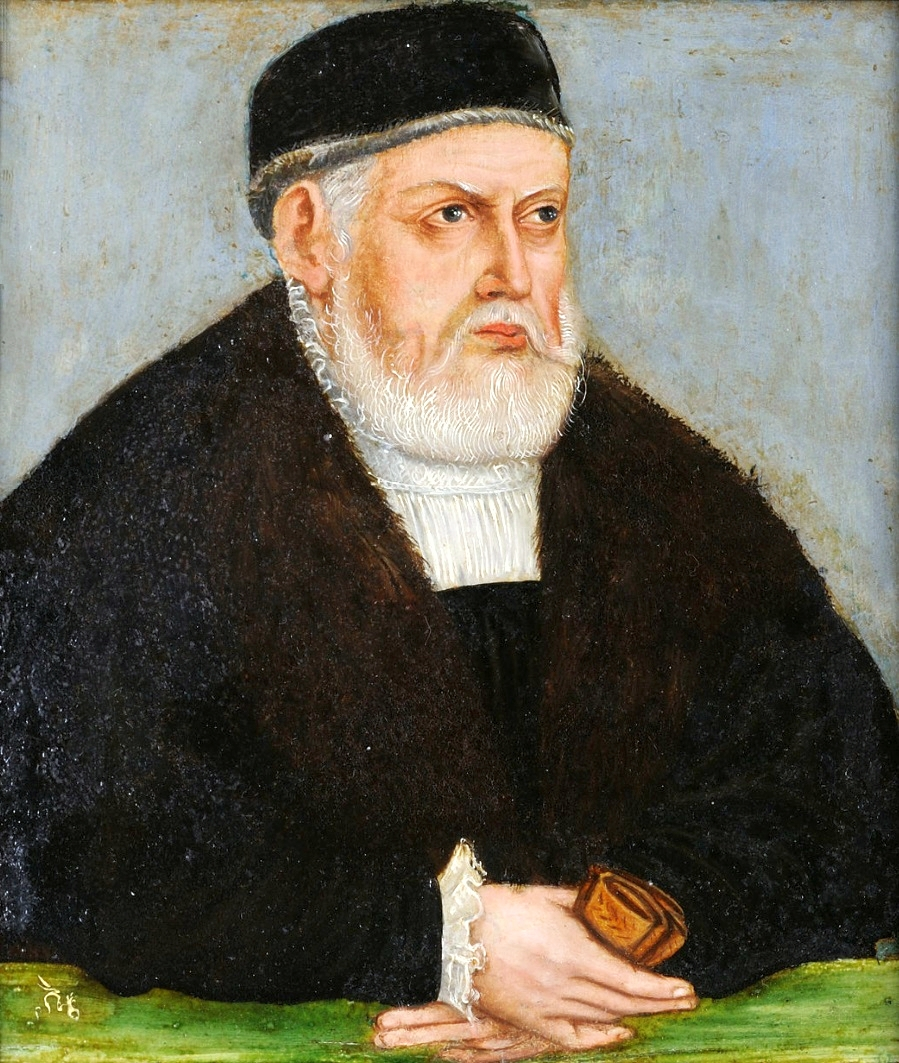
Sigismund I the Old (c. 1553)

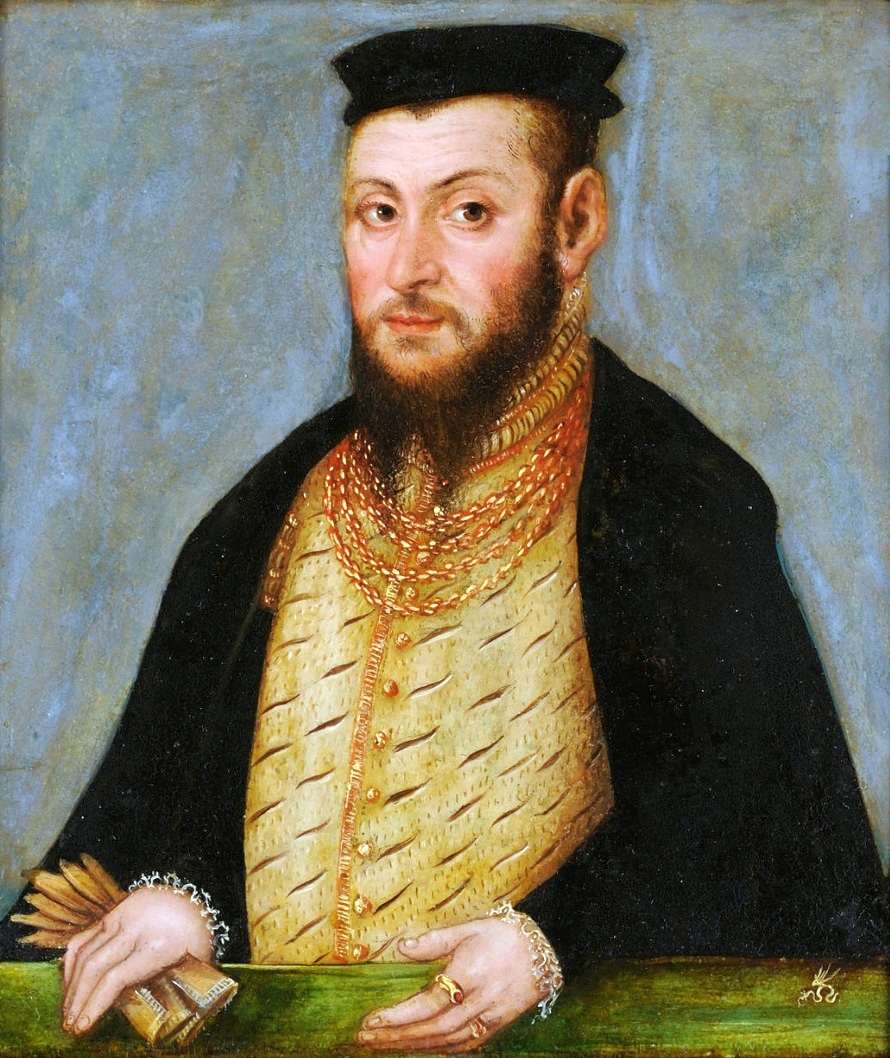
Sigismund II Augustus (1553)

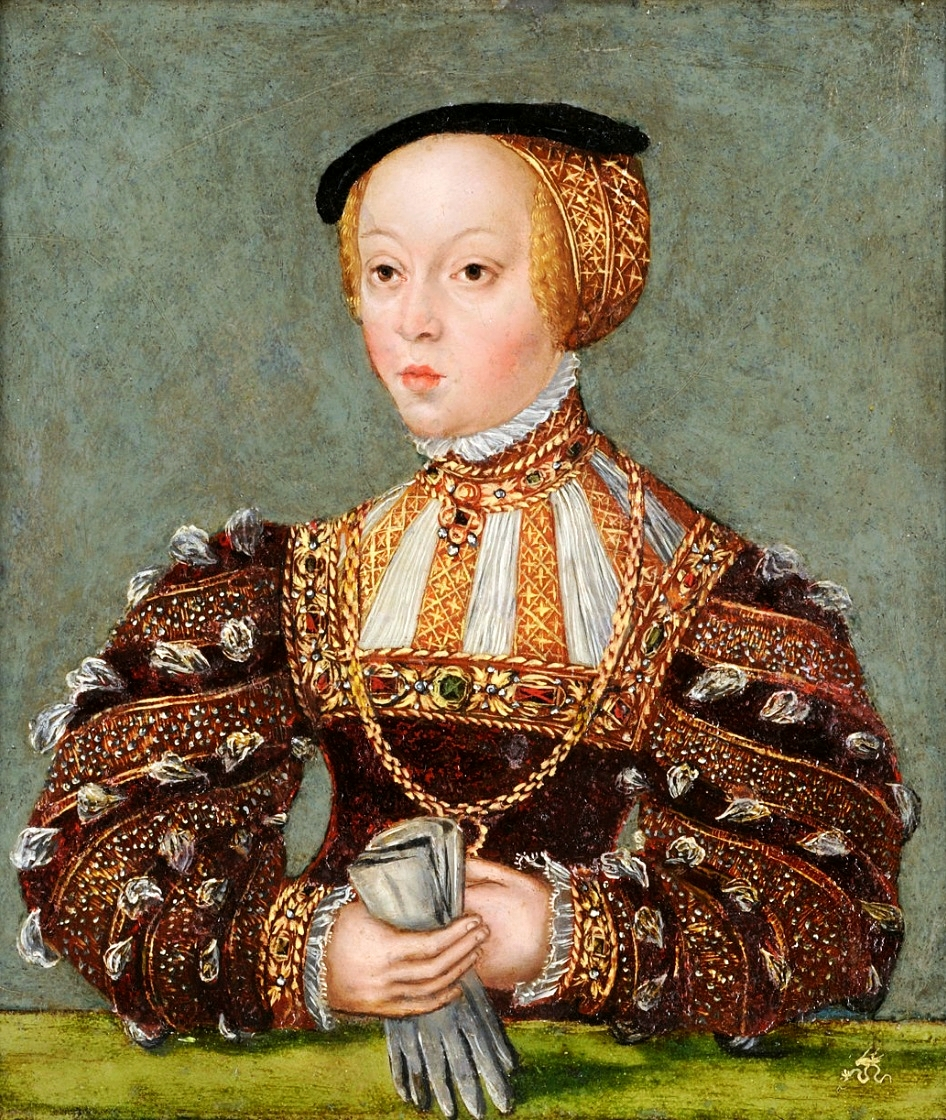
Elizabeth Habsburg, Queen of Poland

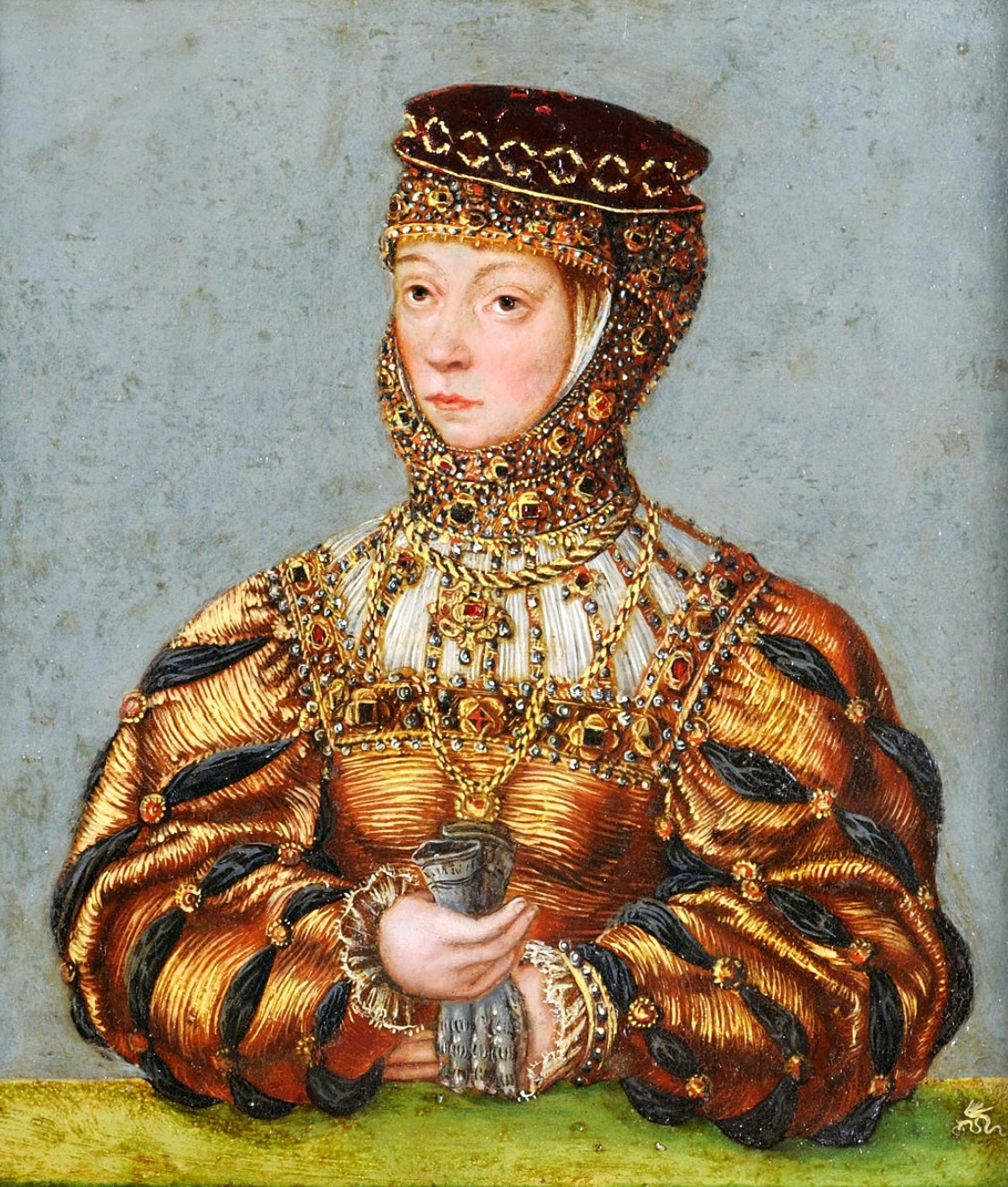
Portrait of Barbara Radziwiłł, Queen of Poland

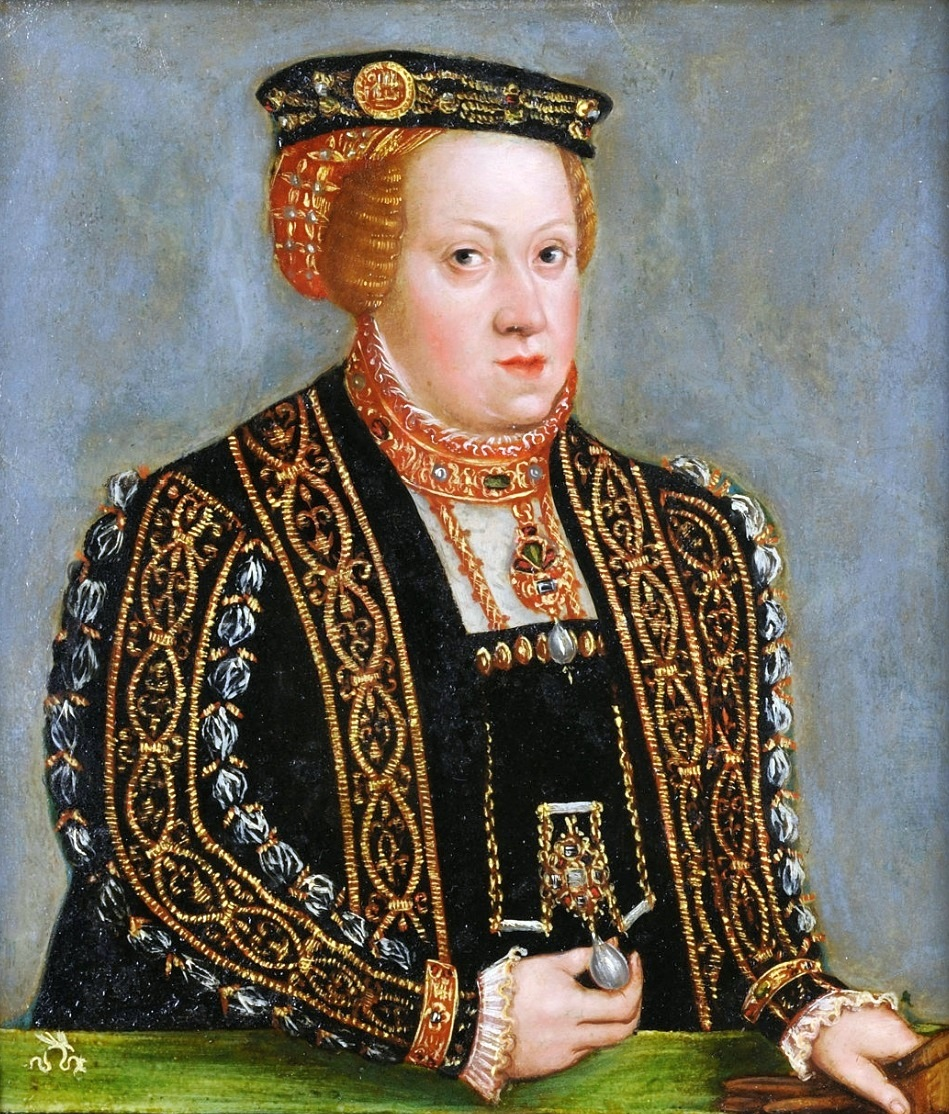
Portrait of Catherine of Austria, Queen of Poland
