= List of graphic artists in the Web Gallery of Art =

The List of graphic artists in the Web Gallery of Art is a list of the named artists in the Web Gallery of Art (WGA) whose works there comprise drawings, woodcuts, etchings, engravings, mezzotints, lithographs, and watercolours. The online collection contains roughly 34,000 images by 4,000 artists, but only named artists with works labelled "graphics" in the database are listed alphabetically here. The artist's name is followed by a title of one of their graphics works and its location, which is hosted on the WGA website. For artists with more than one work in the WGA collection, or for works by unnamed or unattributed artists, see the Web Gallery of Art website or the corresponding Wikimedia Commons category. Of the 645 graphic artists in the WGA database, there are only 7 women, namely Sofonisba Anguissola, Marie-Jeanne Renard du Bos, Isabella Parasole, Diana Scultori, Elisabetta Sirani, Élisabeth Louise Vigée Le Brun, and Teresa Berenice Vitelli. For the complete list of artists and their artworks in the WGA collection, the database can be downloaded as a compressed file from the website.

== A ==
- Nicolai Abildgaard (1743–1809), 1 engraving : Adam and Eve, Nationalmuseum, Stockholm (url)
- Lambert-Sigisbert Adam (1700–1759), 1 drawing : Self-portrait, Ashmolean Museum, Oxford (url)
- Willem van Aelst (1627–1683), 1 drawing : Still-Life with Armour, Fogg Art Museum, Harvard University, Cambridge (url)
- Ulisse Aldrovandi (1522–1605), 8 works : Red Hartebeest and Blackbuck, Biblioteca, University of Bologna, Bologna (url)
- Albrecht Altdorfer (1480–1538), 4 works : The Beautiful Virgin of Regensburg, National Gallery of Art, Washington (url)
- Bartolomeo Ammanati (1511–1592), 1 drawing : Architectural and anatomical sketches, Galleria degli Uffizi, Florence (url)
- Andrea del Sarto (1486–1530), 3 works : Study for the Baptism of the People, National Gallery of Victoria, Melbourne (url)
- Jacques Androuet du Cerceau the Elder (c. 1515 – 1584), 4 works : Château, Charleval, Bibliothèque Nationale, Paris (url)
- Pedro Ángel (1583–1617), 1 engraving : Jerónimo de Cevallos, Biblioteca Nacional, Madrid (url)
- Fra Angelico (1387–1455), 3 works : King David Playin a Psaltery, British Museum, London (url)
- Sofonisba Anguissola (1530–1635), 2 works : Asdrubale Bitten by a Crawfish, Museo Nazionale di Capodimonte, Naples (url)
- Cornelis Anthonisz. (1505–1552), 1 woodcut : Saint Crosspatch, Rijksmuseum, Amsterdam (url)
- Antonio da Trento (active c. 1527-after c. 1527), 1 woodcut : Nude Man in a Landscape, Kunsthalle, Bremen (url)
- Giuseppe Arcimboldo (1526–1593), 88 works : Nature studies, Österreichische Nationalbibliothek, Vienna (url)
- Pieter Jansz van Asch (1603–1678), 1 drawing : Landscape, Fogg Art Museum, Harvard University, Cambridge (url)
- Balthasar van der Ast (1593–1656), 3 works : Still-Life with Plums, Cherries, and Shells, British Museum, London (url)
- Diego de Astor (ca. 1587-ca. 1650), 2 works : St Francis and Brother Leo Meditating on Death, Biblioteca Nacional, Madrid (url)
- Claude Audran III (1658–1734), 2 works : Arabesque, Nationalmuseum, Stockholm (url)
- Jean Audran (1667–1756), 1 engraving : Winter, National Gallery of Art, Washington (url)
- John James Audubon (1785–1851), 1 watercolour : American Stork, National Audubon Society, New York (url)
- Antoine Aveline (1691–1743), 1 engraving : View and Perspective of the Ménagerie at Versailles, Musée National du Château, Versailles (url)
- Pierre-Alexandre Aveline (1702–1760), 1 etching : The Signboard of the Gersaint Gallery, The Hermitage, St. Petersburg (url)
- Hendrick Avercamp (1585–1634), 2 works : River Landscape, Royal Museums of Fine Arts of Belgium, Brussels (url)

== B ==
- Ludolf Bakhuizen (1631–1708), 1 drawing : View of Delft from the Schie, Historisch Museum, Amsterdam (url)
- David Bailly (1584–1657), 2 works : Self-Portrait, Rijksmuseum, Amsterdam (url)
- Jacques Bailly II (c. 1700 – 1768), 1 gouache : Bouquet of Flowers, Musée du Louvre, Paris (url)
- Baccio Baldini (1436–1487), 1 engraving : Inferno I, Biblioteca Riccardiana, Florence (url)
- Hans Baldung (1484–1545), 10 works : The Erection of the Cross, Staatliche Museen, Berlin (url)
- Baccio Bandinelli (1493–1560), 1 drawing : Andrea Doria as Neptune, British Museum, London (url)
- Jacopo de' Barbari (c. 1445 – 1516), 5 works : Cleopatra, British Museum, London (url)
- Federico Barocci (1530–1612), 4 works : Study of a Bent Right Arm, Musée du Louvre, Paris (url)
- Bernard Baron (1696–1762), 2 works : The Italian Comedians, National Gallery of Art, Washington (url)
- Fra Bartolomeo (1472–1517), 1 drawing : Worship of Venus, Galleria degli Uffizi, Florence (url)
- Francesco Bartolozzi (1727–1815), 2 works : Bacchante, The Hermitage, St. Petersburg (url)
- Antoine-Louis Barye (1796–1875), 1 watercolour : Two Jaguars from Peru, Musée du Louvre, Paris (url)
- Jacopo Bassano (1510–1592), 2 works : The Betrayal of Christ, Musée du Louvre, Paris (url)
- Nicolas Beatrizet (1507–1565), 2 works : The Archers, Graphische Sammlung Albertina, Vienna (url)
- Jacques Firmin Beauvarlet (1731–1797), 1 engraving : The Comtesse du Barry, Wildenstein Institute, Paris (url)
- Joos de Beer (1425–1593), 1 drawing : The Lamentation, Metropolitan Museum of Art, New York (url)
- Hans Sebald Beham (1500–1550), 2 works : The Prodigal Son Wasting His Patrimony, National Gallery of Art, Washington (url)
- Stefano della Bella (1610–1664), 1 etching : Marriage of Cosimo III and Margherita Luisa d'Orléans, Galleria degli Uffizi, Florence (url)
- Jacques Bellange (1594–1638), 3 works : The Three Marys at the Tomb, British Museum, London (url)
- Gentile Bellini (1430–1507), 1 drawing : Self-Portrait, Staatliche Museen, Berlin (url)
- Giovanni Bellini (1435–1516), 1 drawing : Man with a Turban, Galleria degli Uffizi, Florence (url)
- Jacopo Bellini (1400–1471), 5 works : The Twelve Apostles in a Barrel Vaulted Passage, British Museum, London (url)
- Bernardo Bellotto (1720–1780), 1 etching : Dresden, the Ruins of the Pirnaische Vorstadt, Private collection (url)
- Simon Bening (1483–1561), 1 drawing : Pentecost, Museum Boijmans Van Beuningen, Rotterdam (url)
- François-Léon Benouville (1821–1859), 1 drawing : Two Men Ascending a Stair, Michael C. Carlos Museum of Emory University, Atlanta (url)
- Nicolaes Pieterszoon Berchem (1620–1683), 1 drawing : A Standing Shepherd, Rijksmuseum, Amsterdam (url)
- Balthasar Florisz. van Berckenrode (1591–1645), 1 engraving : Bird's-Eye View of Honselaarsdijk (detail), House of Orange-Nassau Historic Collection Trust, The Hague (url)
- Gerrit Adriaenszoon Berckheyde (1638–1698), 3 works : The Bend in the Herengracht, City Archives, Amsterdam (url)
- Gian Lorenzo Bernini (1598–1680), 1 watercolour : Study for an Equestrian Statue of Louis XIV, Museo Civico, Bassano del Grappa (url)
- Johan van Beverwijck (1594–1647), 1 engraving : Tobacco Smoking, Universiteits-Bibliotheek, Amsterdam (url)
- Jacob Binck (1495–1560), 3 works : Christian II of Denmark, Metropolitan Museum of Art, New York (url)
- Bartolomeo Biscaino (1629–1657), 1 drawing : The Mystic Marriage of Saint Catherine, Los Angeles County Museum of Art, Los Angeles (url)
- Giuseppe Bernardino Bison (1762–1844), 1 gouache : View of the Arsenale, Venice, Private collection (url)
- Jan de Bisschop (1628–1670), 5 works : The Schiedam Gate at Delft, Historisch Museum, Amsterdam (url)
- William Blake (1757–1827), 17 works : Lear Grasping a Sword, Museum of Fine Arts, Boston (url)
- Abraham Bloemaert (1564–1651), 1 drawing : Warrior and Young Standard-Bearer, Museum Mayer van den Bergh, Antwerp (url)
- Hans Bol (1534–1593), 1 watercolour : Landscape with the Fall of Icarus, Museum Mayer van den Bergh, Antwerp (url)
- Niccolo Boldrini (ca. 1500-ca. 1570), 1 woodcut : Samson and Delilah, The Hermitage, St. Petersburg (url)
- Boetius à Bolswert (1570–1633), 1 engraving : The Judgment of Solomon, Metropolitan Museum of Art, New York (url)
- Schelte a Bolswert (1586–1659), 3 works : As the Old Sang, So Pipe the Young, Rijksmuseum, Amsterdam (url)
- Giovanni Antonio Boltraffio (1467–1516), 2 works : Study of Drapery, Staatliche Museen, Berlin (url)
- Giulio Bonasone (ca. 1510-after 1576), 1 engraving : Jupiter Suckled by the Goat Amalthea, Bibliothèque Nationale, Paris (url)
- Richard Parkes Bonington (1802–1828), 3 works : Rouen, Wallace Collection, London (url)
- Francesco Bonsignori (1455–1519), 1 drawing : Portrait of a Man, Graphische Sammlung Albertina, Vienna (url)
- Benedetto Bordone (c. 1460 – 1539), 2 works : Scene with Satyr and Sleeping Nymph, Metropolitan Museum of Art, New York (url)
- Paris Bordone (1500–1571), 1 drawing : Nude, Galleria degli Uffizi, Florence (url)
- Vladimir Borovikovsky (1757–1825), 1 drawing : Apostle Peter, State Tretyakov Gallery, Moscow (url)
- Cornelis Bos (1506–1574), 3 works : Female herm, Rijksmuseum, Amsterdam (url)
- Hieronymus Bosch (1450–1516), 28 works : Group of Male Figures, The Morgan Library and Museum, New York (url)
- Antonio Bosio (1575–1629), 1 engraving : Wall-painting fragment, Biblioteca Apostolica, Vatican (url)
- Abraham Bosse (1602–1676), 4 works : Musical Society, Bibliothèque Nationale, Paris (url)
- Andries Both (1612–1642), 1 engraving : The Poor Painter in His Studio, Rijksmuseum, Amsterdam (url)
- Sandro Botticelli (1444–1510), 12 works : Study of two standing figures, Musée des Beaux-Arts, Lille (url)
- Edmé Bouchardon (1698–1762), 1 drawing : Study for the Equestrian Statue of Louis XV, Musée du Louvre, Paris (url)
- François Boucher (1703–1770), 3 works : Music, Private collection (url)
- Dieric Bouts (1415–1475), 1 drawing : Portrait of a Man, Smith College Museum of Art, Northampton (url)
- Claudine Bouzonnet-Stella (1636–1697), 2 works : Holy Family on the Steps, Metropolitan Museum of Art, New York (url)
- Thomas Shotter Boys (1803–1874), 2 works : Piccadilly Circus, Bibliothèque Nationale, Paris (url)
- René Boyvin (ca. 1525-ca. 1625), 2 works : Masked Head, Graphische Sammlung Albertina, Vienna (url)
- Ambrogio Brambilla (1579–1599), 3 works : Caricatures of the Gods of Olympus, Galleria degli Uffizi, Florence (url)
- Leonaert Bramer (1596–1674), 21 works : The Curious Ones, Museum Kunstpalast, Düsseldorf (url)
- Sebastian Brant (1457–1521), 2 works : Title Page of Ship of Fools, - (url)
- Dirck de Bray (1635–1694), 1 woodcut : Portrait of Salomon de Bray, - (url)
- Jan de Bray (1627–1697), 8 works : Haarlem Printer Abraham Casteleyn and His Wife Margarieta van Bancken, Fondation Custodia, Paris (url)
- Joseph de Bray (1630–1664), 1 drawing : Joseph Receiving His Father and Brothers in Egypt, Royal Museums of Fine Arts of Belgium, Brussels (url)
- Salomon de Bray (1597–1664), 6 works : Eliezer and Rebecca, Staatliche Graphische Sammlung, Munich (url)
- Gillis van Breen I (1560–1602), 2 works : Inn Scene with Prostitutes, Prentenkabinet, Universiteit, Leiden (url)
- Bartholomeus Breenbergh (1598–1657), 1 drawing : Ruins of the City Walls, near Porta S Paolo, Rome, Christ Church Picture Gallery, Oxford (url)
- Paul Bril (1554–1626), 1 drawing : A Forest Pool, Royal Museums of Fine Arts of Belgium, Brussels (url)
- Giovanni Britto (1530–1550), 2 works : Francesco Priscianese, British Museum, London (url)
- Albertus Brondgeest (1786–1849), 1 drawing : Girl Standing by a Fence, Rijksmuseum, Amsterdam (url)
- Bronzino (1503–1572), 2 works : Study of a Young Man with a Lute, Devonshire Collection, Chatsworth (url)
- Pieter Bruegel the Elder (1526–1569), 17 works : The Ass in the School, Staatliche Museen, Berlin (url)
- Jan Brueghel the Elder (1568–1624), 1 drawing : Villagers on their Way to Market, Royal Museums of Fine Arts of Belgium, Brussels (url)
- Nicolaes de Bruyn (1571–1656), 2 works : The Golden Age, Metropolitan Museum of Art, New York (url)
- Aleksandr Pavlovich Bryullov (1798–1877), 1 lithograph : Sennaya Square, The Hermitage, St. Petersburg (url)
- Hans Burgkmair (1473–1540), 4 works : Gypsies in the Market, Nationalmuseum, Stockholm (url)
- Edward Burne-Jones (1833–1898), 1 watercolour : Garden of the Hesperides, Kunsthalle, Hamburg (url)
- Friedrich Bury (1761–1823), 2 works : Johann Wolfgang von Goethe, Stiftung Weimarer Klassik, Museen, Weimar (url)
- Willem Pieterszoon Buytewech (1591–1624), 1 etching : Road along a Wood, British Museum, London (url)

== C ==
- Jacques Callot (1592–1635), 11 works : The Two Pantaloons, British Museum, London (url)
- Luca Cambiasi (1527–1585), 1 drawing : Flight of Aeneas, Anchises and Ascanius from Troy, The Hermitage, St. Petersburg (url)
- Domenico Campagnola (1500–1564), 2 works : Mountainous Landscape with Antique Ruins, Szépmûvészeti Múzeum, Budapest (url)
- Jacob van Campen (1595–1657), 1 drawing : Design for an interior, Rijksprentenkabinet, Amsterdam (url)
- Antonio Campi (1523–1587), 2 works : Studies of an Old Woman's Face and a Leg, Galleria degli Uffizi, Florence (url)
- Vincenzo Campi (c. 1530 – 1591), 3 works : Two Studies of Bulls, Galleria degli Uffizi, Florence (url)
- Canaletto (1697–1768), 20 works : The Piazzetta to the South, Royal Collection, Windsor (url)
- Antonio Canova (1757–1822), 1 drawing : The Three Graces Dancing, Canova Museum, Possagno (url)
- Luca Carlevarijs (1663–1730), 4 works : The Rialto Bridge, Rijksmuseum, Amsterdam (url)
- Fra Carnevale (c. 1425 – 1484), 3 works : A Woman and a Kneeling Monk, Galleria degli Uffizi, Florence (url)
- Vittore Carpaccio (1465–1527), 3 works : The Dream of St Ursula, Galleria degli Uffizi, Florence (url)
- Agostino Carracci (1557–1602), 5 works : Head of a Faun in a Concave (roundel), National Gallery of Art, Washington (url)
- Annibale Carracci (1560–1609), 3 works : Sheet of caricatures, British Museum, London (url)
- Laurent Cars (1699–1771), 3 works : Danzatori dell'opera, Museo Civico, Vicenza (url)
- Asmus Jakob Carstens (1754–1798), 1 drawing : Self-Portrait, Kunsthalle, Hamburg (url)
- Nicolò della Casa (1543–1548), 2 works : Cosimo I de' Medici in Parade Armour, Museum of Art, Philadelphia (url)
- Jacob Cats (painter) (1741–1799), 1 watercolour : Autumn Landscape with Rainbow, Rijksmuseum, Amsterdam (url)
- Jacques Cellier (c. 1550 – 1620), 1 drawing : The Hôtel de Ville in Paris, Bibliothèque Nationale, Paris (url)
- Benvenuto Cellini (1500–1571), 7 works : Cope pin (profile), British Museum, London (url)
- Cesare da Sesto (1477–1523), 4 works : Seated Bull, Royal Collection, Windsor (url)
- Giuseppe Cesari (1568–1640), 1 drawing : The Calling of St Matthew, Graphische Sammlung Albertina, Vienna (url)
- Paul Cézanne (1839–1906), 9 works : Mont Sainte-Victoire Seen from Les Lauves, Museum of Art, Philadelphia (url)
- Nicolas Toussaint Charlet (1792–1845), 1 lithograph : Death of the Cavalryman, Bibliothèque Nationale, Paris (url)
- Théodore Chassériau (1819–1856), 1 watercolour : Sappho Leaping into the Sea from the Leucadian Promontory, Musée du Louvre, Paris (url)
- Claude Chastillon (c. 1560 – 1616), 2 works : The Chapel of Notre-Dame de Lisieux, Bibliothèque Nationale, Paris (url)
- François Chauveau (1613–1676), 1 engraving : Frontispiece to 'Cabinet de M. de Scudéry', Bibliothèque Nationale, Paris (url)
- Daniel Chodowiecki (1726–1801), 5 works : Cardplayers at a Large Table, The Hermitage, St. Petersburg (url)
- Petrus Christus (1415–1476), 1 drawing : Portrait of a Man with a Falcon, Städelsches Kunstinstitut, Frankfurt (url)
- Claude Lorrain (1604–1682), 8 works : Landscape with a Goatherd, British Museum, London (url)
- François Clouet (c. 1510 – 1572), 1 drawing : Portrait of Charles IX, The Hermitage, St. Petersburg (url)
- Jean Clouet (1480–1541), 5 works : Portrait of Jean de Dinteville, Seigneur de Polisy, Musée Condé, Chantilly (url)
- Giulio Clovio (1498–1578), 6 works : The Rape of Ganymede, Royal Collection, Windsor (url)
- Charles-Nicolas Cochin the Elder (1688–1754), 2 works : The Dress Ball Given in Honour of the Dauphin's Wedding, Bibliothèque Nationale, Paris (url)
- Charles-Nicolas Cochin (1715–1790), 4 works : Funeral Pomp of the Dauphine, Marie-Thérèse of Spain, Bibliothèque Nationale, Paris (url)
- Hieronymus Cock (1518–1570), 2 works : Ancient Sculpture Displayed in a Courtyard, Rijksmuseum, Amsterdam (url)
- Pieter Coecke van Aelst (1502–1550), 1 woodcut : Turkish Sultan before the Hippodrome (detail), Rijksmuseum, Amsterdam (url)
- Jacobus Coelemans (1654–1732), 1 engraving : Paolo Veronese, Kupferstichkabinett, Dresden (url)
- Gillis van Coninxloo (1544–1606), 1 watercolour : Mountain Landscape with River Valley and the Prophet Hosea, Museum Mayer van den Bergh, Antwerp (url)
- John Constable (1776–1837), 2 works : Stonehenge, Victoria and Albert Museum, London (url)
- George Cooke (1781–1834), 2 works : Dover from Shakespeare Cliff, Museum of Fine Arts, Boston (url)
- Dirck Volckertszoon Coornhert (1522–1590), 2 works : The Crucifixion of Christ, Rijksmuseum, Amsterdam (url)
- Cristoforo Coriolano (1540-ca. 1600), 1 woodcut : Donatello, British Museum, London (url)
- Jacob Cornelisz van Oostsanen (1472–1533), 1 woodcut : Christ Taking Leave of His Mother, Rijksmuseum, Amsterdam (url)
- Peter Cornelius (1783–1867), 2 works : The Vision of the Rabenstein, Städelsches Kunstinstitut, Frankfurt (url)
- Cornelis Cort (1533–1578), 5 works : The Trinity in Glory, British Museum, London (url)
- Gustave Courbet (1819–1877), 5 works : Artist at His Easel, Fogg Art Museum, Harvard University, Cambridge (url)
- Jean-Baptiste Courtonne (c. 1712 – 1781), 1 drawing : Drawings, L'Institut national d'histoire de l'art, Paris (url)
- Jean Cousin the Elder (1490–1570), 1 drawing : Vessel, École nationale supérieure des Beaux-Arts, Paris (url)
- Christiaen van Couwenbergh (1604–1667), 1 drawing : Diana, Fogg Art Museum, Harvard University, Cambridge (url)
- David Cox (artist) (1783–1859), 1 watercolour : The Night Train, City Art Gallery, Birmingham (url)
- Frans Crabbe van Espleghem (1480–1552), 2 works : Virgin and Child in a Landscape, Staatliche Museen, Berlin (url)
- Hans Cranach (1513–1537), 7 works : Travel sketchbook, Niedersächsisches Landesmuseum, Hannover (url)
- Lucas Cranach the Elder (1472–1553), 41 works : The Bad Thief on the Cross, Staatliche Museen, Berlin (url)
- Lucas Cranach the Younger (1515–1586), 4 works : Luther Preaching with the Pope in the Jaws of Hell, Staatliche Kunstsammlungen, Dresden (url)
- Giovanni Battista Crespi (1565–1632), 1 drawing : St Carlo Borromeo, Metropolitan Museum of Art, New York (url)
- George Cruikshank (1792–1878), 2 works : Egypt, a General View, Bibliothèque Nationale, Paris (url)
- Nicolaas Kruik (1678–1754), 2 works : Map of Delfland, Rijksmuseum, Amsterdam (url)
- Aelbert Cuyp (1620–1691), 1 drawing : View of Arnhem, Rijksmuseum, Amsterdam (url)

== D ==
- Cornelis van Dalen I (1602–1665), 1 engraving : Allegory of the Birth of Prince Wilheim Heinrich von Brandenburg, - (url)
- Cornelis Danckerts de Ry (1561–1634), 1 engraving : Two Children with a Cat, Rijksmuseum, Amsterdam (url)
- Michel-François Dandré-Bardon (1700–1783), 3 works : Salon Scene, Musée du Louvre, Paris (url)
- Daniele da Volterra (1509–1566), 4 works : Portrait of Michelangelo, Teylers Museum, Haarlem (url)
- Jean-Pierre Dantan (1800–1869), 1 lithograph : Portrait of Tamburini, - (url)
- Jean Daullé (1703–1763), 1 engraving : Portrait of Anastasia Ioannovna, Landgravine of Hesse-Homburg, The Hermitage, St. Petersburg (url)
- Honoré Daumier (1808–1879), 3 works : Intermission at the Comédie Française, The Hermitage, St. Petersburg (url)
- Léon Davent (1540–1556), 1 etching : Tarquin and Lucretia, Musée du Louvre, Paris (url)
- Gerard David (1460–1523), 1 drawing : Study of Four Heads, National Gallery of Canada, Ottawa (url)
- Jacques-Louis David (1748–1825), 24 works : Sorrow, École nationale supérieure des Beaux-Arts, Paris (url)
- Jérôme David (ca. 1605-c. 1670), 1 engraving : Artemisia Gentileschi, Bibliothèque Nationale, Paris (url)
- Coenraet Decker (1650–1685), 12 works : Map and Profile of Delft, Gemeente Musea, Delft (url)
- Edgar Degas (1834–1917), 21 works : Portrait of Giulia Bellelli, Musée du Louvre, Paris (url)
- Eugène Delacroix (1798–1863), 28 works : Horse Frightened by a Storm, Szépmûvészeti Múzeum, Budapest (url)
- Willem Jacobsz Delff (1580–1638), 9 works : Portrait of Prince Maurits, Rijksmuseum, Amsterdam (url)
- Johann Adam Delsenbach (1687–1765), 2 works : View of a Garden Pavilion, Liechtenstein Museum, Vienna (url)
- Marco Dente (1486–1527), 2 works : Madonna of the Fish, British Museum, London (url)
- Charles-Melchior Descourtis (1753–1820), 1 coloured aquatint : Lover Surprised, The Hermitage, St. Petersburg (url)
- Louis Desplaces (1682–1739), 1 engraving : Spring, National Gallery of Art, Washington (url)
- Achille Devéria (1800–1857), 1 lithograph : Eleven p.m., Musée Carnavalet, Paris (url)
- Joannes Doetecum (1559–1608), 3 works : Kermis of St George, Rijksmuseum, Amsterdam (url)
- Domenichino (1581–1641), 1 drawing : Virginio Cesarini, Location unknown (url)
- Gustave Doré (1832–1883), 3 works : Illustration to the Bible, Various collections (url)
- Michel Dorigny (1617–1663), 3 works : Adoration of the Magi, Bibliothèque Nationale, Paris (url)
- Giovanni Antonio Dosio (1533-ca. 1609), 1 drawing : Belvedere Courtyard in the Vatican Palace, Biblioteca Apostolica, Vatican (url)
- John Downman (1750–1824), 3 works : Benjamin West, Private collection (url)
- Pierre Drevet (1663–1738), 1 engraving : Portrait of Louis Hector, Duc de Villars, Marshal of France, The Hermitage, St. Petersburg (url)
- Willem Drost (1633–1659), 1 etching : Self-Portrait, Rijksmuseum, Amsterdam (url)
- Marie-Jeanne Renard du Bos (1701-before 1750), 1 engraving : Summer, National Gallery of Art, Washington (url)
- Gaspard Duché de Vancy (1756–1788), 3 works : Costumes of the inhabitants of Port des Francais in Lituya Bay, British Museum, London (url)
- Daniel Dumonstier (1574–1645), 1 drawing : Portrait of a Man, École nationale supérieure des Beaux-Arts, Paris (url)
- Etienne Dupérac (c. 1525 – 1601), 3 works : Project for St Peter's in Rome, Graphische Sammlung Albertina, Vienna (url)
- Nicolas-Gabriel Dupuis (c. 1698 – 1771), 1 engraving : Equestrian Statue of Louis XV at Bordeaux, Bibliothèque Nationale, Paris (url)
- Louis Jean-Jacques Durameau (1733–1796), 1 drawing : Presumed Portrait of Joseph Pellerin, Institut Néerlandais, Paris (url)
- Albrecht Dürer (1471–1528), 347 works : Battle of the Sea Gods, Graphische Sammlung Albertina, Vienna (url)
- Cornelis Dusart (1660–1704), 1 drawing : Young Man with a Raised Glass, Royal Museums of Fine Arts of Belgium, Brussels (url)
- Jean Duvet (ca. 1485–after 1561), 2 works : Illustration to the Apocalypse, British Museum, London (url)
- Anthony van Dyck (1599–1641), 3 works : St. Mary's Church at Rye, England, Galleria degli Uffizi, Florence (url)

== E ==
- Richard Earlom (1743–1822), 1 etching : Flowers, The Hermitage, St. Petersburg (url)
- Gerbrand van den Eeckhout (1621–1674), 1 drawing : The City Walls of Delft with the Mill Called The Rose, Institut Néerlandais, Paris (url)
- Sigmund Elsässer (c1550-ca. 1587), 3 works : Kolowrat Wedding, Kunsthistorisches Museum, Vienna (url)
- Thomas Ender (1793–1875), 3 works : Povážský Hrad and the Renaissance Mansion, Library of the Hungarian Academy of Sciences, Budapest (url)
- Jan van Eyck (1370–1441), 1 drawing : Portrait of Cardinal Albergati, Kupferstichkabinett, Dresden (url)

== F ==
- Carel Fabritius (1622–1654), 1 drawing : Christ among the Doctors, Oskar Reinhart Collection, Winterthur (url)
- Sigismondo Fanti (active 1510-1530), 1 woodcut : Michelangelo Sculpting, Metropolitan Museum of Art, New York (url)
- Pieter Feddes van Harlingen (1586–1623), 1 drawing : Kitchen Scene, Museum Kunstpalast, Düsseldorf (url)
- Étienne Fessard (1714–1774), 4 works : Autumn, National Gallery of Art, Washington (url)
- Giovanni Ambrogio Figino (1548–1608), 2 works : Sleeping Nude Figure, Gallerie dell'Accademia, Venice (url)
- Filarete (1400–1465), 2 works : Page from the Trattato d'architettura, Galleria degli Uffizi, Florence (url)
- Pierre Filloeul (1696–c.1754), 3 works : Soap Bubbles, National Gallery of Art, Washington (url)
- Johann Bernhard Fischer Von Erlach (1656–1723), 5 works : Façade of a Garden Pavilion, Archivio civico, Milan (url)
- John Flaxman (1755–1826), 3 works : Inferno, Bibliothèque Nationale, Paris (url)
- Govert Flinck (1615–1660), 1 drawing : Isaac Blessing Jacob, Museum Boijmans Van Beuningen, Rotterdam (url)
- Peter Flötner (c. 1485 – 1546), 1 drawing : Design for a wall decoration, Staatliche Museen, Berlin (url)
- Karl Philipp Fohr (1795–1818), 1 drawing : Portrait of Heinrich Karl Hofmann, Staatsgalerie Stuttgart (url)
- Giovanni Battista Fontana (painter) (1524–1587), 2 works : Design for a Festival Entry (detail), Kunstbibliothek, Berlin (url)
- Lavinia Fontana (1552–1614), 1 drawing : Portrait of Antonietta Gonzalez, The Morgan Library and Museum, New York (url)
- Jan Baptist van Fornenburgh (1590–1648), 1 gouache : Flowers, Musée du Louvre, Paris (url)
- Alexandre-Évariste Fragonard (1780–1850), 1 watercolour : The Immured, Musée du Louvre, Paris (url)
- Jean-Honoré Fragonard (1732–1806), 4 works : Cypresses in the Garden Avenue of the Villa, Musée des Beaux-Arts et d'Archéologie, Besançon (url)
- Francesco di Giorgio (1439–1502), 6 works : Illustrations from the Trattato di architettura, Biblioteca Nazionale, Turin (url)
- Caspar David Friedrich (1774–1840), 13 works : Landscape with Pavilion, Kunsthalle, Hamburg (url)
- Ernst Fries (1801–1833), 1 watercolour : From the Park of the Villa Chigi in Ariccia, Staatliche Kunsthalle, Karlsruhe (url)
- Heinrich Füger (1751–1818), 2 works : Miniature of the Artist's Father, Akademie der bildenden Künste, Vienna (url)
- Lukas Furtenagel (1505-ca. 1546), 1 drawing : Portrait Sketch of the Dead Martin Luther, Staatliche Museen, Berlin (url)
- Henry Fuseli (1741–1825), 4 works : Dante and Virgil on the Ice of Kocythos, Kunsthaus, Zurich (url)

== G ==
- Taddeo Gaddi (1300–1366), 1 drawing : Presentation of the Virgin, Musée du Louvre, Paris (url)
- Thomas Gainsborough (1727–1788), 2 works : Six studies of a cat, Rijksmuseum, Amsterdam (url)
- Cornelis Galle the Elder (1576–1650), 1 engraving : Mary Queen of Heaven, Rockox House, Antwerp (url)
- Philip Galle (1537–1612), 5 works : The Alchemist, Metropolitan Museum of Art, New York (url)
- Theodoor Galle (1571–1633), 1 engraving : Opportunity Seized, Opportunity Missed, - (url)
- Ubaldo Gandolfi (1728–1781), 1 pastel : Portrait of a Young Boy, Musée du Louvre, Paris (url)
- Eduard Gärtner (1801–1877), 1 watercolour : English Embankment in Petersburg, The Hermitage, St. Petersburg (url)
- Giovanna Garzoni (1600–1670), 14 works : The Man from Artemino, Galleria Palatina (Palazzo Pitti), Florence (url)
- Charles-Étienne Gaucher (1741–1804), 1 engraving : The Comtesse du Barry, Wildenstein Institute, Paris (url)
- Paul Gauguin (1848–1903), 52 works : Design for a Fan, Ny Carlsberg Glyptotek, Copenhagen (url)
- Jacques-Fabien Gautier-Dagoty (1716–1785), 1 engraving : Back of Female, Bibliothèque Nationale, Paris (url)
- Paul Gavarni (c. 1804 – 1866), 3 works : What a Dreadful Salon, Bibliothèque Nationale, Paris (url)
- Walter Geikie (1795–1837), 1 etching : Drunken Man, National Gallery of Scotland, Edinburgh (url)
- Théodore Géricault (1791–1824), 7 works : English Horse in Stable, Musée du Louvre, Paris (url)
- Jacob de Gheyn II (1565–1629), 6 works : Four Studies of Frogs, Rijksmuseum, Amsterdam (url)
- Davide Ghirlandaio (1452–1525), 1 drawing : Bust Portraits of Two Boys (recto), Staatliche Museen, Berlin (url)
- Domenico Ghirlandaio (1449–1494), 7 works : Confirmation of the Rule, Staatliche Museen, Berlin (url)
- Giorgio Ghisi (1520–1582), 4 works : The Dream of Raphael, The Hermitage, St. Petersburg (url)
- Giambologna (c. 1524 – 1608), 2 works : Study for the Oceanus Fountain, Ashmolean Museum, Oxford (url)
- Giacinto Gigante (1806–1876), 1 watercolour : Riviera di Chiaia in Naples, The Hermitage, St. Petersburg (url)
- Claude Gillot (1673–1722), 1 drawing : Italian Comedians, Musée du Louvre, Paris (url)
- James Gillray (1756–1815), 6 works : Long Live the Constitution, One and In(di)visible, Bibliothèque Nationale, Paris (url)
- William Gilpin (priest) (1724–1804), 1 watercolour : Coast Scene, Cadet Harriott Cliff, British Museum, London (url)
- Giovanni Antonio da Brescia (c. 1460 – 1523), 2 works : Hercules and the Nemean Lion, Graphische Sammlung Albertina, Vienna (url)
- Giovanni da Udine (1487–1564), 4 works : Study of a Parrot, Nationalmuseum, Stockholm (url)
- Henri Gissey (1621–1673), 2 works : Louis XIV as Apollo, Bibliothèque Nationale, Paris (url)
- Giulio Romano (1499–1546), 6 works : Allegory of the Virtues of Federico II Gonzaga, J. Paul Getty Museum, Los Angeles (url)
- Hugo van der Goes (1440–1482), 1 drawing : Jacob and Rachel, Christ Church Picture Gallery, Oxford (url)
- Vincent van Gogh (1853–1890), 88 works : Miners in the Snow, Rijksmuseum Kröller-Müller, Otterlo (url)
- Hendrik Goltzius (1558–1617), 12 works : Venus between Ceres and Bacchus, Royal Museums of Fine Arts of Belgium, Brussels (url)
- Pietro Gonzaga (1751–1831), 2 works : Design of the Decoration for the Triumphal Red Gate in Moscow, The Hermitage, St. Petersburg (url)
- Jan Mabuse (1478–1532), 47 works : The Mystic Marriage of St Catherine, Statens Museum for Kunst, Copenhagen (url)
- Francisco Goya (1746–1828), 59 works : Self-Portrait, Museo del Prado, Madrid (url)
- Jan van Goyen (1596–1656), 2 works : View of Delft from the North, British Museum, London (url)
- Jean-Jacques Grandville (1803–1847), 4 works : Frenzied Romans at the First Performance of Hernani, Musée Victor Hugo, Paris (url)
- François Marius Granet (1775–1849), 1 watercolour : Quay of the Seine with Barge, Fog Effect, Musée du Louvre, Paris (url)
- Giovannino de' Grassi (1389–1398), 1 manuscript : Model Book, Biblioteca Civica, Bergamo (url)
- Josua de Grave (1643–1712), 3 works : City Façades of the Rotterdam and Schiedam Gates in Delft, Gemeentearchief, Delft (url)
- Hubert-François Gravelot (1699–1773), 1 engraving : "And Has Not Sawney Too His Lord and Whore?", British Museum, London (url)
- Pieter de Grebber (1600–1653), 5 works : The "Surrounding Gallery" at Honselaarsdijk (detail), Rijksmuseum, Amsterdam (url)
- El Greco (1541–1614), 4 works : St John the Evangelist, Biblioteca Nacional, Madrid (url)
- Valentine Green (1739–1813), 2 works : Portrait of the Ladies Waldegrave, The Hermitage, St. Petersburg (url)
- Matthias Greuter (1564–1638), 1 engraving : Beatus Philippus Nerius, Biblioteca Vallicelliana, Rome (url)
- Jean-Baptiste Greuze (1725–1805), 1 drawing : Madame Greuze, Rijksmuseum, Amsterdam (url)
- Giacomo Grimaldi (1560–1623), 3 works : Apse from the Old St. Peter's, Biblioteca Apostolica, Vatican (url)
- Pieter Anthonisz. van Groenewegen (1600–1658), 1 drawing : Landscape, Fogg Art Museum, Harvard University, Cambridge (url)
- Matthias Grünewald (1470/80-1528), 33 works : Virgin of the Annunciation, Staatliche Museen, Berlin (url)
- Francesco Guardi (1712–1793), 4 works : The Torre del Orologio, Musée du Petit Palais, Paris (url)
- Jean-Baptiste-Antoine Guélard (1719–1755), 2 works : Rest on the Hunt, Smithsonian Institution Libraries, Washington (url)
- Guercino (1591–1666), 1 drawing : A Cosmographer, University Art Museum, Princeton (url)
- Franz Ignaz Günther (1725–1775), 1 drawing : The Muse Clio Writing History, Wallraf-Richartz-Museum, Cologne (url)

== H ==
- Georg Abraham Hackert (1755–1805), 3 works : View of the Environs of Carpentras, The Hermitage, St. Petersburg (url)
- Jacob Philipp Hackert (1737–1807), 1 gouache : Lago d'Averno, Neue Pinakothek, Munich (url)
- Edward Petrovich Hau (1807–1887), 1 watercolour : The Cabinet of the Italian Schools, The Hermitage, St. Petersburg (url)
- Maarten van Heemskerck (1498–1574), 10 works : The Belvedere Torso, Staatliche Museen, Berlin (url)
- Herman Henstenburgh (1667–1726), 1 gouache : Insects, Musée du Louvre, Paris (url)
- Pieter van der Heyden (1530–1575), 5 works : The Blind Leading the Blind, New York Public Library, New York (url)
- Eduard Hildebrandt (1818–1869), 2 works : View of the Hagia Sophia in Constantinople, The Hermitage, St. Petersburg (url)
- Nicholas Hilliard (1537–1619), 2 works : Queen Elizabeth, British Museum, London (url)
- Augustin Hirschvogel (1503–1553), 1 etching : A Castle Yard, National Gallery of Art, Washington (url)
- Johann Nepomuk Hoechle (1790–1835), 1 drawing : Beethoven's Room, Museen der Stadt, Vienna (url)
- Jacob Hoefnagel (c. 1573 – 1630), 1 drawing : A Young Man Caresses an Old Woman, Graphische Sammlung Albertina, Vienna (url)
- Joris Hoefnagel (1542–1600), 2 works : Amersfoort, Rijksmuseum, Amsterdam (url)
- Hans Hoffmann (painter) (1530–1591), 2 works : Hare, Staatliche Museen, Berlin (url)
- William Hogarth (1697–1764), 1 etching : Gin Lane, Various collections (url)
- Frans Hogenberg (1535–1590), 2 works : The Calvinist Iconoclastic Riot of August 20, 1566, British Museum, London (url)
- Nicolaas Hogenberg (1500–1539), 1 etching : Virgin and Child, Bibliothèque Nationale, Paris (url)
- Ambrosius Holbein (1497–1543), 1 woodcut : The Island of Utopia, Öffentliche Kunstsammlung, Basel (url)
- Hans Holbein the Elder (1460–1524), 2 works : Ambrosius and Hans Holbein, Kupferstichkabinett, Staatliche Museen, Berlin (url)
- Hans Holbein the Younger (1497–1543), 39 works : Folly at the Lectern, Kupferstichkabinett, Öffentliche Kunstsammlung, Basel (url)
- Wenceslaus Hollar (1607–1677), 4 works : Giorgione's Self-Portrait as David, British Museum, London (url)
- Hendrik Hondius I (1573–1649), 1 engraving : Flower Piece with Birds, Graphische Sammlung Albertina, Vienna (url)
- Willem Hooft (1594–1658), 1 engraving : The Prodigal Son, Koninklijke Bibliotheek, The Hague (url)
- Romeyn de Hooghe (1645–1708), 1 etching : Battle of Narva on 19 November 1700, The Hermitage, St. Petersburg (url)
- Daniel Hopfer (1470–1536), 1 etching : Voluptas, The Hermitage, St. Petersburg (url)
- Lucas Horenbout (1455–1544), 1 watercolour : Henry VIII, King of England, Fitzwilliam Museum, Cambridge (url)
- Franz Horny (1798–1824), 1 drawing : View of Olevano, Staatliche Museen, Berlin (url)
- Gerard Houckgeest (1600–1661), 1 engraving : Imaginary Gothic Church, Rijksmuseum, Amsterdam (url)
- Wolf Huber (1490–1553), 2 works : Landscape with Castle, Ducal Graphic Collection, Wolfegg (url)
- Christophe Huet (1700–1759), 2 works : The Dance Lesson, Musée de Beaux-Arts, Valenciennes (url)
- Gabriel Huquier (1698–1750), 1 engraving : Design for a Large Centrepiece and Two Terrines in Silver, Bibliothèque Nationale, Paris (url)
- Jan van Huysum (1682–1749), 1 watercolour : Vase with Flowers, Musée du Louvre, Paris (url)

== I ==
- Jean Auguste Dominique Ingres (1780–1867), 3 works : Double Portrait of Otto Magnus von Stackelberg and Jacob Linckh, Musée Jenisch, Vevey (url)
- Eugène Isabey (1803–1886), 1 watercolour : Rocks at Saint-Malo, Musée du Louvre, Paris (url)
- Jean-Baptiste Isabey (1767–1855), 3 works : Prince August of Prussia, Wallace Collection, London (url)

== J ==
- Louis Jacob (1712–1802), 1 engraving : The Departure of the Italian Comedians in 1697, National Gallery of Art, Washington (url)
- Marie-Victoire Jaquotot (1772–1855), 1 gouache : A Basket of Flowers, Fitzwilliam Museum, Cambridge (url)
- Thomas Jefferys (c. 1719 – 1771), 2 works : Habit of the King of Poland, Smithsonian Institution Libraries, Washington (url)
- Christoffel Jegher (1596–1652), 3 works : The Garden of Love, Art Institute, Chicago (url)
- John Jones (c.1760-1791), 2 works : Serena, British Museum, London (url)
- Johan Jongkind (1819–1891), 3 works : Harbour of Honfleur, Szépmûvészeti Múzeum, Budapest (url)
- Jacob Jordaens (1593–1678), 2 works : Bearded Man Stepping Down, Museum Boijmans Van Beuningen, Rotterdam (url)

== K ==
- Heinrich Keller (1778–1862), 2 works : Das Oberdorftor in Zurich, Private collection (url)
- Jan van Kessel (Amsterdam) (1641–1680), 1 drawing : The Rotterdam Gate at Delft, Royal Museums of Fine Arts of Belgium, Brussels (url)
- Cornelis Ketel (1548–1616), 1 drawing : The Mirror of Virtue, Rijksmuseum, Amsterdam (url)
- Bálint Kiss (1802–1868), 1 drawing : Battle Scene, Magyar Nemzeti Galéria, Budapest (url)
- Salomon Kleiner (1703–1761), 3 works : Bird's-eye view of the Liechtenstein Garden Palace, Österreichisches Museum für angewandte Kunst, Vienna (url)
- Franz Kobell (1749–1822), 1 drawing : Coastal Landscape with Storm Approaching, Art Institute, Chicago (url)
- Jan Kobell I (1755–1833), 1 engraving : Portrait of Albert van Ryssel, Rijksmuseum, Twenthe (url)
- Wilhelm von Kobell (1766–1853), 1 watercolour : Gentleman on Horseback and Country Girl on the Banks of the Isar near Munich, Staatliche Museen, Berlin (url)
- Anton Koberger (c. 1440 – 1513), 1 woodcut : The Egidienplatz in Nuremberg, - (url)
- Heinrich Christoph Kolbe (1759–1835), 1 etching : Fantastical Tree, Staatliche Graphische Sammlung, Munich (url)
- Jan Harmensz Krul (c. 1601 – 1646), 2 works : Emblem, Universiteits-Bibliotheek, Amsterdam (url)
- Hans Süß von Kulmbach (c. 1480 – 1522), 1 drawing : Nude Woman with a Mirror, J. Paul Getty Museum, Los Angeles (url)

== L ==
- Carlo Labruzzi (1747/1748–1817), 1 drawing : View of the Chapel of Cardinal Branda Castiglione, Biblioteca Apostolica, Vatican (url)
- Jan l'Admiral (1699–1773), 1 etching : Portraits of Augustin Jorisz. Verburcht, Hendrick van Cleve, Melchior Orch and Hans Vredeman de Vries, Rijksmuseum, Amsterdam (url)
- Pieter van Laer (1592–1642), 1 drawing : Bentvueghels in a Roman Tavern, Staatliche Museen, Berlin (url)
- Antonio Lafreri (c. 1512 – 1577), 3 works : The Colosseum in Rome, British Museum, London (url)
- Jacques Lagniet (1620–1672), 2 works : The Nobleman is the Spider and the Peasant is the Fly, Bibliothèque Nationale, Paris (url)
- Gerard de Lairesse (1640–1711), 2 works : Five Female Heads, Rijksmuseum, Amsterdam (url)
- Jacques de Lajoue (1686–1761), 1 drawing : Winter, The Hermitage, St. Petersburg (url)
- Dominicus Lampsonius (1532–1599), 1 engraving : Portrait of Pieter Bruegel the Elder, - (url)
- Nicolas Lancret (1690–1743), 1 drawing : Study for Picnic after the Hunt, Bibliothèque Municipale, Rouen (url)
- Nicolas de Launay (1739–1792), 1 engraving : Les Adieux, Bibliothèque Nationale, Paris (url)
- Hans Sebald Lautensack (ca. 1520-ca. 1565), 1 etching : View of a Town along the River with a Church on the Right Bank, The Hermitage, St. Petersburg (url)
- Thomas Lawrence (1769–1830), 1 drawing : Portrait of Alexander I, The Hermitage, St. Petersburg (url)
- Charles Le Brun (1619–1690), 5 works : Louis XIV Visiting the Gobelins Factory, Musée du Louvre, Paris (url)
- Sébastien Leclerc (1637–1714) (1637–1714), 3 works : The Academy of Sciences and Fine Arts, Bibliothèque Nationale, Paris (url)
- Louis-Joseph Le Lorrain (1715–1759), 1 engraving : Temple of Venus, Bibliothèque Nationale, Paris (url)
- Jean Le Pautre (1618–1682), 6 works : Performance of Alceste in 1674, Musée National du Château, Versailles (url)
- Jean-Baptiste Le Prince (1734–1781), 1 aquatint : Calmouk, Musée Jenisch, Vevey (url)
- William Leighton Leitch (1804–1883), 1 watercolour : Italian Landscape, Museum of Art, Cleveland (url)
- Leonardo da Vinci (1452–1519), 151 works : Madonna and Child with St Anne and the Young St John, National Gallery, London (url)
- Ottavio Leoni (1578–1630), 6 works : Giovanni Lorenzo Bernini, British Museum, London (url)
- François-Bernard Lépicié (1698–1755), 2 works : Monument to Mignard, Bibliothèque Nationale, Paris (url)
- Alexandre-Isidore Leroy De Barde (1777–1828), 2 works : Crystallised Minerals, Musée du Louvre, Paris (url)
- Hans Leu the Younger (c. 1490 – 1531), 1 drawing : Meadow Landscape with Water-Mill, Staatliche Museen, Berlin (url)
- Lucas van Leyden (1494–1533), 24 works : Abraham and Isaac on Their Way to the Place of Sacrifice, Rijksmuseum, Amsterdam (url)
- Giorgio Liberale (1527-ca. 1579), 5 works : Sea animals, Österreichische Nationalbibliothek, Vienna (url)
- Jan Lievens (1607–1674), 1 drawing : Portrait of Poet Jan Vos, Städelsches Kunstinstitut, Frankfurt (url)
- Jacopo Ligozzi (1547–1627), 3 works : Psittacus Ararauna, Galleria degli Uffizi, Florence (url)
- Filippino Lippi (1457–1504), 2 works : Head of an Elderly Man, Museum der Bildenden Künste, Leipzig (url)
- Filippo Lippi (1406–1469), 4 works : Female Figure (Prophetess?), Harvard University Art Museum, Cambridge (url)
- Gian Paolo Lomazzo (1538–1600), 2 works : Head of an Executioner, Biblioteca Ambrosiana, Milan (url)
- Lambert Lombard (1505–1566), 1 drawing : Figure studies, Cabinet des estampes, Liège (url)
- Pietro Longhi (1702–1783), 1 drawing : Lute Player, Museo Correr, Venice (url)
- Melchior Lorck (1526–1594), 2 works : Portrait of Sultan Suleyman the Magnificent, Statens Museum for Kunst, Copenhagen (url)
- Lorenzo di Credi (1459–1537), 3 works : Bust of a Boy Wearing a Cap, Musée du Louvre, Paris (url)
- Lorenzo Monaco (1370–1423), 1 drawing : Studies, Metropolitan Museum of Art, New York (url)
- Domenico Lovisa (ca. 1690-ca. 1750), 1 woodcut : Campo Santi Giovanni e Paolo, Biblioteca Nazionale Marciana, Venice (url)
- Aurelio Luini (c. 1530 – 1593), 2 works : Sheet of Studies of Figures and Heads, Fondazione d'Arco, Mantua (url)
- Bernardino Luini (1480–1532), 2 works : Portrait of Biagio Arcimboldo, British Museum, London (url)
- Johannes Lutma II (1624–1685), 1 etching : Portrait of Johannes Lutma the Elder, The Hermitage, St. Petersburg (url)

== M ==
- Jean-Baptiste Mallet (1759–1835), 2 works : The Love Letter, Private collection (url)
- James Malton (1760–1803), 1 drawing : The Portico of the Parliament House, Dublin, Private collection (url)
- Karel van Mander (1548–1606), 1 drawing : Oriane Endavours to Perform Feats of Magic in the Garden of Apolidon, The Hermitage, St. Petersburg (url)
- Édouard Manet (1832–1883), 7 works : Baudelaire Bareheaded, Full Face, Bibliothèque Nationale, Paris (url)
- Andrea Mantegna (1430–1506), 7 works : Battle of the Sea Gods, Metropolitan Museum of Art, New York (url)
- Niklaus Manuel (c. 1484 – 1530), 1 drawing : Allegory of Death, Musée du Louvre, Paris (url)
- Aldus Manutius (c. 1450 – 1515), 1 woodcut : Poliphilus in a Wood, British Museum, London (url)
- Carlo Maratta (1625–1713), 1 drawing : Self-portrait, British Museum, London (url)
- Prosper Marilhat (1811–1847), 1 engraving : View of Ezbekiyah, Cairo, Bibliothèque Nationale, Paris (url)
- Daniel Marot (1662–1752), 1 drawing : Design for a Ceiling, The Hermitage, St. Petersburg (url)
- Jean Marot (1620–1679), 1 engraving : The Ceremonial Entry of Louis XIV and Marie-Thérèse into Paris in 1660, Bibliothèque Nationale, Paris (url)
- John Martin (painter) (1789–1854), 2 works : The Evening of the Deluge, Victoria and Albert Museum, London (url)
- Pietro Antonio Martini (1738–1797), 1 engraving : Exposition au Salon du Louvre en 1787, Wildenstein Institute, Paris (url)
- Jan Martszen de Jonge (1609–1647), 1 drawing : The Entry of Maria de' Medici to Amsterdam, Rijksmuseum, Amsterdam (url)
- Master ES (1450–1467), 8 works : Man of Sorrows between Four Angels, Kupferstichkabinett, Dresden (url)
- Master Fvb (1475–1500), 2 works : Saint Barbara, Metropolitan Museum of Art, New York (url)
- Master HL (active c. 1515-Upper Rhine), 1 woodcut : St Christopher, Bibliothèque Nationale, Paris (url)
- Master I. A. M. of Zwolle (1470–1495), 2 works : The Lactation of St Bernard, Rijksmuseum, Amsterdam (url)
- Master M Z (1500–1510), 8 works : Martyrdom of St Barbara, Germanisches Nationalmuseum, Nuremberg (url)
- Master of Balaam (active 1440s-), 1 engraving : St Eligius in His Workshop, Rijksmuseum, Amsterdam (url)
- Jacob Bellaert (c1450-c1486), 1 woodcut : Animals from De proprietatibus rerum, British Library (url)
- Master of the Housebook (1475–1490), 12 works : Aristotle and Phyllis, Rijksmuseum, Amsterdam (url)
- Master of the Playing Cards (active 1435-1450-1450), 2 works : King of Wild Men, Kupferstichkabinett, Dresden (url)
- Jacob Matham (1571–1631), 2 works : Samson and Delilah, Rockox House, Antwerp (url)
- Theodor Matham (1605–1676), 3 works : Man with Roemer and Pipe, Fogg Art Museum, Cambridge (url)
- Israhel van Meckenem (1445–1503), 8 works : The Artist and His Wife Ida, Staatliche Museen, Berlin (url)
- Juste-Aurèle Meissonnier (1698–1750), 1 drawing : Design of a Couch for Count Bilenski, The Hermitage, St. Petersburg (url)
- Claude Mellan (1598–1688), 5 works : Frontispiece of a Bible, Bibliothèque Nationale, Paris (url)
- Francesco Melzi (1493–1570), 4 works : Portrait of Leonardo, Royal Library, Windsor (url)
- Matthäus Merian (1593–1650), 2 works : View of the Neuegebäude, Kunsthistorisches Museum, Vienna (url)
- Charles Meryon (1821–1868), 1 etching : The Petit Pont, Bibliothèque Nationale, Paris (url)
- Gabriël Metsu (1629–1667), 1 drawing : Woman Figure, Städelsches Kunstinstitut, Frankfurt (url)
- Conrad Martin Metz (1749–1827), 1 engraving : The Triumph of Bacchus in India, British Museum, London (url)
- Michelangelo (1475–1564), 168 works : Tomb of Julius II, Galleria degli Uffizi, Florence (url)
- Pierre Milan (1545–1557), 1 engraving : Nymph of Fontainebleau, The Hermitage, St. Petersburg (url)
- Jean-François Millet (1814–1875), 1 drawing : Catherine Lemaire, Museum of Fine Arts, Boston (url)
- Pierre-Etienne Moitte (1722–1780), 1 engraving : The Marquis de Beringhen, Bibliothèque Nationale, Paris (url)
- Bernard de Montfaucon (1655–1741), 2 works : Old Testament figures, Bibliothèque Nationale, Paris (url)
- Octavianus Montfort (17th century-), 2 works : Flowers, Fitzwilliam Museum, Cambridge (url)
- Jean-Michel Moreau (1741–1814), 3 works : Banquet Given in the Presence of the King, Musée du Louvre, Paris (url)
- Paulus Moreelse (1571–1638), 1 drawing : Design of Catharijnepoort in Utrecht, Municipal Archive, Utrecht (url)
- Jean Morin (ca. 1590-1650), 2 works : Memento Mori, Bibliothèque Nationale, Paris (url)
- Jan Harmensz. Muller (1571–1628), 1 engraving : Mercury and Psyche, viewed from three sides, Rijksmuseum, Amsterdam (url)
- Christoph Murer (1558–1614), 1 drawing : Apollo and Daphne, Crocker Art Museum, Sacramento (url)
- Bartolomé Esteban Murillo (1617–1682), 1 drawing : Virgin and Child, Museum of Art, Cleveland (url)
- Agostino dei Musi (c. 1490 – 1536), 1 engraving : The Academy of Baccio Bandinelli in Rome, Rijksmuseum, Amsterdam (url)

== N ==
- Robert Nanteuil (1623–1678), 2 works : Louis XIV, British Museum, London (url)
- Christoph Nathe (1753–1806), 1 drawing : Village Street with Houses, Staatliche Museen, Berlin (url)
- Reinier Nooms (1623–1664), 1 etching : The Prinsengracht and the Noorderkerk at Amsterdam, Rijksmuseum, Amsterdam (url)

== O ==
- Peter Oliver (painter) (1594–1647), 1 watercolour : Portrait of a Young Gentleman, Private collection (url)
- Ferdinand Olivier (1785–1841), 3 works : Meadow before Aigen, Friday, Staatliche Graphische Sammlung, Munich (url)
- John Opie (1761–1807), 1 engraving : Scene from Shakespeare's Winter's Tale, British Museum, London (url)
- Bernard van Orley (1490–1541), 2 works : Count Henry I of Nassau with his Bride, Staatliche Graphische Sammlung, Munich (url)
- Abraham Ortelius (1528–1598), 1 engraving : Image of the Pilgrimage of St Paul, - (url)
- Adriaen van Ostade (1610–1685), 7 works : Scene in the Tavern, Graphic Cabinet, Dresden (url)
- Michael Ostendorfer (c. 1494 – 1549), 1 woodcut : The Pilgrimage to the "Fair Virgin" in Regensburg, Kunstsammlung der Veste Coburg, Coburg (url)
- Jean-Baptiste Oudry (1686–1755), 2 works : The Park at Arcueil, Musée du Louvre, Paris (url)
- Jean Ouvrier (1725–1784), 1 engraving : The Two Confidantes, Musée du Louvre, Paris (url)
- Friedrich Overbeck (1789–1869), 1 drawing : Christ Resurrects the Daughter of Jairus, Staatliche Museen, Berlin (url)

== P ==
- Francisco Pacheco (1564–1644), 1 engraving : Pedro de Campaña (Pieter Kempeneer), Museo Lázaro Galdiano, Madrid (url)
- Anthonie Palamedesz. (1601–1673), 4 works : Seated Cavalier with a Sword and a Raised Glass, Prentenkabinet, University of Leiden, Leiden (url)
- Samuel Palmer (1805–1881), 4 works : Self-Portrait, Ashmolean Museum, Oxford (url)
- Isabella Parasole (c. 1565 – 1625), 2 works : Il Teatro delle nobili et virtuose donne, Houghton Library, Harvard University, Cambridge (url)
- Luis Paret y Alcázar (1746–1799), 1 gouache : Zebra, Museo del Prado, Madrid (url)
- Giulio Parigi (1571–1635), 1 drawing : Scenery with River Allegories, Private collection (url)
- Parmigianino (1503–1540), 3 works : Circe and the Companions of Ulysses, Galleria degli Uffizi, Florence (url)
- William Pars (1742–1782), 1 watercolour : The Rhône Glacier and the Source of the Rhône, British Museum, London (url)
- Crispijn van de Passe the Younger (1564–1637), 5 works : Backgammon Players, Universiteits-Bibliotheek, Amsterdam (url)
- Hans Paur (1445–1472), 1 woodcut : The Martyrdom of St Sebastian, Staatliche Graphische Sammlung, Munich (url)
- Georg Pencz (1500–1550), 1 engraving : Caritas, Germanisches Nationalmuseum, Nuremberg (url)
- Gianfrancesco Penni (1488–1528), 2 works : The Battle at Pons Milvius, Musée du Louvre, Paris (url)
- Gabriel Perelle (1603–1677), 7 works : Château de Choisy, Bibliothèque Nationale, Paris (url)
- Perino del Vaga (1500–1547), 1 drawing : North Façade of the Villa Doria, Rijksmuseum, Amsterdam (url)
- Paul Petau (1568–1614), 1 engraving : Saint-Riquier, Bibliothèque Nationale, Paris (url)
- Johann Anton de Peters (1725–1795), 1 watercolour : The Happy Mother, Wallraf-Richartz-Museum, Cologne (url)
- Simone Peterzano (ca. 1540-ca. 1596), 2 works : Head of an Old Bearded Man, Musei Civici del Castello, Milan (url)
- Ennemond Alexandre Petitot (1727–1801), 1 engraving : Greek Masquerade: The Bride, Bibliothèque Nationale, Paris (url)
- Franz Pforr (1788–1812), 1 drawing : Raphael, Fra Angelico and Michelangelo over Rome, Städelsches Kunstinstitut, Frankfurt (url)
- Giacomo Piccini (ca. 1617-ca. 1669), 1 engraving : Judith, British Museum, London (url)
- Cipriano di Michele Piccolpasso (c. 1523 – 1579), 1 engraving : Putting into Oven and First Firing, - (url)
- Pietro da Cortona (1596–1669), 3 works : Study for the Age of Silver, Galleria degli Uffizi, Florence (url)
- Isidore Pils (1813–1875), 1 watercolour : Study of Soldier, Fogg Art Museum, Harvard University, Cambridge (url)
- Giovanni Pinadello (active 1580s-), 1 engraving : Pope Sixtus V, Metropolitan Museum of Art, New York (url)
- Pinturicchio (1452–1513), 2 works : Homage to Pope Eugenius IV in the Name of Emperor Frederick III, Devonshire Collection, Chatsworth (url)
- Giovanni Battista Piranesi (1720–1778), 9 works : Carceri d'Invenzione, Various collections (url)
- Pisanello (1395–1455), 25 works : The Luxury, Graphische Sammlung Albertina, Vienna (url)
- Camille Pissarro (1830–1903), 5 works : Study of Upper Norwood, London, Ashmolean Museum, Oxford (url)
- Wilhelm Pleydenwurff (c. 1460 – 1494), 1 woodcut : Nuremberg Chronicle, page XLI (recto), Bayerische Staatsbibliothek, Munich (url)
- Simon de Poelenborch (ca1592), 1 etching : Banquet on a Terrace, Museum Boijmans Van Beuningen, Rotterdam (url)
- Cornelius van Poelenburgh (1595–1667), 1 drawing : Figures beneath the Arches of a Classical Ruin, Rijksmuseum, Amsterdam (url)
- François de Poilly (1623–1693), 1 engraving : View and Perspective of the Trianon at Versailles, Bibliothèque Nationale, Paris (url)
- Polidoro da Caravaggio (1499–1543), 5 works : Design for a Vase, National Gallery of Scotland, Edinburgh (url)
- Antonio del Pollaiuolo (1433–1498), 1 engraving : Battle of Ten Nudes, Galleria degli Uffizi, Florence (url)
- Paulus Pontius (1603–1658), 2 works : Portrait of Constantijn Huygens, British Museum, London (url)
- Pontormo (1494–1556), 43 works : Study for the Lunette with Vertumnus and Pomona, Galleria degli Uffizi, Florence (url)
- Matthijs Pool (1676–1722), 4 works : The Holy Family with a Dove, Art Collection, University of Liège, Liège (url)
- Il Pordenone (1483–1539), 1 drawing : The Martyrdom of St Peter, Galleria degli Uffizi, Florence (url)
- Pieter Post (1608–1669), 1 etching : Statenzaal van Holland, Rijksprentenkabinet, Amsterdam (url)
- Paulus Potter (1625–1654), 2 works : Deer in the Wood, Rijksmuseum, Amsterdam (url)
- Nicolas Poussin (1594–1665), 5 works : Polyphemus Discovers Acis and Galatea, Royal Library, Windsor (url)
- Giovanni Ambrogio de Predis (c.1455–after 1508), 2 works : Maximilian I, Staatliche Museen, Berlin (url)
- Luigi Premazzi (1814–1891), 1 watercolour : The Room of Coins and Medals, The Hermitage, St. Petersburg (url)
- Francesco Primaticcio (1504–1570), 3 works : Ceres, Musée Condé, Chantilly (url)
- Pierre-Paul Prud'hon (1758–1823), 1 drawing : Nude Viewed from Behind, Forsyth Wickes Museum of Fine Arts, Boston (url)
- Pierre Puget (1620–1694), 7 works : Vessel Firing a Salvo, Musée des Beaux-Arts, Marseille (url)
- Augustus Charles Pugin (1768–1832), 1 engraving : Specimens of Gothic Architecture (frontispiece), Private collection (url)

== Q ==
- Jacopo della Quercia (1367–1438), 1 drawing : Fonte Gaia, Metropolitan Museum of Art, New York (url)
- Gillis Quintijn (1590–1635), 1 engraving : Illustration, Universiteits-Bibliotheek, Amsterdam (url)

== R ==
- Daniel Rabel (1578–1637), 2 works : The Royal Ballet of the Dowager of Bilbao's Grand Ball, Musée du Louvre, Paris (url)
- Abraham Rademaker (1677–1725), 1 drawing : The Jesuit Church on the Oude Langendijk in Delft, Gemeentearchief, Delft (url)
- Raphael (1483–1520), 66 works : Study for the Coronation of St Nicholas of Tolentino, Musée des Beaux-Arts, Lille (url)
- Marcantonio Raimondi (ca. 1480-ca. 1534), 16 works : The Adoration of the Shepherds, Staatliche Museen, Berlin (url)
- Johannes de Ram (1648–1693), 4 works : Map and Profile of Delft, Gemeente Musea, Delft (url)
- Simon François Ravenet I (1706–1774), 2 works : The Cries of Paris: Radishes, Turnips, Bibliothèque Nationale, Paris (url)
- Pierre-Joseph Redouté (1759–1840), 2 works : Rosa Bifera Macrocarpa, Muséum National d'Histoire Naturelle, Paris (url)
- Theodor Markus Rehbenitz (1791–1861), 1 drawing : Self-Portrait, Staatliche Kunstsammlungen, Dresden (url)
- Ramsay Richard Reinagle (1775–1862), 1 drawing : Self-Portrait, British Museum, London (url)
- Johann Christian Reinhart (1761–1847), 1 engraving : Landscape with Town and Bridge, Staatliche Graphische Sammlung, Munich (url)
- Rembrandt (1606–1669), 42 works : Old Beggar Woman with a Gourd, Rijksmuseum, Amsterdam (url)
- Pierre-Auguste Renoir (1841–1919), 1 lithograph : Pinning the Hat, Museum of Modern Art, New York (url)
- Alfred Rethel (1816–1859), 1 woodcut : Death on the Barricades, - (url)
- Erhard Reuwich (1455–1490), 1 woodcut : Animal page, Bayerische Staatsbibliothek, Munich (url)
- Jusepe de Ribera (1590–1656), 2 works : St Albert, British Museum, London (url)
- Marco Ricci (1676–1730), 2 works : A Courtyard with an Equestrian Statue, Royal Collection, Windsor (url)
- Adrian Ludwig Richter (1803–1884), 1 watercolour : The Fuschlsee with the Schafberg Mountain in the Salzkammergut, Staatliche Museen, Berlin (url)
- Johan Richter (painter) (1665–1745), 1 engraving : The Bacino di San Marco, Private collection (url)
- Carlo Ridolfi (1594–1658), 1 engraving : Paolo Veronese, Staats- und Universitatsbibliothek, Göttingen (url)
- Pieter Cornelisz van Rijck (1567–1637), 1 drawing : Kitchen Scene with the Supper at Emmaus, The Hermitage, St. Petersburg (url)
- Cesare Ripa (c. 1555 – 1622), 3 works : Forza d'amore, Biblioteca Ambrosiana, Milan (url)
- Hubert Robert (1733–1808), 3 works : The Artist Drawing in the Farnese Gardens, Musée du Louvre, Paris (url)
- Piercy Roberts (1795–1825), 1 drawing : Napoleon and Pitt Observing Each Other, Bibliothèque Nationale, Paris (url)
- Giacomo Rocca (15??–ca. 1592), 1 drawing : Michelangelo's Draft for the Tomb of Julius II, Staatliche Museen, Berlin (url)
- Roelant Roghman (1627–1692), 1 drawing : Loenersloot Castle, Städelsches Kunstintitut, Frankfurt (url)
- Gabriel Rollenhagen (1583–1619), 1 engraving : Emblem, Public Library, New York (url)
- Peter Rollos the Elder (1619–1639), 1 woodcut : Illustration, Public Library, New York (url)
- Girolamo Romani (c.1484–c.1560), 2 works : Two Nude Men, Galleria degli Uffizi, Florence (url)
- George Romney (painter) (1734–1802), 1 drawing : Study for Elizabeth Warren as Hebe, National Gallery of Scotland, Edinburgh (url)
- Francesco Rosselli (1448–1527), 2 works : View of Florence with the Chain, Biblioteca Nazionale Centrale, Florence (url)
- Dante Gabriel Rossetti (1828–1882), 2 works : Fra Angelico Painting, Birmingham Museum and Art Gallery, Birmingham (url)
- Rosso Fiorentino (1494–1541), 1 drawing : Mars and Venus, Musée du Louvre, Paris (url)
- Thomas Rowlandson (1756/57–1827), 5 works : Italian Picture Dealers, Bibliothèque Nationale, Paris (url)
- Peter Paul Rubens (1577–1640), 9 works : Esther before Ahasuerus, Akademie der bildenden Künste, Vienna (url)
- Philipp Otto Runge (1777–1810), 6 works : Study to the Morning, Staatliche Museen, Berlin (url)

== S ==
- Aegidius Sadeler (1570–1629), 4 works: Caligula, British Museum, London (url)
- Jan Sadeler I (1550–1600), 2 works: The Holy Family in Egypt, Staatliche Museen, Berlin (url)
- Raphael Sadeler (1560–1628), 1 engraving: The Crucifixion, National Gallery of Art, Washington (url)
- Jan Saenredam (1565–1607), 1 engraving: Athena Leaning on Her Shield, Metropolitan Museum of Art, New York (url)
- Pieter Jansz. Saenredam (1597–1665), 3 works: Interior of the Choir of Sint-Bavokerk at Haarlem, Schlossmuseum, Weimar (url)
- Charles-Germain de Saint-Aubin (1721–1786), 1 engraving: The Toilette, Bibliothèque Nationale, Paris (url)
- Gabriel de Saint-Aubin (1724–1780), 5 works: The Randon de Boisset Gallery, Musée des Arts décoratifs, Paris (url)
- Gillot Saint-Evre (1791–1858), 1 lithograph: Louis XI and Isabelle de Croye, scene from Quentin Durward, Musée national Eugène Delacroix, Paris (url)
- Jean de Saint-Igny (1595–1649), 4 works: Fashion Plate, Bibliothèque des Art décoratifs, Paris (url)
- Cecchino del Salviati (1510–1563), 1 drawing: Design for a Ewer, Ashmolean Museum, Oxford (url)
- Paul Sandby (1725/26-1809), 2 works: Cow-Girl in the Windsor Great Park, British Museum, London (url)
- Joachim von Sandrart (1606–1688), 3 works: Matthias Grünewald in his Youth, Germanisches Nationalmuseum, Nuremberg (url)
- Giuliano da Sangallo (1445–1516), 1 drawing: Ruins of the Ancient Roman Theater of Marcellus, Biblioteca Apostolica, Vatican (url)
- John Singer Sargent (1856–1925), 1 watercolour: Venetian Passageway, Metropolitan Museum of Art, New York (url)
- Roelant Savery (1576–1639), 1 drawing: Rocky Landscape, The Hermitage, St. Petersburg (url)
- Girolamo Savoldo (c.1480–c.1548), 4 works: Head of St Jerome, Musée du Louvre, Paris (url)
- Orazio Scarabelli (active c. 1589-), 1 etching: La Naumachia, Galleria degli Uffizi, Florence (url)
- Godfried Schalcken (1643–1706), 1 etching: Man Making an Obscene Gesture, Rijksmuseum, Amsterdam (url)
- George Johann Scharf (1788–1860), 1 drawing: The Roadmenders, British Museum, London (url)
- Hartmann Schedel (1440–1514), 4 works: Nuremberg Chronicle, Page 100: View of the city of Nuremberg, Bayerische Staatsbibliothek, Munich (url)
- Peter Schenk the Elder (1660–1711), 2 works: Bird's-Eye View of the Huis ter Nieuburch at Rijswijck, Gemeentearchief, The Hague (url)
- Karl Friedrich Schinkel (1781–1841), 1 drawing: Portrait of the Artist's Daughter, Marie, Staatliche Museen, Berlin (url)
- Julius Schnorr Von Carolsfeld (1794–1872), 3 works: Seated Boy Playing a Pipe, Kunsthalle, Hamburg (url)
- Erhard Schön (c. 1491 – 1542), 2 works: Complaint of the Poor Persecuted Idols, Germanisches Nationalmuseum, Nuremberg (url)
- Martin Schongauer (1440–1491), 27 works: The Man of Sorrows with the Virgin Mary and St John the Evangelist, Graphische Sammlung Albertina, Vienna (url)
- Moritz von Schwind (1804–1871), 2 works: The Dream of Erwin von Steinbach, Staatliche Graphische Sammlung, Munich (url)
- Jan van Scorel (1495–1562), 1 drawing: Valley in the Alps, British Museum, London (url)
- Diana Scultori (c. 1547 – 1612), 4 works: Achilles Bearing the Body of Patroclus, British Museum, London (url)
- Sebastiano del Piombo (1485–1547), 2 works: Holy Family with a Donor and the Infant St John (recto), Royal Collection, Windsor (url)
- Hercules Seghers (1589–1638), 3 works: The Great Tree, Rijksmuseum, Amsterdam (url)
- Johan Tobias Sergel (1740–1814), 1 drawing: Plunging into Despair, Nationalmuseum, Stockholm (url)
- Bartolomeo Sermartelli (fl. 1563-1600), 1 woodcut: Rape of the Sabines, Beinecke Library, Yale University, New Haven (url)
- Pieter Serwouters (1586–1657), 1 engraving: Grace before the Meal, Statens Museum for Kunst, Copenhagen (url)
- Georges Seurat (1859–1891), 1 drawing: A Woman Fishing, Metropolitan Museum of Art, New York (url)
- Semyon Fyodorovich Shchedrin (1745–1804), 2 works: Landscape with a Farm in the Park in Tsarskoye Selo, The Hermitage, St. Petersburg (url)
- Paul Signac (1863–1935), 2 works: Saint-Tropez, the Harbour, Szépmûvészeti Múzeum, Budapest (url)
- Luca Signorelli (1441–1523), 3 works: Study of nudes, Galleria degli Uffizi, Florence (url)
- Israël Silvestre (1621–1691), 11 works: Grand Cavalcade Given in Paris in 1662, Bibliothèque Nationale, Paris (url)
- Elisabetta Sirani (1638–1665), 4 works: Study, Walker Art Gallery, Liverpool (url)
- Giovanni Antonio Sogliani (1492–1544), 1 drawing: Multiplication of the Loaves and Fishes, Galleria degli Uffizi, Florence (url)
- Pyotr Sokolov (1791–1848), 1 watercolour: Portrait of Natalia Zagriazhskaya, The Hermitage, St. Petersburg (url)
- Andrea Solari (c.1465–1524), 1 drawing: Head of a Bearded Man, Metropolitan Museum of Art, New York (url)
- Henry Somm (1844–1907), 2 works: The Red Overcoat, Musée des Beaux-Arts, Rouen (url)
- Hans Speckaert (1540–1581), 1 drawing: Nude Soldiers Fighting, Rijksmuseum, Amsterdam (url)
- Parri Spinelli (1387–1453), 1 drawing: Navicella, Metropolitan Museum of Art, New York (url)
- Pieter Steenwijck (1615–1666), 1 drawing: Vanitas Still-Life with Gorget and Cuirass, Museum Boijmans Van Beuningen, Rotterdam (url)
- Théophile Alexandre Steinlen (1859–1923), 3 works: The Entourage, Art Institute, Chicago (url)
- Pieter Stevens II (ca. 1567-after 1624), 1 drawing: Landscape with a Footbridge, The Hermitage, St. Petersburg (url)
- Tobias Stimmer (1539–1584), 2 works: Andrea Doria, National Gallery of Art, Washington (url)
- Andries Jacobsz Stock (1580–1648), 1 engraving: Witches' Sabbath, Rijksmuseum, Amsterdam (url)
- Veit Stoss (c. 1438 – 1533), 2 works: Lamentation, Szépmûvészeti Múzeum, Budapest (url)
- Jacopo Strada (c. 1515 – 1588), 1 drawing: Sketch for the Trappings of an Elephant, Österreichische Nationalbibliothek, Vienna (url)
- Stradanus (1523–1605), 3 works: Silkworm Farm (1), Royal Collection, Windsor (url)
- François Stroobant (1819–1916), 1 coloured lithograph: Ruins of the Abbey of Villers, University of Liège, Liège (url)
- George Stubbs (1724–1806), 2 works: Bird, British Museum, London (url)
- Louis Surugue (c. 1686 – 1762), 1 engraving: Escalier des Ambassadeurs in Versailles, Bibliothèque Nationale, Paris (url)
- Francesco Susini (1585–1653), 3 works: Illustration from "Disegni e misure e regole", Galleria degli Uffizi, Florence (url)
- Willem Isaacsz Swanenburg (1610–1674), 4 works: The Judgment of Paris, Rijksmuseum, Amsterdam (url)
- Jan Swart van Groningen (1495–1560), 2 works: Woman Lamenting by a Burning City, Rijksmuseum, Amsterdam (url)

== T ==
- Tanzio da Varallo (ca. 1580-ca. 1632), 2 works : Study for an Angel, Metropolitan Museum of Art, New York (url)
- Nicolas-Henry Tardieu (1674–1749), 1 engraving : Watteau and his Friend Monsieur de Jullienne, Bibliothèque Nationale, Paris (url)
- Agostino Tassi (1578–1644), 3 works : View of the Acqua Acetosa, Rome, Private collection (url)
- Antonio Tempesta (1555–1630), 5 works : The Death of Adonis, Galleria Sabauda, Turin (url)
- Johan Teyler (1648–1712), 2 works : Admiralty Shipyard, The Hermitage, St. Petersburg (url)
- André Thevet (1516–1592), 1 engraving : Cosimo I de' Medici in His Study, Ryan Memorial Library, Wynnewood, Pa. (url)
- Léonard Thiry (1490–1550), 1 drawing : Female Mask, Bibliothèque de l'École Nationale Supérieur des Beaux-Arts, Paris (url)
- Tintoretto (1518–1594), 3 works : Venus, Mars, and Vulcan, Staatliche Museen, Berlin
- Hans Tirol (ca. 1505-ca. 1575), 1 coloured woodcut : Investiture of the Elector of Saxony in the Weinmarkt, Augsburg, Städtische Kunstsammlungen, Augsburg (url)
- Titian (1485–1576), 6 works : Portrait of a Young Woman, Galleria degli Uffizi, Florence (url)
- Henri de Toulouse-Lautrec (1864–1901), 35 works : Moulin Rouge: La Goulue, Civica Raccolta delle Stampe Bertarelli, Milan (url)
- J. M. W. Turner (1775–1851), 2 works : San Giorgio Maggiore at Dawn, Tate Gallery, London (url)

== U ==
- Paolo Uccello (1396–1475), 1 drawing : Perspective Study, Galleria degli Uffizi, Florence (url)
- Lucas van Uden (1595–1672), 1 drawing : Landscape with Tall Trees, Kunsthalle, Hamburg (url)
- Ugo da Carpi (c. 1480 – 1523), 1 chiaroscuro woodcut : Hero and Sibyl, National Gallery of Art, Washington (url)
- Carlo Urbino (1550–1585), 2 works : The Art of Cooking (recto), École Nationale Supérieur des Beaux-Arts, Paris (url)

== V ==
- Werner van den Valckert (1585–1645), 1 etching : Sleeping Venus, Rijksmuseum, Amsterdam (url)
- Juan de Valdés Leal (1622–1690), 1 etching : Monument to St Ferdinand, - (url)
- Giorgio Vasari (1511–1574), 4 works : Annunciation, The Morgan Library and Museum, New York (url)
- Otto van Veen (1556–1629), 3 works : Emblem, Koninklijke Bibliotheek, The Hague (url)
- Adriaen van de Velde (1636–1672), 6 works : Bull, The Hermitage, St. Petersburg (url)
- Jan van de Velde the Elder (1568–1623), 1 drawing : Spieghel der schrijfkonste, Rijksmuseum, Amsterdam (url)
- Jan van de Velde (1593–1641), 4 works : The Oostpoort (East Gate) at Delft, Musée de l'École nationale supérieure des Beaux-Arts, Paris (url)
- Dirck Vellert (1480–1547), 3 works : St Bernard Adoring the Christ Child, Metropolitan Museum of Art, New York (url)
- Adriaen van de Venne (1589–1662), 5 works : Frontispiece, Universiteits-Bibliotheek, Amsterdam (url)
- Jan Verkolje (1650–1693), 6 works : Portrait of an Anatomist, Museum Boijmans Van Beuningen, Rotterdam (url)
- Jan Cornelisz Vermeyen (1500–1559), 2 works : Oriental Meal, Bibliothèque Nationale, Paris (url)
- Andrea del Verrocchio (1435–1488), 1 drawing : Head of a Girl (study), British Museum, London (url)
- Andreas Vesalius (1514–1564), 3 works : Title page, National Library of Medicine, Washington (url)
- Enea Vico (1523–1567), 3 works : Aristotle, British Museum, London (url)
- Louise Élisabeth Vigée Le Brun (1755–1842), 1 drawing : Woman's Head, École des Beaux-Arts, Paris (url)
- Giacomo da Vignola (1507–1573), 1 drawing : Perspective diagram, Biblioteca, Bologna (url)
- Claude Vignon (1593–1670), 1 engraving : St Philip Baptizing the Eunuch of Candace, Bibliothèque Nationale, Paris (url)
- Villamena (1564–1624), 1 engraving : The Gardener, Museo Civici d'Arte e Storia, Brescia (url)
- Villard De Honnecourt (ca. 1200-ca. 1250), 2 works : Lion drawn from life, Bibliothèque Nationale, Paris (url)
- David Vinckboons (1576–1629), 1 drawing : Elderly Fisherman with a Girl, Institut Néerlandais, Paris (url)
- Antonio Visentini (1688–1782), 5 works : Piazza Santi Giovanni e Paolo, The Hermitage, St. Petersburg (url)
- Claes Jansz. Visscher (1587–1652), 1 engraving : Christ Healing the Sick, Los Angeles County Museum of Art, Los Angeles (url)
- Claes Jansz. Visscher (1587–1652), 9 works : Jan Deyman's Country House and Orchard, Rijksmuseum, Amsterdam (url)
- Cornelis Visscher (1628–1658), 1 engraving : Lieven Coppenol, Metropolitan Museum of Art, New York (url)
- Roemer Visscher (1547–1620), 2 works : Emblem from Sinnepoppen, Universiteits-Bibliotheek, Amsterdam (url)
- Teresa Berenice Vitelli (1706–1729), 1 gouache : Parrot, Blue Tit, Two Lizards, and Vases, Galleria Palatina (Palazzo Pitti), Florence (url)
- Alvise Vivarini (1445–1503), 1 drawing : Portrait of a Young Man, Staatliche Museen, Berlin (url)
- Nicolas Vleughels (1668–1737), 2 works : Study for the Head of Campaspe, Musée du Louvre, Paris (url)
- Simon de Vlieger (1600–1653), 2 works : The Northwest Side of the Rotterdam Gate at Delft in Winter, Rijksmuseum, Amsterdam (url)
- Hendrick Cornelisz. van Vliet (1611–1675), 5 works : Sketchbook, Museum Boijmans Van Beuningen, Rotterdam (url)
- Lucas Vorsterman II (1595–1675), 4 works : Brutus, The Hermitage, St. Petersburg (url)
- Jacob Vosmaer (1574–1641), 1 drawing : Landscape with a Tall Tree on the Right, Rijksmuseum, Amsterdam (url)
- Simon Vouet (1590–1649), 1 drawing : Eight Satyrs Admiring the Anamorphosis of an Elephant, Hessisches Landesmuseum, Darmstadt (url)

== W ==
- Joseph Wagner (1706–1780), 1 etching : Charlatan, The Hermitage, St. Petersburg (url)
- George Walker (1781–1856), 1 lithograph : Yorkshire Miner, British Museum, London (url)
- Antoine Watteau (1684–1721), 13 works : Sitting Couple, Armand Hammer Collection, Los Angeles (url)
- Johann Wilhelm Weinmann (1683–1741), 4 works : Illustration from Phytanthoza iconographia, - (url)
- Rogier van der Weyden (1400–1464), 7 works : Young Man, Staatliche Museen, Berlin (url)
- James McNeill Whistler (1834–1903), 3 works : Lady in Grey, Metropolitan Museum of Art, New York (url)
- Hieronymus Wierix (1553–1619), 4 works : Acedia, Metropolitan Museum of Art, New York (url)
- Jan Wierix (1549–1625), 1 engraving : The Painter Jan Mabuse, Rijksmuseum, Amsterdam (url)
- David Wilkie (artist) (1785–1841), 1 watercolour : Sotiri, Dragoman of Mr Colquhoun, Ashmolean Museum, Oxford (url)
- Johann Georg Wille (1715–1808), 3 works : Paternal Instruction, Rijksmuseum, Amsterdam (url)
- Hugh William Williams (1773–1829), 1 watercolour : View of the Plain of Troy from One of the Tumuli on the Citadel, Private collection (url)
- Heinrich Wirrich (ca. 1515-ca. 1572), 2 works : Proper description of the Christian wedding, Österreichisches Museum für angewandte Kunst, Vienna (url)
- Jacob de Wit (1695–1754), 1 drawing : Baptism of Christ in the Jordan, Amstelkring Museum, Amsterdam (url)
- Jan Witdoeck (1615-after 1642), 1 engraving : Abraham and Melchizedech, The Hermitage, St. Petersburg (url)
- Gaspar van Wittel (1653–1736), 2 works : Piazza San Marco: Looking South, Biblioteca Nazionale, Rome (url)
- Michael Wolgemut (1434–1519), 3 works : Sermon of the Antichrist, Various collections (url)
- Joachim Wtewael (1566–1638), 1 drawing : Danaë, Staatliche Graphische Sammlung, Munich (url)

== Z ==
- Anton Maria Zanetti II (1706–1778), 1 etching : Standing Female Nude, British Museum, London (url)
- Mihály Zichy (1827–1906), 14 works : Coronation of Alexander II, The Hermitage, St. Petersburg (url)
- Johann Ziegler (1749–1812), 1 coloured engraving : English landscape garden, Liechtenstein Museum, Vienna (url)
- Giuseppe Zocchi (1711/1717–1767), 2 works : Canto dei Carnesecchi, Metropolitan Museum of Art, New York (url)
- Aleksey Fyodorovich Zubov (c. 1682 – 1751), 3 works : Battle of Grengam on 27 July 1720, The Hermitage, St. Petersburg (url)
- Federico Zuccari (1541–1609), 6 works : Portrait of Giambologna, National Gallery of Scotland, Edinburgh (url)
- Taddeo Zuccari (1529–1566), 1 drawing : Study of a Male Nude, Metropolitan Museum of Art, New York (url)

== See also ==
- List of painters in the Web Gallery of Art
- List of sculptors in the Web Gallery of Art
