= 1709 in art =

Events from the year 1709 in art.

== Events ==
- The Baroque church of Santa María Magdalena, Seville, is completed.

== Paintings ==
- Paolo Baronni – Frescoes in the Basilica of St Denis.
- Giuseppe Maria Crespi – The Flea.
- Sir Godfrey Kneller Portraits of Admirals Sir John Jennings and Sir Stafford Fairborne.
- Kanō Tsunenobu – Portrait of a Japanese official.

== Births ==
- March 22 – Giuseppe Zais, Italian painter of landscapes (vedutisti) (died 1784)
- June 11 – Joachim Martin Falbe, German portrait painter (died 1782)
- December 24 – Johann Evangelist Holzer, Austrian-German painter (died 1740)
- date unknown
  - Giuseppe Angeli, Italian painter of the late-baroque active mainly in Venice (died 1798)
  - Philipp Hieronymus Brinckmann, German painter and engraver (died 1761)
  - John Cheere, English sculptor (died 1787)
  - Johann Michael Feuchtmayer, German stucco sculptor and plasterer (died 1772)
  - Jean Girardet, French painter of portrait miniatures (died 1778)
  - Violante Beatrice Siries, Italian painter (died 1783)

== Deaths ==
- April 2 – Giovanni Battista Gaulli, Italian painter (born 1639)
- April 5 – Roger de Piles, French painter, engraver, art critic and diplomat (born 1635)
- August 31 – Andrea Pozzo, Italian Baroque architect, decorator, stage designer, painter, and art theoretician (born 1642)
- September – Thomas Quellinus, Flemish sculptor (born 1661)
- December 7 – Meindert Hobbema, Dutch landscape painter (born 1638)
- date unknown
  - Jean-Baptiste Boyer d’Éguilles, French engraver, painter, and collector (born 1650)
  - Geronimo de Bobadilla, Spanish painter (born 1630)
  - Antonio Franchi, Italian painter active mainly in Florence and Lucca (born 1638)
  - Bartolomeo Guidobono, Italian painter, active mainly in Northern Italy (born 1654)
  - Henry Gyles, English glass painter (born 1640)
  - Johan Teyler, Dutch Golden Age painter and engraver (born 1648)
  - Yu Zhiding, Chinese landscape painter during the Qing Dynasty (born 1647)
