= Portrait of Martin Luther (Lucas Cranach the Elder) =

Paintings from the workshop of Lucas Cranach the Elder

Portrait of Martin Luther may refer to any oil painting from a series of portrayals of Martin Luther by Lucas Cranach the Elder. That artist and his studio produced countless painted and printed portraits of Luther and it is often difficult to determine to what extent the paintings are autograph works. They often formed a diptych with a portrait of Luther's wife Katharina von Bora or his close associate Philipp Melanchthon.

Cranach was a close friend and follower of Luther who was also active in Wittenberg. In addition to the portraits, Cranach also produced designs for the woodcuts for the first edition of the reformer's German translation of the New Testament in 1522. Otherwise, however, his choice of motifs cannot be said to have been influenced by his Lutheran faith. He painted mythological and biblical motifs, images of saints and executed many portraits – even of religious opponents such as Cardinal Albert of Brandenburg.

The 1526 work from the series in the Nationalmuseum, Stockholm is accompanied by one of von Bora from 1527. Both were acquired by the museum from the parish of Söderfors in 1887. Their naturalistic background enables them to concentrate on the subjects' portrayal and to emphasize their hard, serious expressions. The spirit of the Reformation is clear in the images' lack of flattery and expression of a strict ethical stance.

The 1532 work from the series in the National Gallery of Denmark is signed with a winged dragon. It was acquired for the royal collections as early as 1674. Another two of Luther from 1529 and 1543 are in the Uffizi, paired with one of von Bora and one of Melanchton respectively.

== Selected works ==
Image	Title	Date	Support	Format (cm)	Collection
	Portrait of Martin Luther	1525	oak	40 x 26,6	Bristol City Museum and Art Gallery
	Martin Luther (1483–1546); Katharina von Bora (1499–1552)	1526 c. 1527	beechwood	39 x 26; 39 x 26	Nationalmuseum, Stockholm
	Martin Luther	1528	panel	37,4 x 23,6	Niedersächsisches Landesmuseum, Hannover
	Martin Luther; Katharina Luther (1499–1552), nee von Bora	1529	beechwood	37,9 x 24,4; 38,2 x 24,9	Ducal Museum Gotha
	Martin Luther and his wife Katharina von Bora	1529	beechwood	36 x 23; 36 x 23	Hessisches Landesmuseum, Darmstadt
	Portrait of Martin Luther; Portrait of Katerina von Bora (wife of Martin Luther)	1529	panel	36,5 x 23; 37 x 23	Uffizi, Florence
	Portrait of Martin Luther; Portrait of Katharina von Bora	c. 1529	panel	38.3 x 24; 38.2 x 24.7	Museo Poldi Pezzoli, Milan
	Portrait of Martin Luther	1532	panel	37 x 23,5	Statens Museum for Kunst, Copenhagen
	Martin Luther (1483–1546) (workshop)	probably 1532	panel	33,3 x 23,2	Metropolitan Museum of Art, New York (since 1955)
	Portrait of Martin Luther	probably 1532	beechwood	19 x 15	Historisches Museum, Regensburg
	Martin Luther as Knight George (Junker Jörg); Portrait of Katharina von Bora (workshop)	1537	beechwood	51 x 36 51 x 36	Muskegon Museum of Art, Muskegon
	Portrait of Martin Luther; Portrait of Philip Melanchton	1543	panel	21 x 16; 21 x 16	Uffizi, Florence
	Portrait of Martin Luther (Pendant of Philipp Melanchthon)	1543	beechwood	20,8 x 15,2	Gemäldegalerie Alte Meister, Kassel
