= Noletti =

Noletti is a surname. Notable people with the surname include:

- Francesco Noletti (1611–1654), Italian painter
- Gilberto Noletti (1941–2024), Italian footballer
