= Sébastien Barras =

French painter and engraver

- Born: 1653
- Died: 1703 (aged 49–50)
- Occupations: Painter and engraver

Sébastien Barras (1653–1703) was a French painter and engraver.

== Life ==
Barras was born at Aix-en-Provence, in 1653. He was a pupil of Boyer d'Aguilles, and studied for some time in Rome. The first edition of the Boyer d'Aguilles Collection, published in 1709, contained 27 mezzotints by Barras, which were replaced by plates engraved by Jacobus Coelemans in the second edition. He also engraved a portrait of Lazarus Maharkysus, a physician of Antwerp, after Anthony van Dyck.

He died at Aix in 1703.
