= Francesco Noletti =

Italian still-life painter

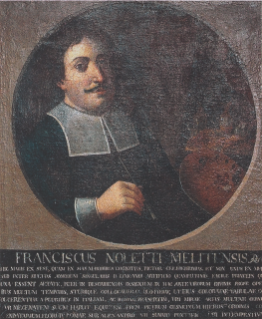
Commemorative Portrait of Francesco Noletti (anonymous)

Francesco Noletti, also known as Francesco Fieravino (1611 – 4 December 1654) was an Italian still-life painter. He was often referred to by his nickname, Il Maltese.

== Biography ==
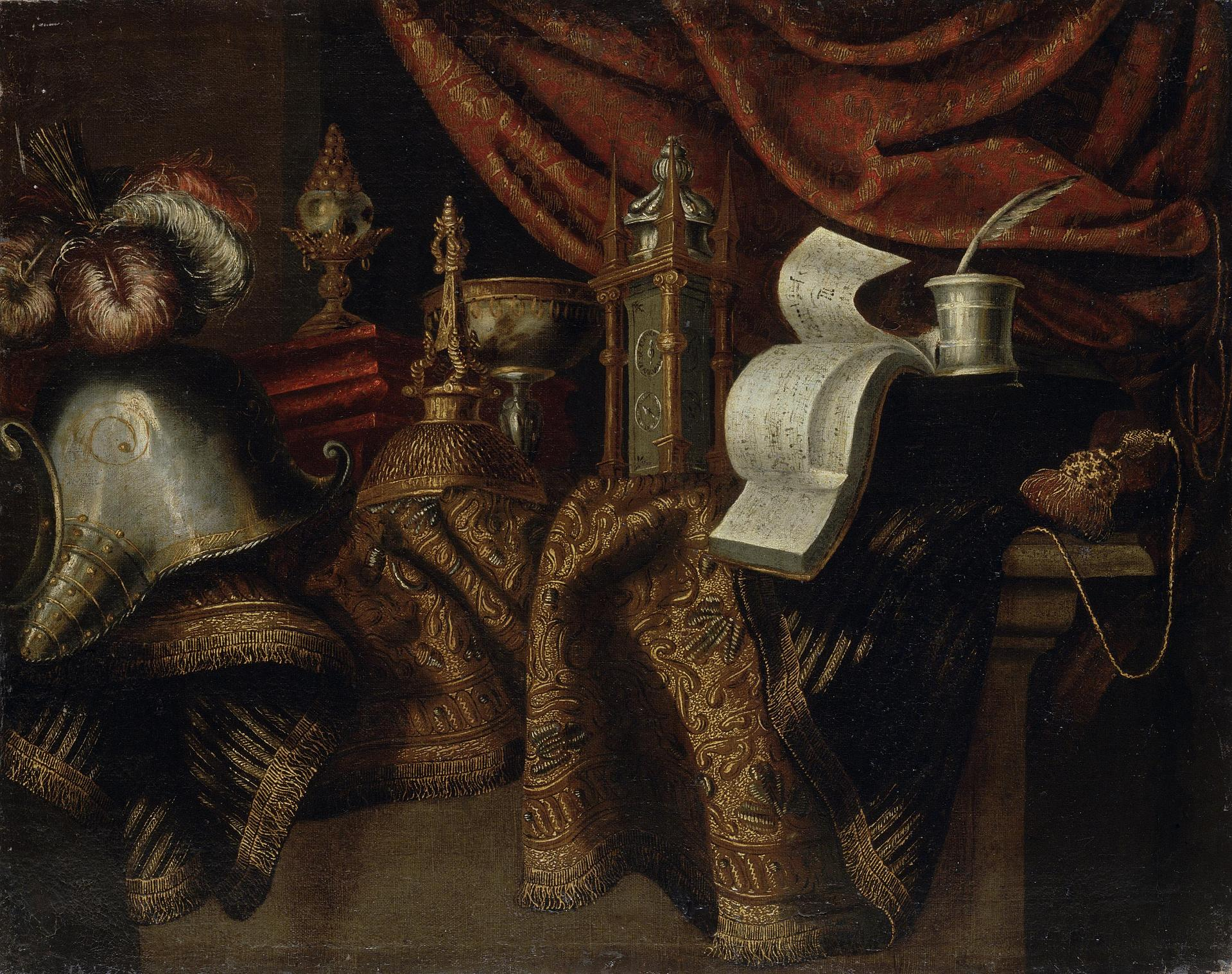
Still-life with Helmet

A native of Malta (born possibly in Valletta), he was first recorded working in Rome during the time of Pope Alexander VII; painting still-lifes with Pietro Cesarini, a Knight of Malta, as his patron. Long confused with an artist named Benedetto Fioravanti, who painted similar still-lifes, his works were also often attributed to an otherwise unknown painter named Francesco Fieravino. It was only in this century that the discovery of an anonymous portrait at the University of Malta led to the firm establishment of his identity.

He is mentioned for the first time in the inventories of the Barberini family, between 1631 and 1636, as the creator of "six oil papers with various flowers". As late as 1661, a certain "Francesco Maltese" is mentioned as a specialist in paintings with ornate carpets. In the absence of signed works, two etchings published in 1703 by Jacobus Coelemans served as the basis for establishing his style.

It has been certified that, as of 1642, he had settled permanently in Rome; first on the Via Margutta, then on the Via Laurina, where he worked with Andrea Sacchi and got married. His death certificate from 1654 describes him as a "famous painter".

His works were much sought after during his lifetime, but he was soon forgotten after his death. He was briefly referenced by Joshua Reynolds in his Catalogue of Famous Painters, as a "painter of vases, instruments, carpets and still-lifes".
