= Michael Ostendorfer =

German painter

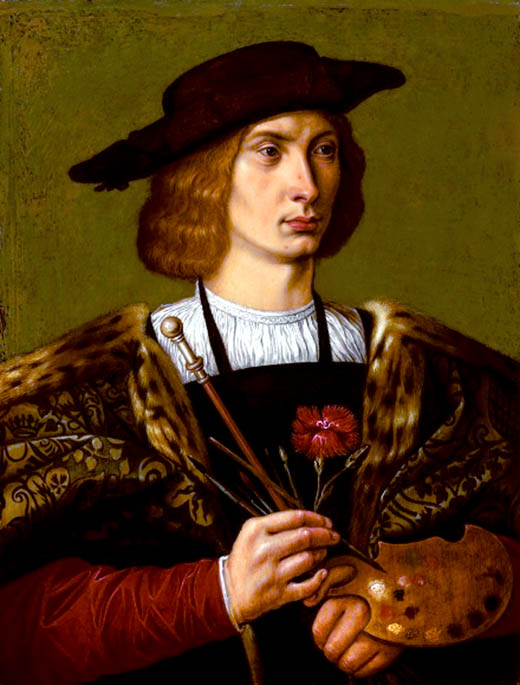
Self-portrait (date unknown)

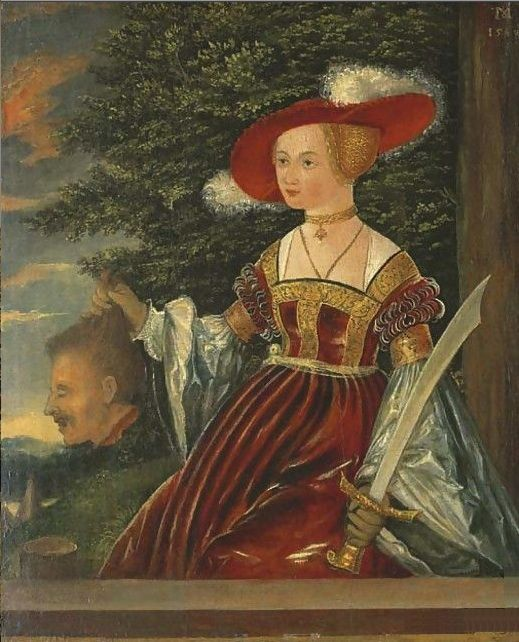
Judith and Holofernes

Michael Ostendorfer (1490/1494 – December 1559) was a German painter, graphic artist and xylographer. Stylistically, he belongs to the Danube school and probably trained with Albrecht Altdorfer.

== Biography ==
He was born in Ostendorf in Swabia, or Ostendorf in Hemau. He was employed by the Elector Palatine, Friedrich II, in Neumarkt, as a court painter. He moved to Regensburg in 1519, was married to Anna Wechin (c. 1498–1550), the daughter of a furrier, in 1528 and bought a house. During the 1520s, he worked for several printing shops. He appears to have been intermittently active as a court painter back in Neumarkt from 1535 to 1544, when Friedrich II moved to Heidelberg. At that time he was also known to be working for the printer and publisher, Hans Guldenmund. After that, there is no record of his activities until 1549, when he acquired "Bürgerrechten" (citizenship) in Regensburg, which had become Protestant in 1542.

He failed to receive a sufficient number of orders, which left him and his family in poverty. As a result, he was also deeply in debt and was often prevented from working by attacks of the gout. During this time, his wife and two of his children died. He married again, but little is known of his second wife, and they separated after only a short time. Eventually, as the result of his begging, the City Council and the Protestant community got together to provide him with some simple work that including making woodcuts of cityscapes and public events. In 1554, they finally offered him a major commission, preparing the Reformation Altar for the Neupfarrkirche, but granted him only part of the payment in advance, concerned that he would squander it. There are indications that he may have been an alcoholic.

The altar was completed in 1555 with no obvious improvement in his financial situation. A year later, he found it necessary to move into an alms house maintained by the city in the Church of St.Ignatius. When he tried to give painting lessons there, to help pay off his debt, it led to many quarrels and he was ejected for breaking the rules. He died in 1559, still in poverty and debt.

His works may be found in Prague, Budapest, London and Munich as well as at the Regensburg Museum of History. The Ostendorfer-Gymnasium in Neumarkt is named after him.
