= Jan Baptist van Fornenburgh =

Dutch painter (1585–1650)

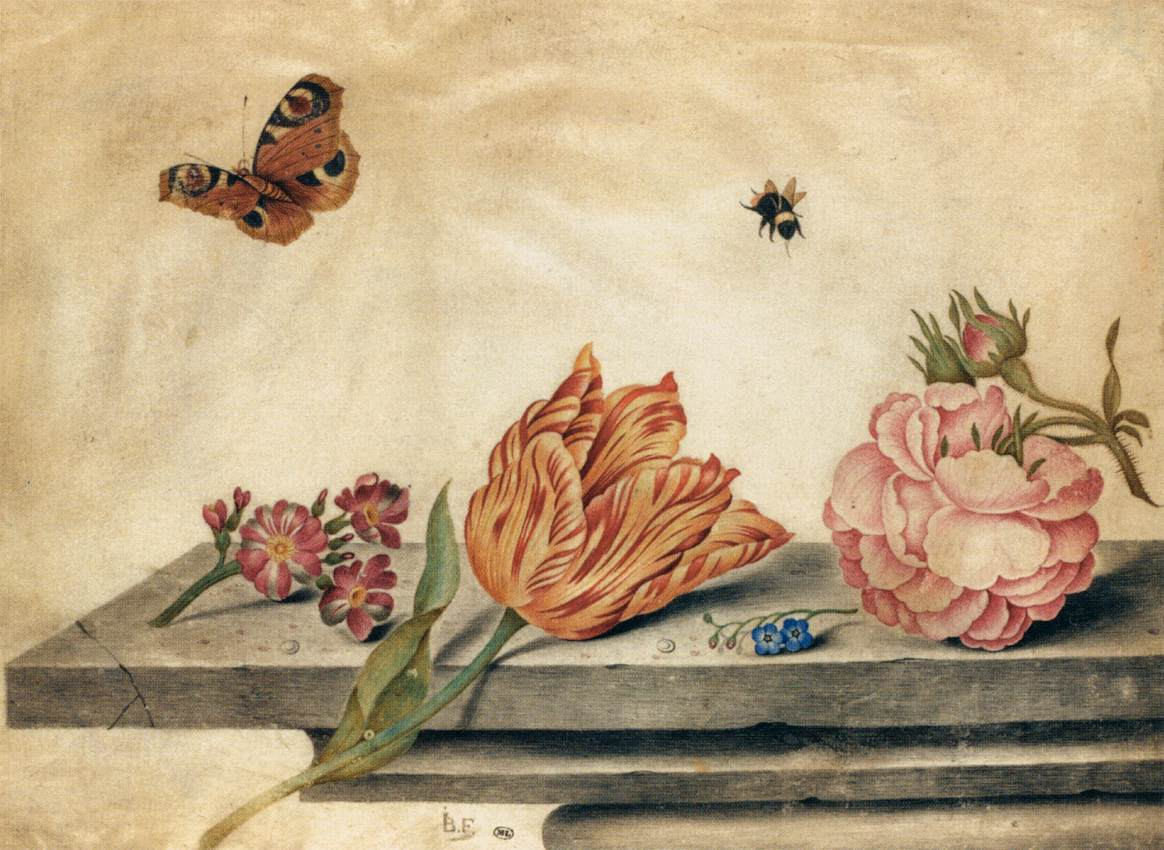
Flowers

Jan Baptist van Fornenburgh (1585 in Antwerp – 1650 in the Hague) was a Dutch Golden Age flower painter.

According to the Netherlands Institute for Art History, the artist signed his works with a monogram; sometimes "IBVF" and sometimes "IB". He worked in Amsterdam and Vianen, as well as the Hague, where he became a member of the Confrerie Pictura in 1629. He was a follower of Balthasar van der Ast and Jacob de Gheyn II.

== Work ==
In addition to flowers, van Fornenburgh painted dead birds, fruits and other objects, in oil or watercolour, on parchment.
