= Teresa Berenice Vitelli =

Italian artist (1706 – 1729)

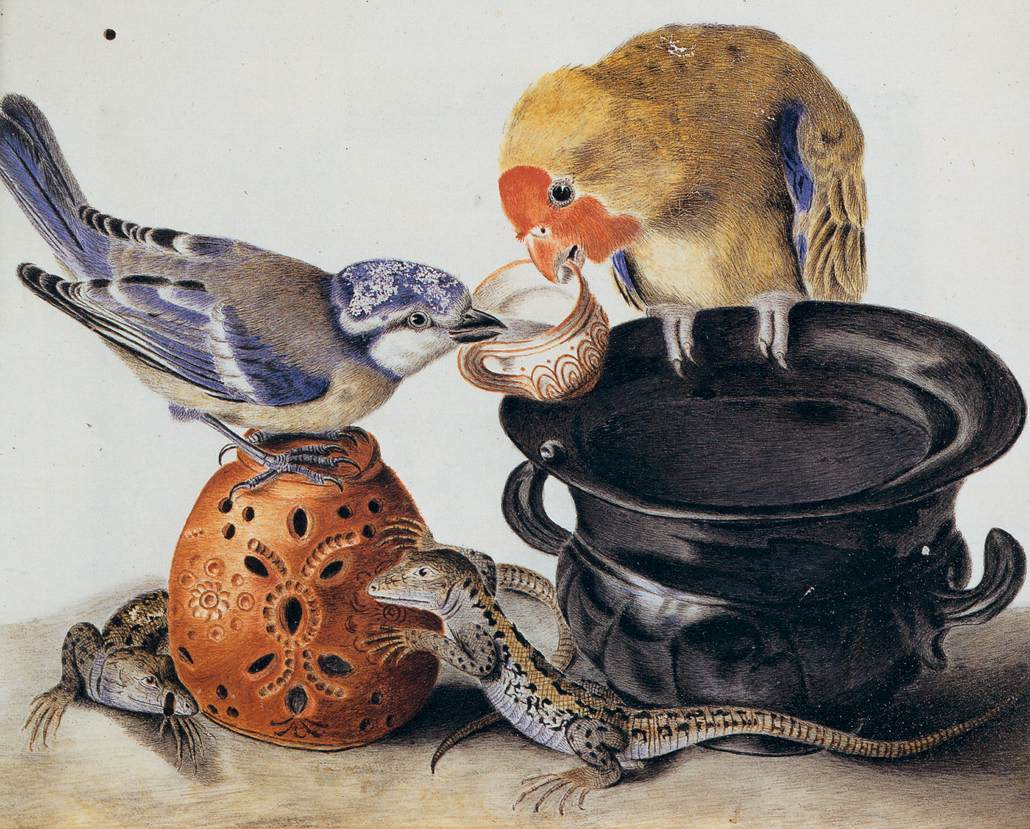
Parrot, Blue Tit, Two Lizards, and Vases, 1706

Teresa Berenice Vitelli, also known as Suor Veronica, (active 1706 – 1729) was an 18th-century Italian painter.

== Biography ==
Vitelli was born in Florence and became a Roman Catholic nun there. She is known for drawings, watercolours, and gouaches of still-life subjects, as well as copies of other masters.

Vitelli died in Florence.
