= Paolo Baronni =

Italian painter

Paolo Baronni was an Italian painter. His date of birth and death are not known.

Not much is known about Baronni's life. He is known primarily through records of his works. The Basilica of St Denis contains a trompe-l'œil painting done by Baronni around 1709.
