= Marie-Jeanne Renard du Bos =

French artist

Marie-Jeanne Renard du Bos (1701 – between 1730 and 1750) was a French engraver.

== Biography ==
She was probably born in Paris and became a pupil of Charles Dupuis. She engraved several paintings, including a painting by Francoise Basseporte of a woman at half-length stroking a rabbit, that was published in Versailles immortalisée in 1720. She was mentioned for this in Louis-Marie Prudhomme's dictionary of famous women. Prudhomme claimed the year of her death was unknown in 1830.

She probably died in Paris.

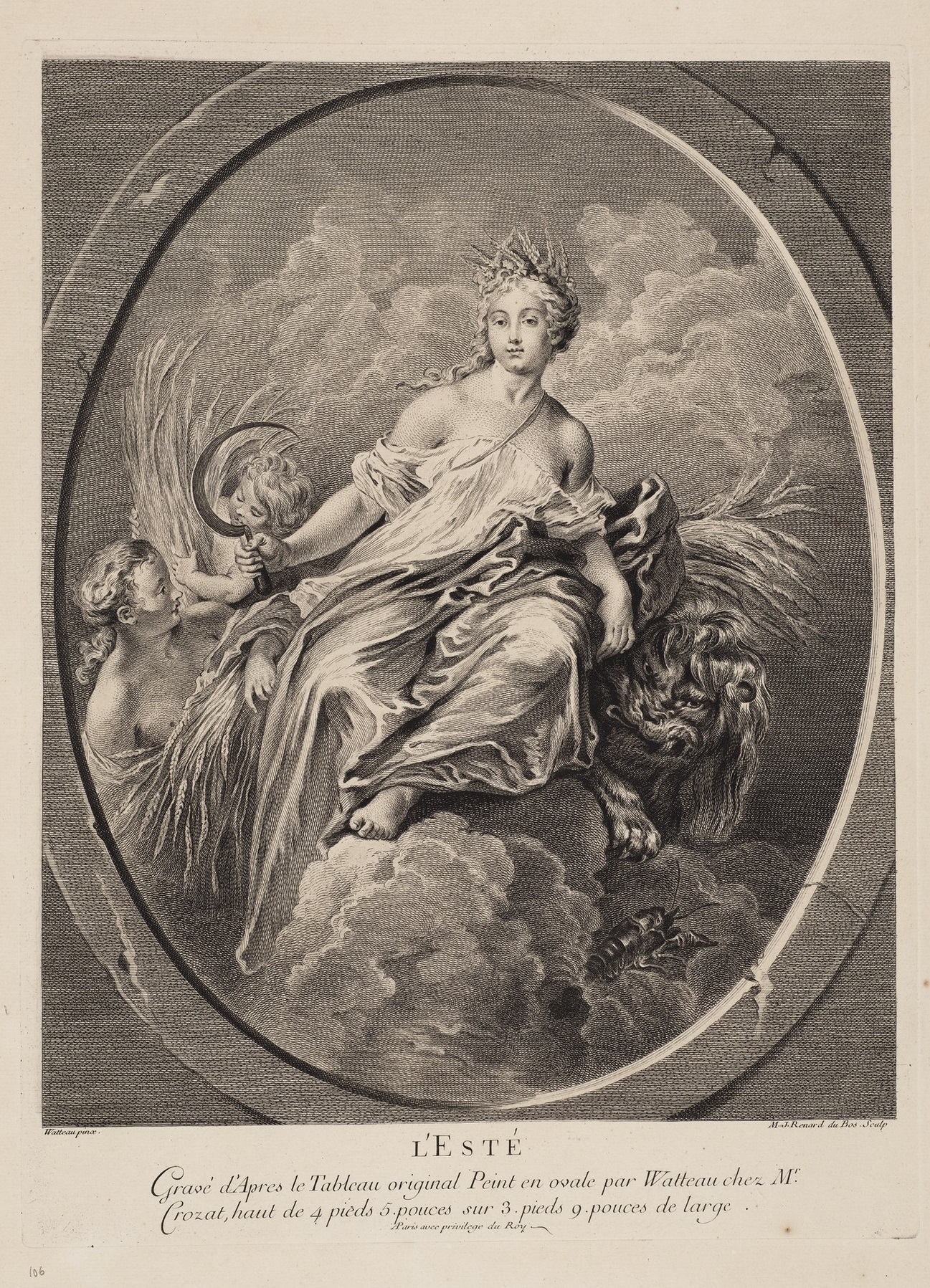
Summer (from the Crozat Seasons), after Antoine Watteau; Harvard Art Museums

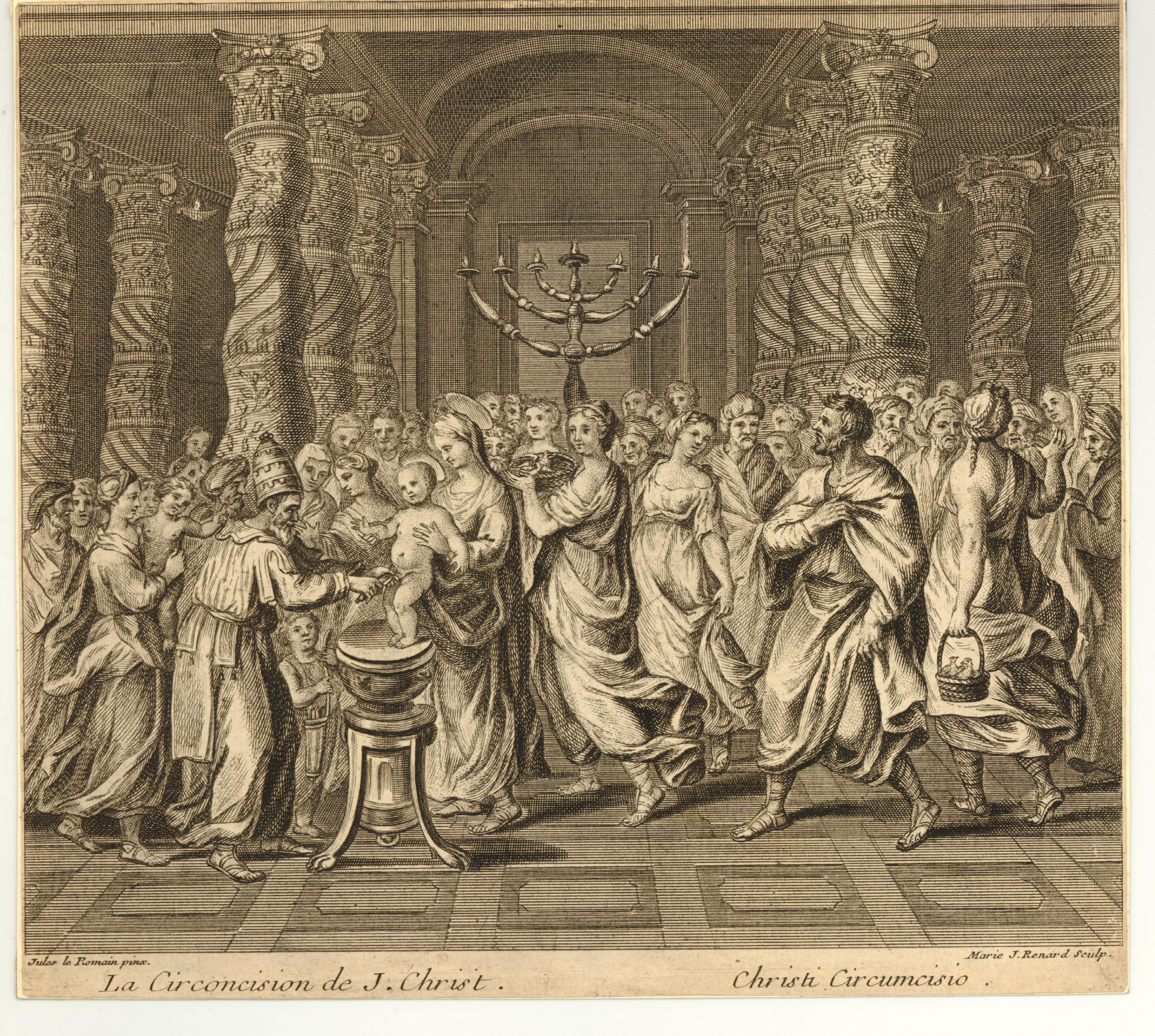
The Circumcision of Christ, after Giulio Romano; British Museum, London

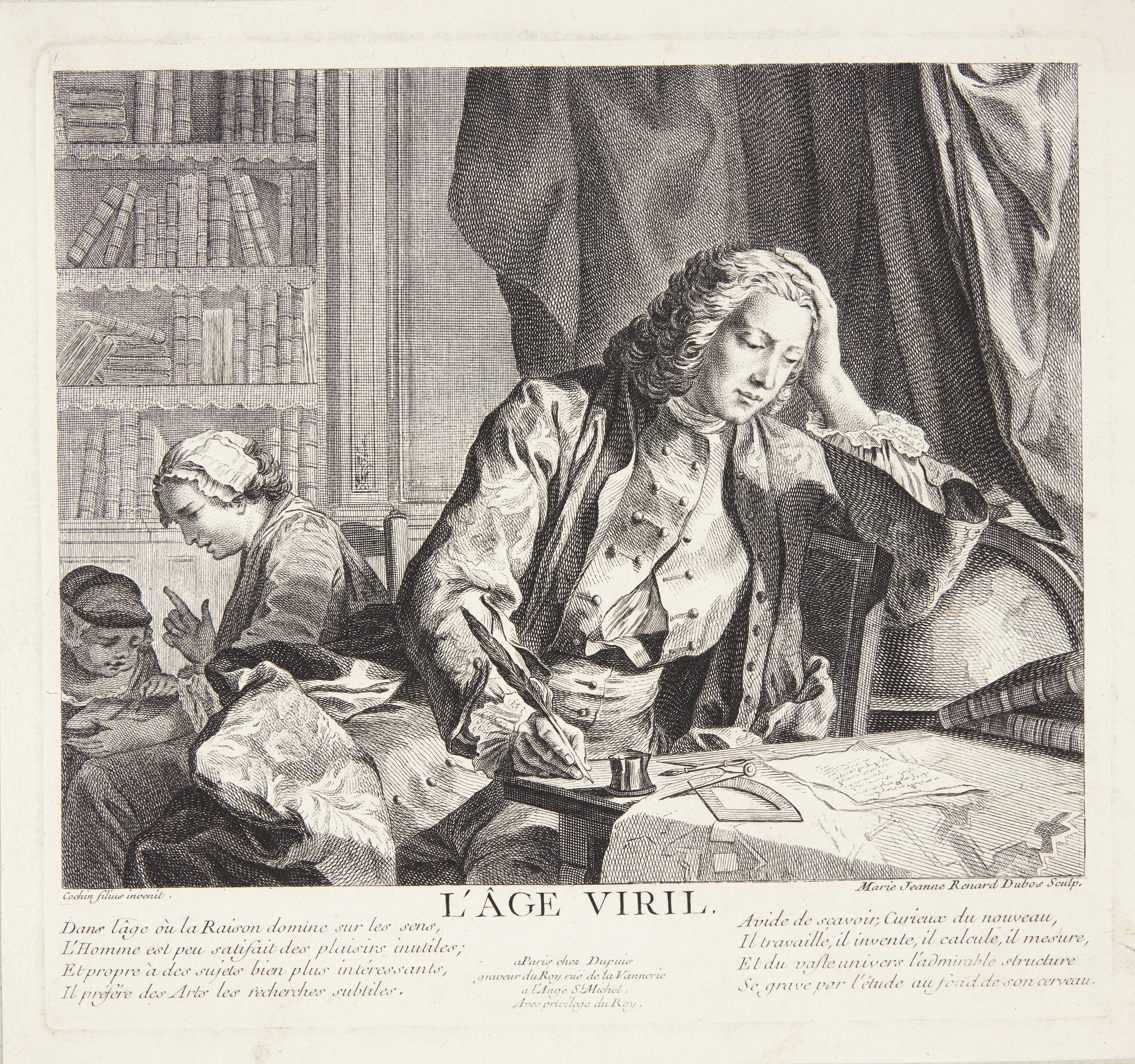
L'Age viril, after Charles-Nicolas Cochin fils; National Gallery of Denmark, Copenhagen
