= Jean-Baptiste Boyer d'Éguilles =

Nobleman and engraver

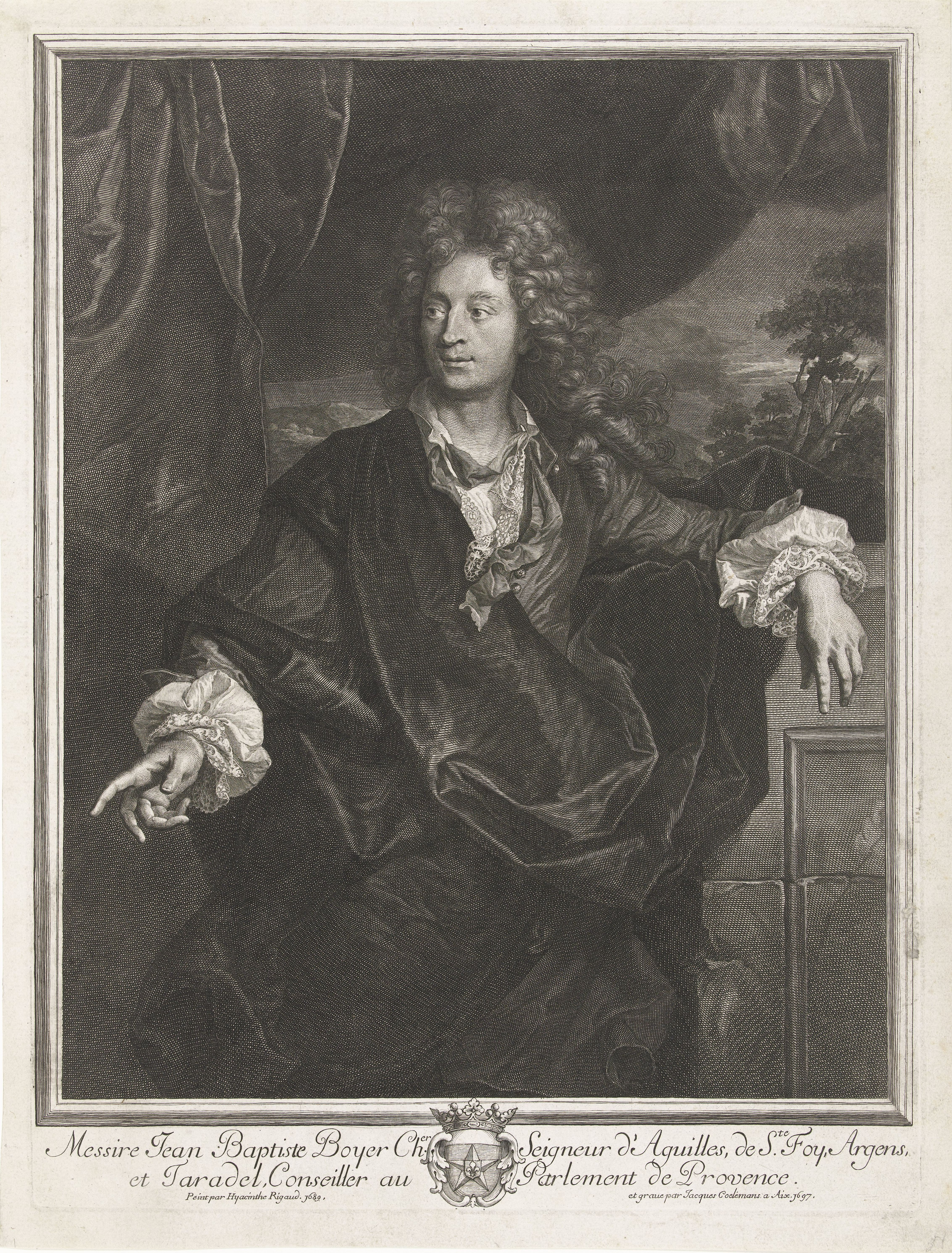
- Portrait of Jean-Baptiste Boyer d'Éguilles, engraved by Jacobus Coelemans after design by Hyacinthe Rigaud
- Born: 21 December 1650; Aix-en-Provence, France
- Died: 4 October 1709 (aged 58); Aix-en-Provence, France
- Occupation(s): Aristocrat, lawyer
- Spouse: Jeanne-Marie Surle dame d'Argens
- Children: 11

Jean-Baptiste Boyer, Marquis d'Éguilles (1650–1709) was a French aristocrat, lawyer, and engraver.

== Early life ==
Jean-Baptiste Boyer was born on 21 December 1650 in Aix-en-Provence.

== Career ==
He became procurator-general of the Parlement of Aix-en-Provence.

His love of the arts led him into an intimacy with the principal artists of his time, particularly with Pierre Paul Puget, the celebrated sculptor, with whom he went to Italy.

He amassed a large collection of pictures, sculptures, etc., and published the prints in two volumes; six of the plates were engraved by himself.

He also amused himself with painting, for which he is said to have had an excellent taste. Some of his plates are executed with the graver, the others were produced by mezzotint.

== Personal life ==
He married Jeanne-Marie Surle, Lady of Argens (circa 1650-circa 1720), on 1 April 1671. They had eleven children:

- Marie-Madeleine Boyer d'Éguilles (1672-1751).
- Vincent Boyer d'Éguilles (1673-unknown).
- Jeanne Boyer d'Éguilles (1674-unknown).
- Marie-Thérèse Boyer d'Éguilles (1675-1749).
- Julie Boyer d'Éguilles (1678-unknown).
- Elzéard Boyer d'Éguilles (1680-unknown).
- Pierre-Jean de Boyer d'Éguilles (1682-unknown).
- François Boyer d'Éguilles (1685-unknown).
- Anne Boyer d'Éguilles (1687-unknown).
- Anne Boyer d'Éguilles (1689-unknown).
- Élisabeth Boyer d'Éguilles (1691-unknown).

== Death ==
He died in Aix-en-Provence, at the age of fifty-eight.

== Engravings ==
- The Marriage of St. Catharine; after Andrea del Sarto; with the graver.
- Two figures of Christ; on one plate; the same.
- Two Landscapes; after Brecourt; the same.
- St. John the Baptist; after Manfredi; mezzotint.
- Bust of a Man; the same.
