= Regensburg Museum of History =

Museum of the history, art and culture of Regensburg and eastern Bavaria

Coordinates: 49°01′05″N 12°06′07″E

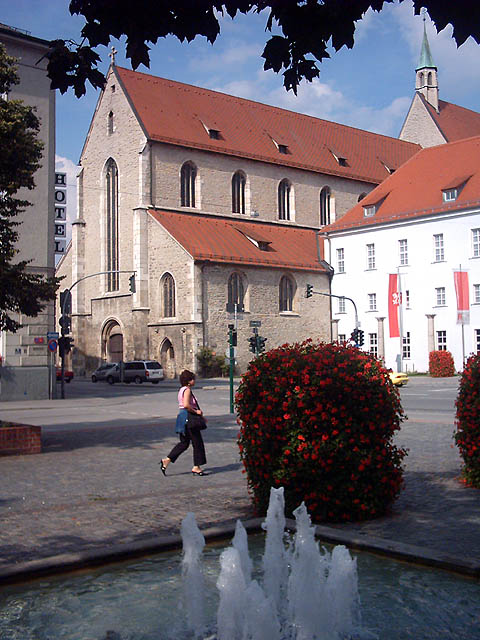
The former Minoritenkirche, housing the Museum of History (right)

The Regensburg Museum of History (Regensburg Historische Museum) currently resides in a former Minorite monastery, is a museum of the history, art and culture of Regensburg and eastern Bavaria from the Stone Age to the present day.

The former monastery of St Salvator, located in the city's Dachauplatz district, was founded in 1221 by the Bishop of Regensburg Konrad IV of Frontenhausen, Count Otto VIII of Bavaria, and King Henry VII. The three-naved basilica church was considered the largest church of the order in southern Germany until its closure in 1799.

The church and most of its monastic buildings survived, with the monastic buildings converted as barracks and billets for the Bavarian Army, and the church as a customs hall, a drill hall and a hotel until it became the location of the Regensburg Museum of History in 1931.

It is run by the city of Regensburg.
