= Jacobus Coelemans =

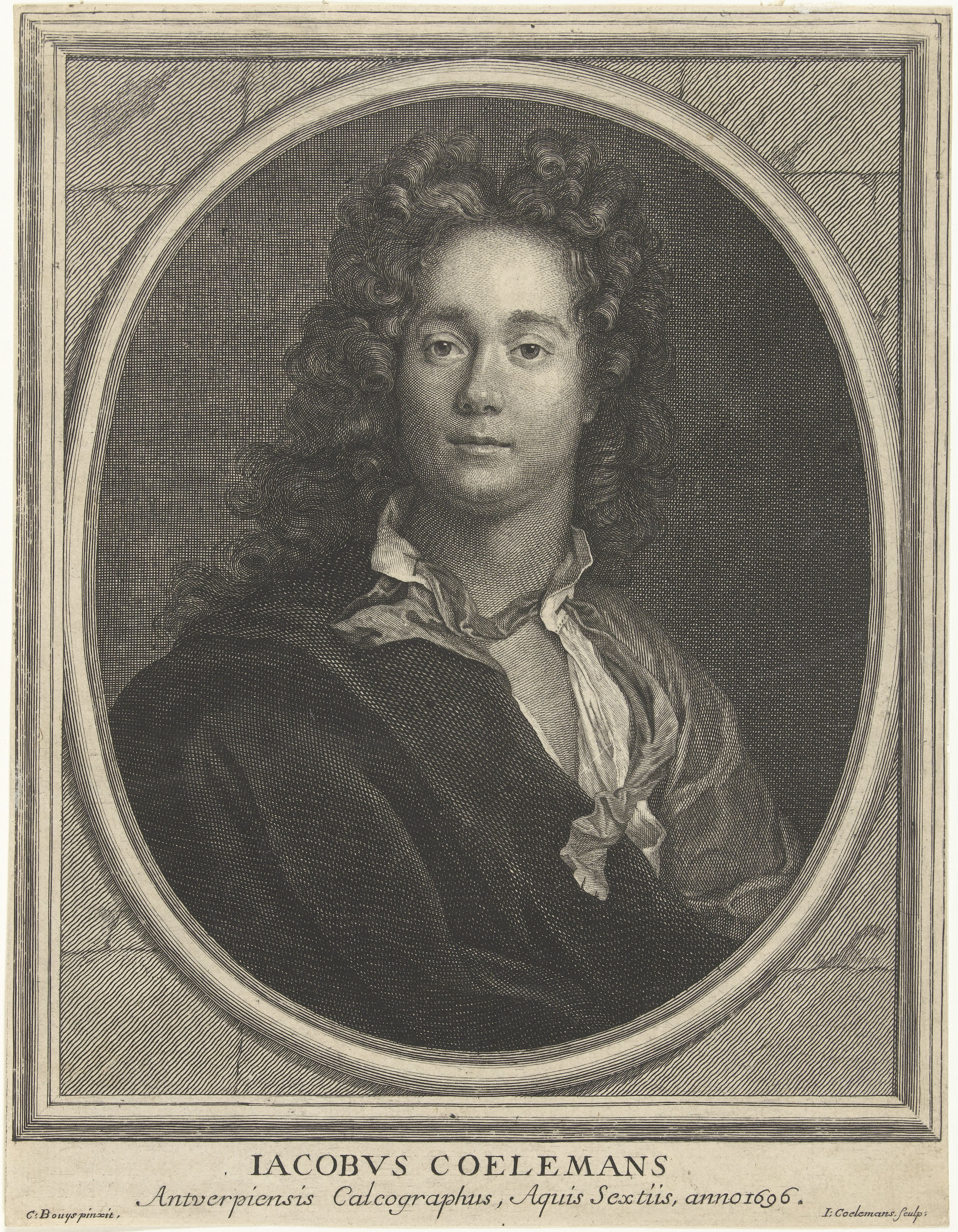
Portrait of Jacobus Coelemans, engraved by himself after a design by Claude Bouys

Jacobus Coelemans or Jacob Coelemans, known in France as Jacques Coelemans (Antwerp, 23 August 1654 – Aix-en-Provence, 11 February 1732) was a Flemish engraver and printmaker, known for his reproductive prints after famous painters and portraits. He trained in his native Antwerp and later moved to Aix-en-Provence in France where he worked for the remainder of his life.

== Life ==
Jacob Coelemans was registered as a pupil of Frederik Bouttats the Younger at the Antwerp Guild of Saint Luke in the Guild year 1672–1673. Bouttats was a print artist, art dealer (person), painter and mezzotint artist from an extensive Antwerp dynasty of artists. He was never registered as a master in the Guild of Saint Luke of Antwerp. On 20 October 1680 he joined the 'Sodaliteit van de Bejaerde Jongmans', a fraternity for bachelors established by the Jesuit order.

He must have enjoyed a certain reputation as he moved in 1690 to Aix-en-Provence in France to which he was called by Jean-Baptiste Boyer d’Éguilles. His patron was Attorney General of the Parliament of Provence and a famous art collector and scholar. Boyer d'Aguilles commissioned him to engrave his entire art collection. He was thereby completing the work which was commenced by the French engraver Sébastien Barras and Boyer d'Aguilles himself, who was also an amateur engraver.

He died in Aix-en-Provence on 11 February 1732.

== Work ==
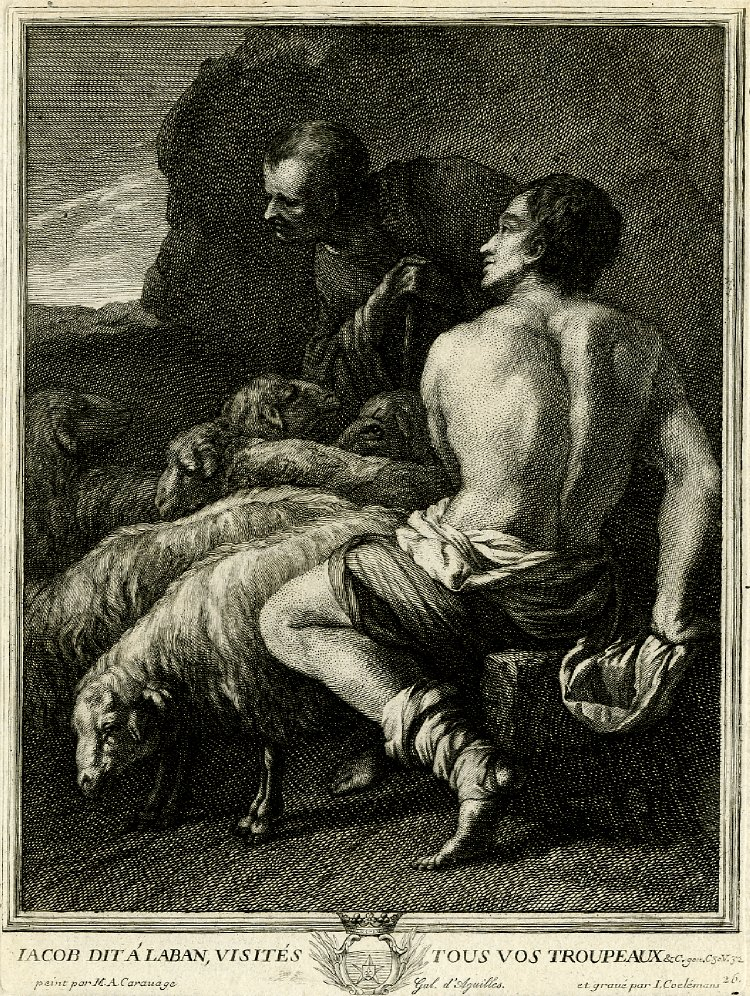
Jacob reproaching Laban, after Caravaggio

Coelemans worked as an engraver and etcher who mainly produced reproductive prints after paintings made by other artists. The commission by Boyer d'Aguilles required him to reproduce paintings in all genres. He was a versatile printmaker who was able to complete the commission successfully.

The plates that he executed for Boyer d'Aguilles were published after his patron's death by Coelemans, in a folio volume containing 118 plates, under the title Recueil des plus beaux tableaux du cabinet de messire J.-B. Boyer, chev.sgr. d'Aguilles, conseiller au parlement de Provence; à Aix, chez Jacques Coelemans, marchand et graveur en taille-douce. Pierre-Jean Mariette published a second edition in 1744, adding a note on the former owner of the gallery and an explanation of the paintings reproduced. A third edition was printed by Brother Basan, but the plates were too worn to provide good proofs. Most of the engravings by Sébastien Barras and those of Boyer d'Aguilles are missing from these two editions.

He executed his engravings in a vigorous style, with sometimes too much black. Almost all of his prints show a judicious sense of line and a good understanding of chiaroscuro. He was scrupulous in his attempt to accurately reproduce the work of the Flemish, French or Italian masters in the Boyer d'Aguilles' collection. He is generally recognized for the brilliance of his palette.
