= Solly =

Solly is a given name, nickname (often of Solomon) and a surname. It may refer to:

== Given name ==
- Solly Granatstein, American television producer
- Solly Krieger (1909–1964), American world champion middleweight boxer
- Solly Afrika Mapaila, 21st century South African politician
- Solly Pernick, American stage technician
- Solly Shoke (born 1956), South African general

== Nickname ==
- Solly Drake (born 1930), American retired Major League Baseball player
- Solly Hemus (born 1923), American retired Major League Baseball player, manager and coach
- Solly Hofman (1882–1956), American Major League Baseball player
- Solomon Joel (1865–1931), English financier who made his fortune in South Africa
- Solly March (born 1994), English footballer
- Solly Sherman (1917–2010), American National Football League quarterback
- Solly Smith (1871–1933), Mexican-American world featherweight boxing champion
- Solly Tyibilika (1979–2011), South African rugby union footballer
- Solly Zuckerman, Baron Zuckerman (1904–1993), British public servant, zoologist and operational research pioneer

== Surname ==
- Chris Solly (born 1991), English footballer
- Edward Solly (1786–1844), English merchant and art collector
- Edward Solly (chemist) (1819–1886), English chemist and antiquary, son of the art collector
- Edward Walter Solly (1882–1966), English cricketer
- Elmer Edward Solly (1945-2007), American convicted of manslaughter, fugitive for 27 years
- George Solly (1855–1930), English cricketer and solicitor
- Henry Solly (1813–1903), English social reformer
- Isaac Solly (1769–1853), London merchant, brother of the art collector Edward Solly
- Jon Solly (born 1963), English former long-distance runner
- Robert Solly (1859–1932), Australian politician

== See also ==
- Sollie (disambiguation)
