= Edward Solly (disambiguation) =

Edward Solly (1786–1844) was an English merchant and art collector.

Edward Solly may also refer to:

- Edward Solly (chemist) (1819–1886), English chemist and antiquary, son of the art collector
- Edward Walter Solly (1882–1966), English cricketer
- Elmer Edward Solly (1945–2007), American convicted killer
