= Lady and Her Cook =

Painting by Pieter de Hooch

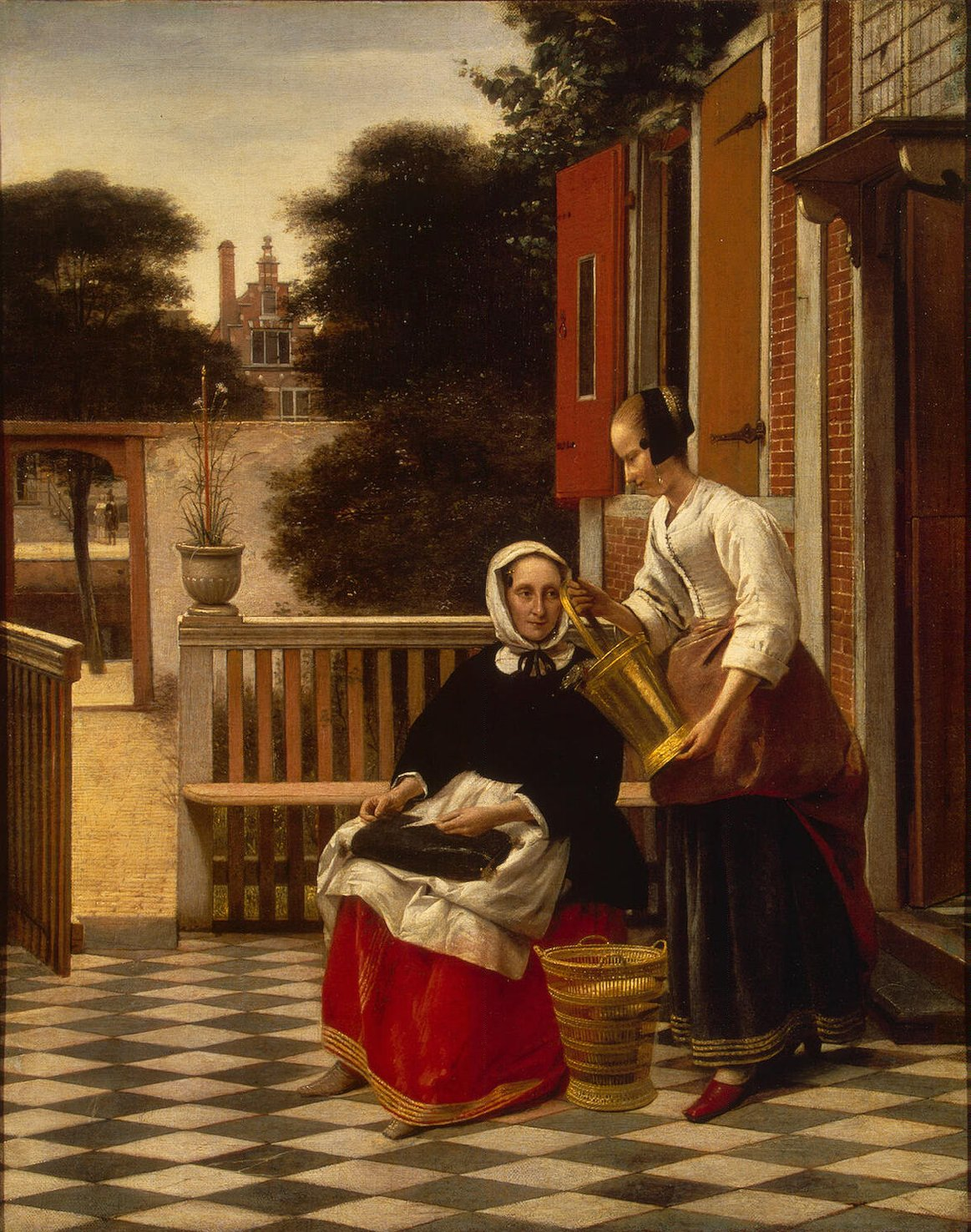
- Artist: Pieter de Hooch
- Year: c. 1660
- Medium: Oil on canvas
- Dimensions: 53 cm × 42 cm (21 in × 17 in)
- Location: Hermitage Museum; St. Petersburg

Lady and Her Cook is an oil-on-canvas painting by the Dutch painter Pieter de Hooch, created c. 1660. It is part of the collection of the Hermitage Museum, in St. Petersburg.

This painting was documented by Hofstede de Groot in 1908, who wrote:

41. LADY AND HER COOK. Sm. Suppl. 3.; de G. 75. In the middle of the little fore-court, paved with blue and white tiles, of a house on the right, sits an elderly lady, facing half-right. She wears a black jacket, a red skirt, and a white apron; she has .a green cushion on her lap and a letter in her hand, with a basket of needlework beside her.

A servant-girl, dressed in a white bodice and a violet skirt tucked up over a blue petticoat, has come out of the house-door on the right and shows her some fish in a brass pail. To the left, through the half-opened door of a trellis separating the court from the front garden, a brick path leads to a door in the wall opening on a canal. On the opposite side of it is the entrance to a house, before which a young couple are walking. Farther to the right by the canal is a gabled house, which is visible between a tree on the canal bank and a bush in the garden, and overtops the garden-wall. The picture dates from 1658-60. It is a superb work, very warm in tone; it stands about midway between the Rothschild picture (295) and that belonging to Lady Wantage (297); it reminds one also of Lord Strafford's picture (299), and of the picture in the National Gallery, London (291).

Canvas, 21 inches by 16 1/2 inches. Mentioned by Waagen, p. 190. Sale. Mont de Piété, at Paris, 1808 (about 1100 francs, La Fontaine). Sold soon after to the Tsar Alexander I., for the Hermitage, where it was hung in 1810.

It is now located in the Hermitage at St. Petersburg, No. 860 in the 1901 catalogue.

== See also ==
- List of paintings by Pieter de Hooch
