= Albert of Brandenburg as Saint Jerome =

1527 painting by Lucas Cranach the Elder

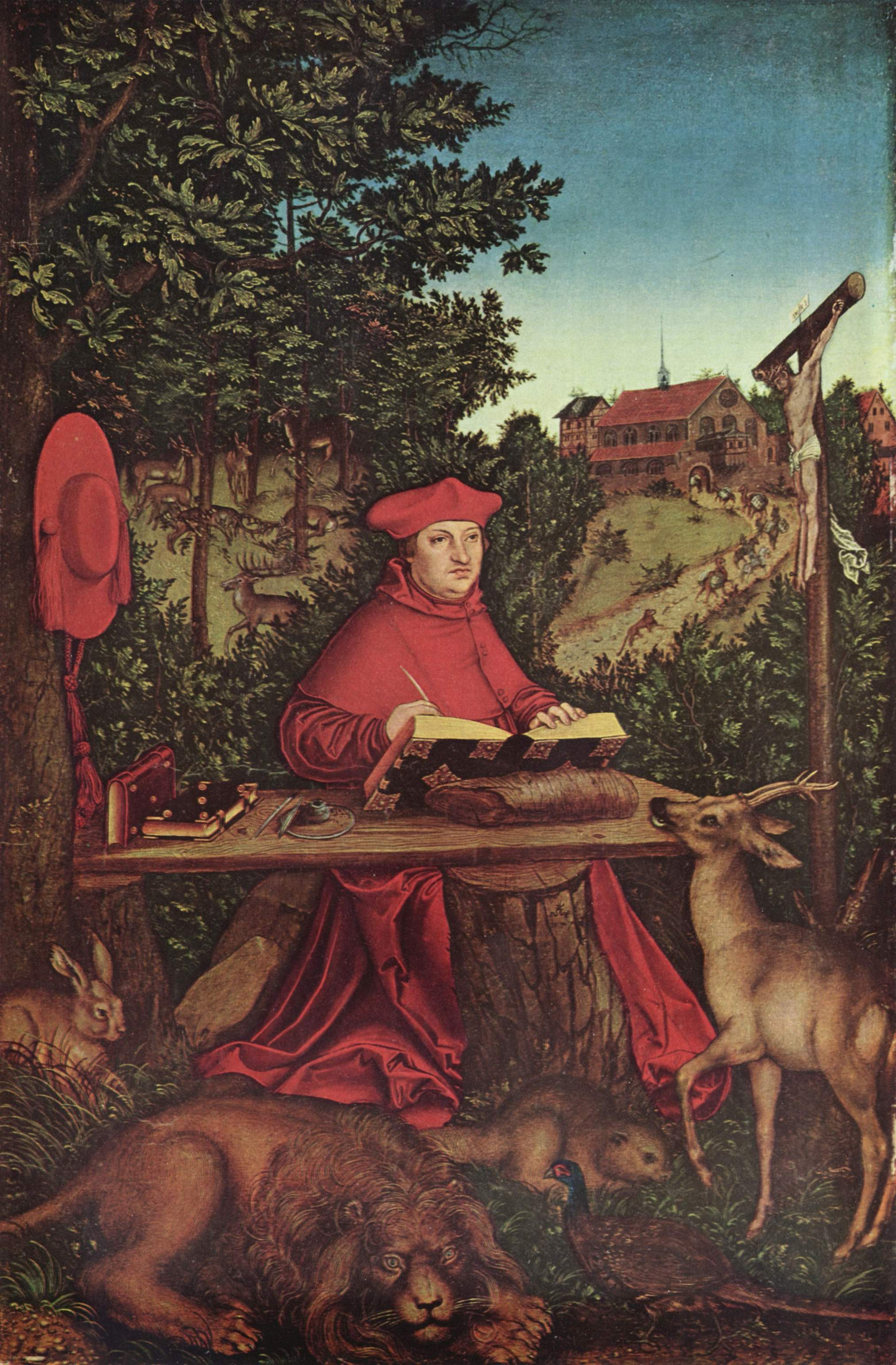

Albert of Brandenburg as Saint Jerome is a 1527 oil on panel painting by Lucas Cranach the Elder, who was a Protestant but also worked for Catholic patrons. It shows Albert of Brandenburg. It and the Solly Madonna were bought by the Kingdom of Prussia in 1821 as part of Edward Solly's collection and are both now in the Gemäldegalerie in Berlin.

== Work ==
The work was one of about ten portrait commissions from Cranach by Albert, including at least three other surviving works showing Albert as Saint Jerome (a 1525 one now in the Hessisches Landesmuseum in Darmstadt, a 1527 one in John and Mable Ringling Museum of Art in Sarasota and a c.1527 one in a private collection). All four of them show Jerome's lion, whilst in two of them Jerome is in the wasteland and two in his study, both common motifs during the Renaissance.

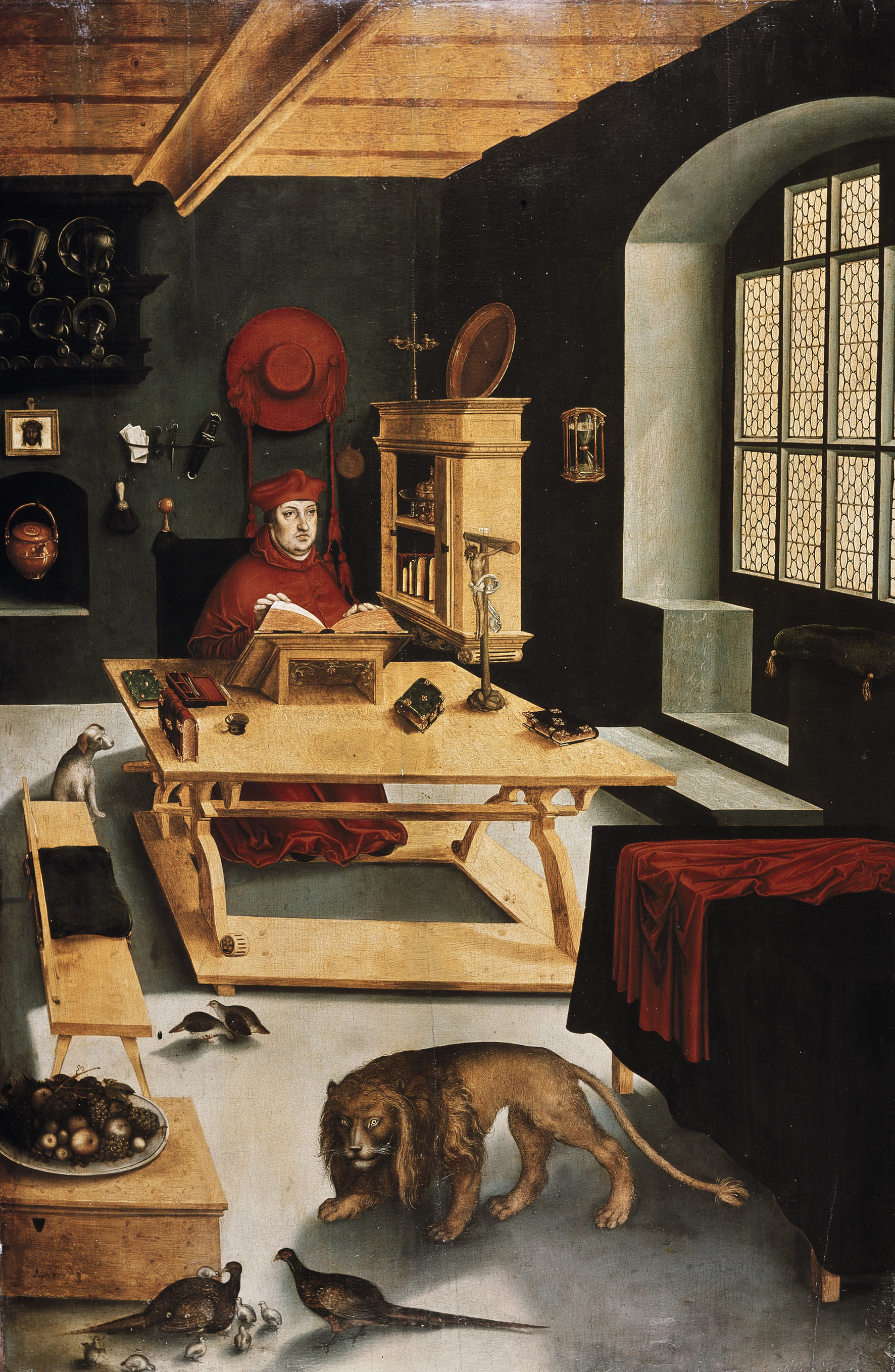
Albert of Brandenburg, Archbishop of Mainz, as Saint Jerome in his Study, Hessisches Landesmuseum Darmstadt, 1525, 116,5 x 77,5 cm.

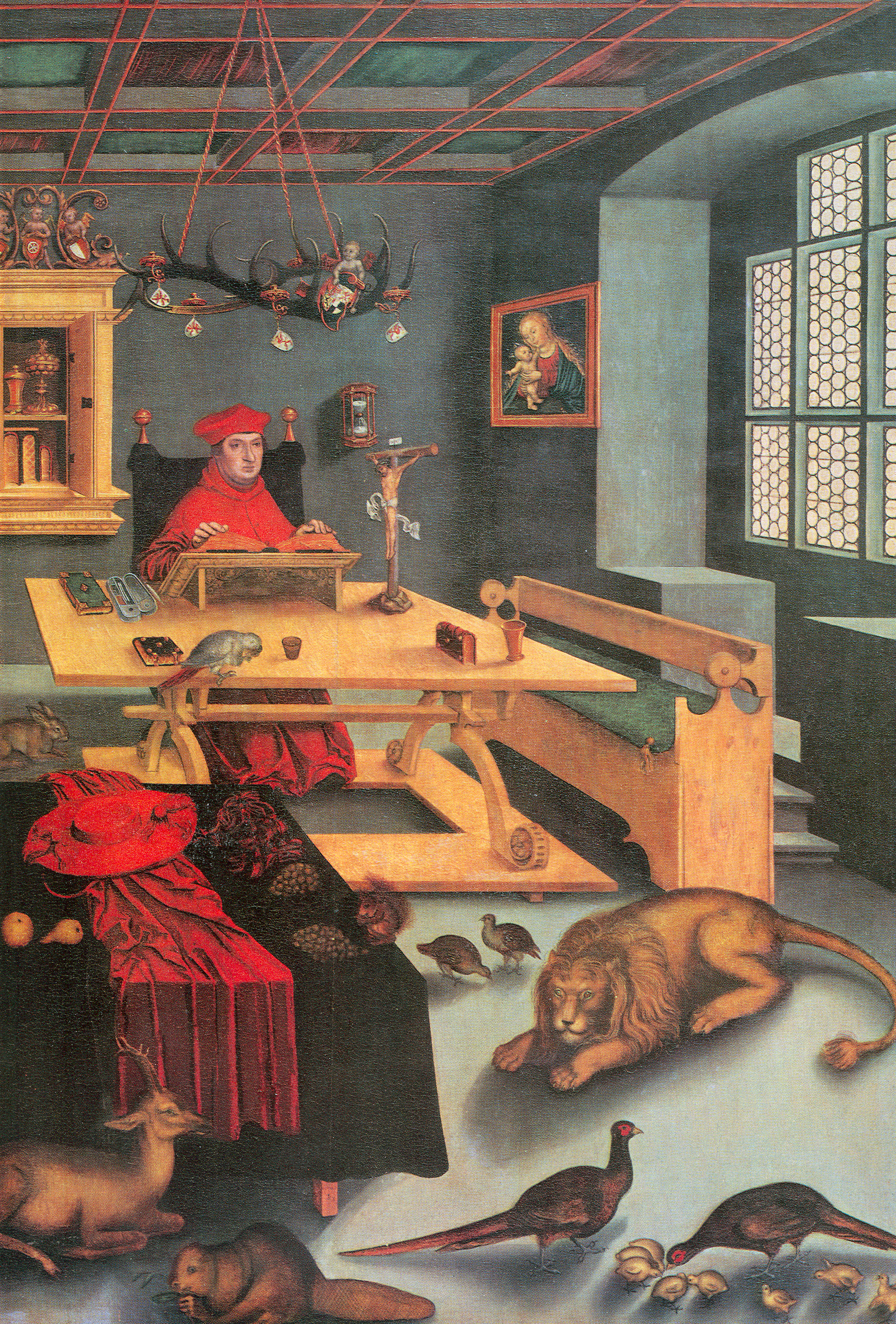
Cardinal Albert of Brandenburg as Saint Jerome, 1526, 114,9 x 89,1, cm, John and Mable Ringling Museum of Art in Sarasota.

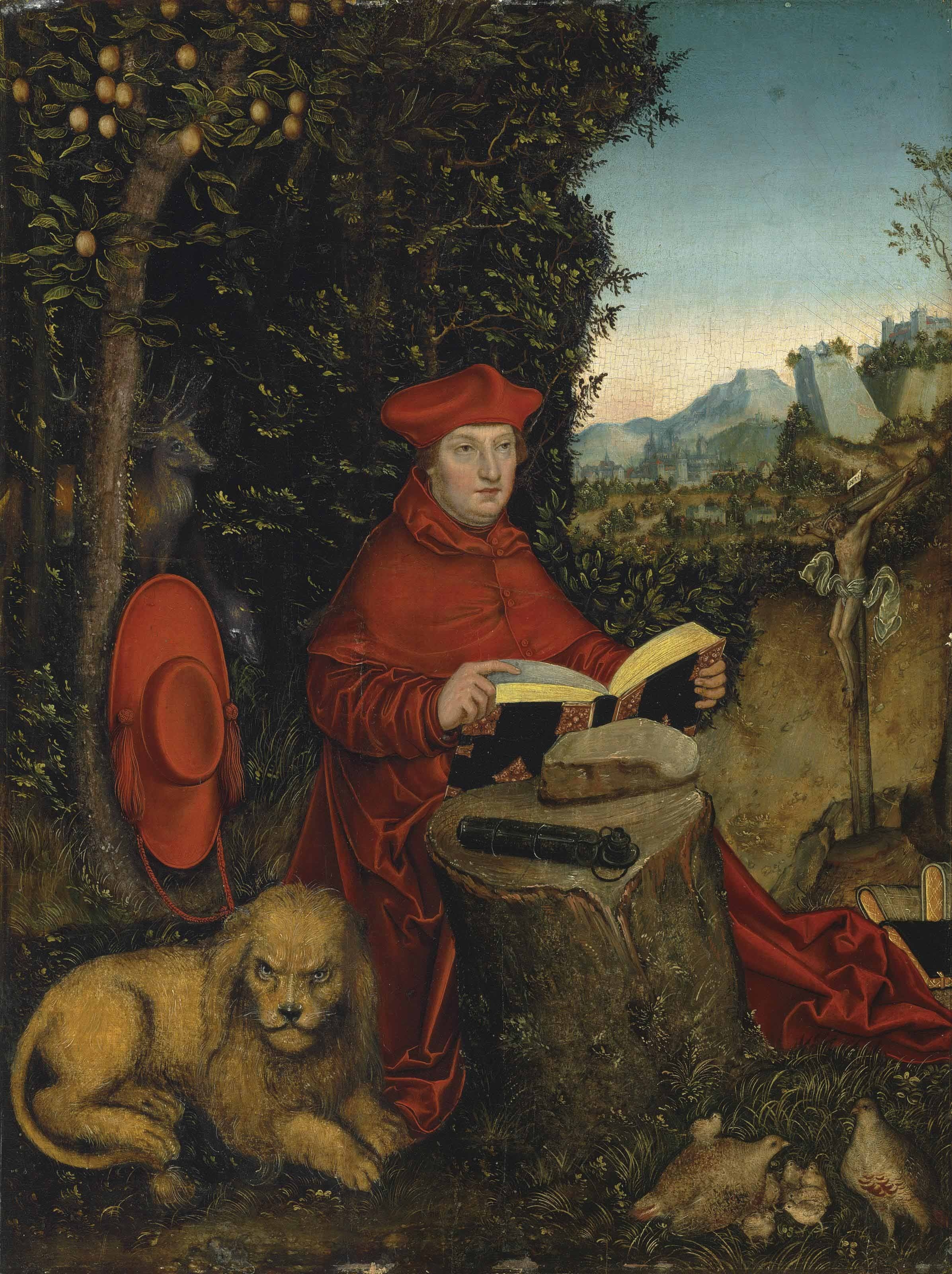
Albert of Brandenburg as Saint Jerome in the Wilderness, private collection, circa 1527.

There are also a number of half-length portraits of the cardinal, for example in the Hermitage Museum in Saint Petersburg (1526), Jagdschloss Grunewald in Berlin (after 1529) and the Landesmuseum in Mainz (1543), whilst there is also Albert with Christ on the Cross (Alte Pinakothek, Munich), part of Cranach's large series of crucifixion images.

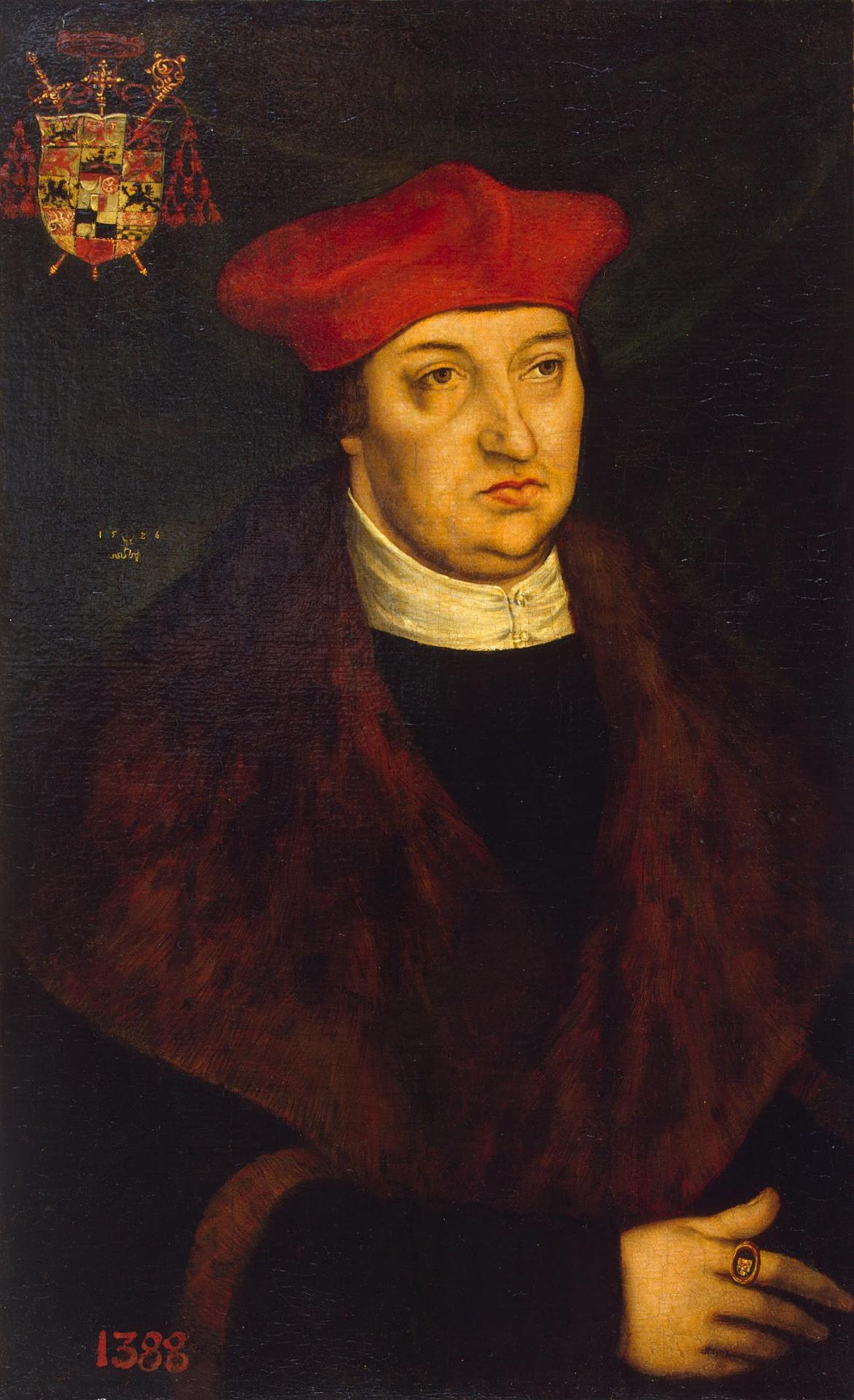
Portrait of Cardinal Albert of Brandenburg, Hermitage Museum, 40 x 24,5 cm, 1526.

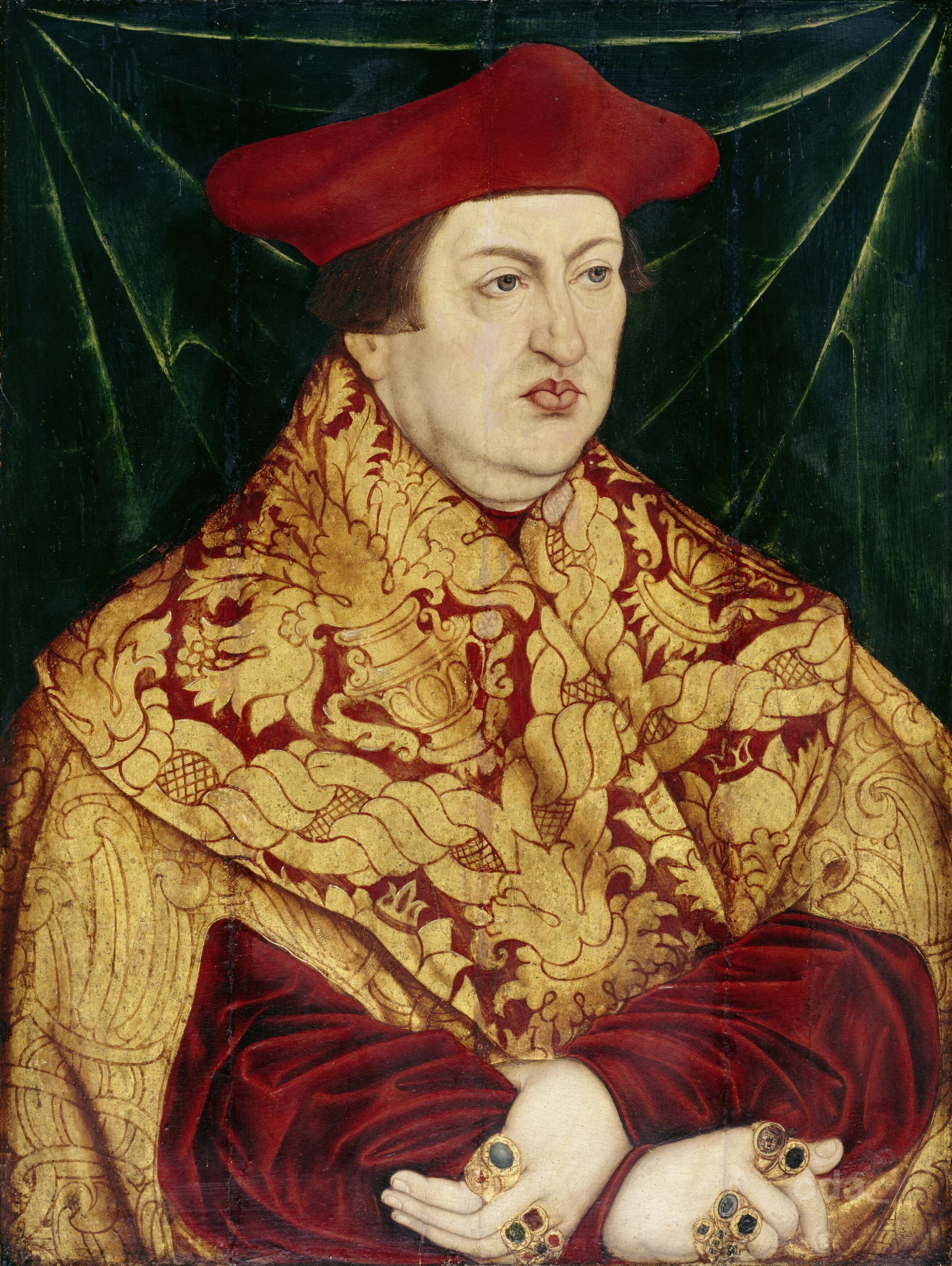
Portrait of Cardinal Albert of Brandenburg, Jagdschloss Grunewald, post 1529, 53,4 x 40,2 cm.

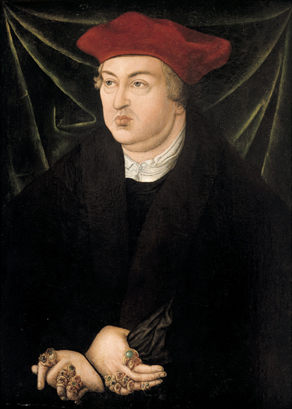
Portrait of Cardinal Albert of Brandenburg, Landesmuseum Mainz, 52,3 x 37,5 cm, workshop of Cranach

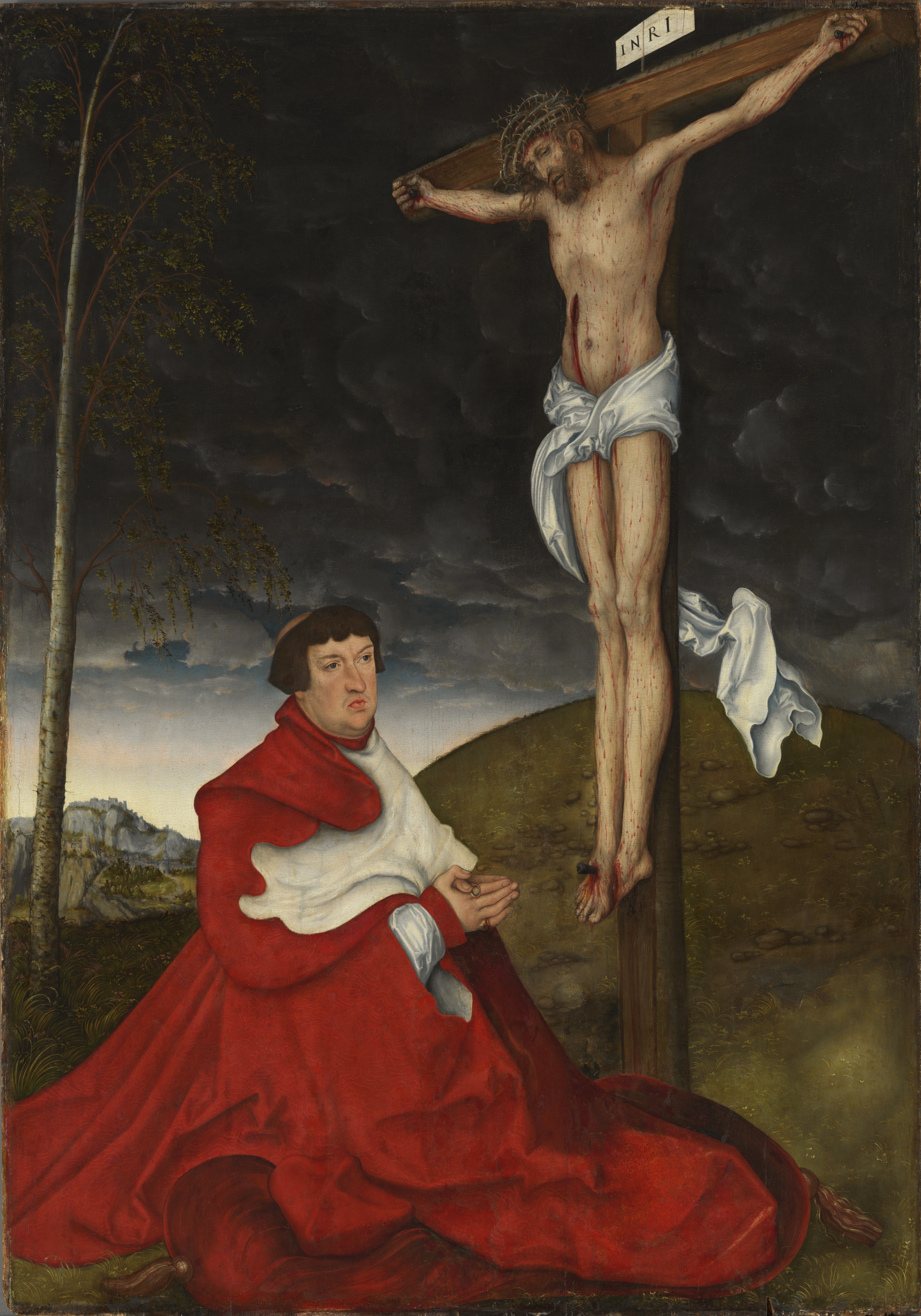
Cardinal Albert of Brandenburg with the Crucifixion, Alte Pinakothek, c. 1520–1525.
