= A Woman with a Basket of Beans in a Garden =

Painting by Pieter de Hooch

Woman with Basket of Beans in a Garden
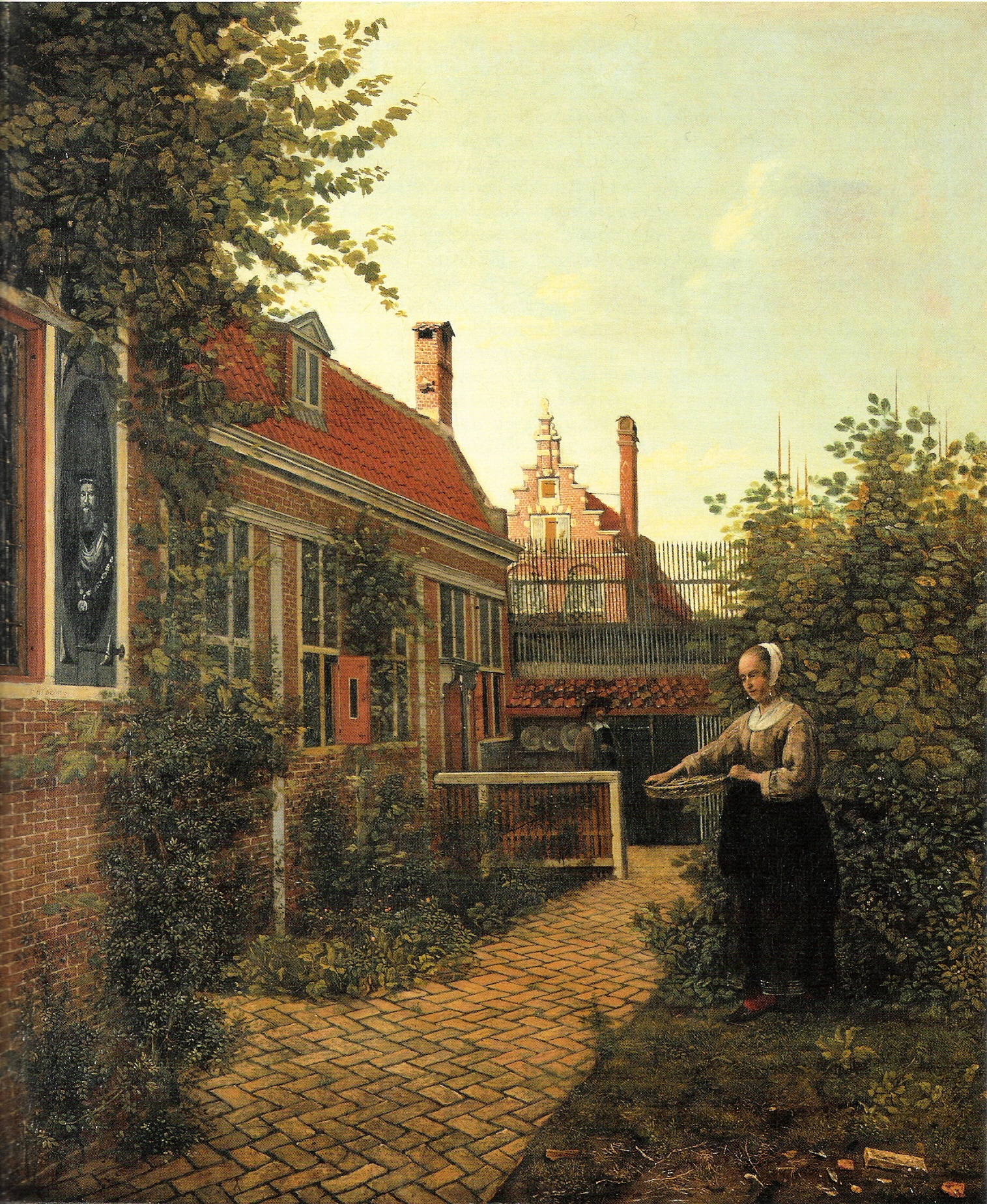
- Artist: Pieter de Hooch
- Year: 1661
- Medium: Oil on Canvas
- Dimensions: 69.5 cm × 59 cm (27.4 in × 23 in)
- Location: Kunstmuseum Basel, Basel
- Accession: G 1958.22

Woman with Basket of Beans a Kitchen Garden (1661) is an oil-on-canvas painting by the Dutch painter Pieter de Hooch. It is an example of Dutch Golden Age painting and is now in the Kunstmuseum Basel in Switzerland. The painting is notable for its depiction of Dutch almshouse architecture and its inclusion of a portrait on a window shutter, which has sparked debate about its meaning and De Hooch's possible social commentary.

== Description ==
The painting shows a scene in a summer garden. A woman stands on the right-hand edge of the picture, on a patch of lawn interspersed with weeds. In her hands she holds a basket of beans, probably picked from the bush behind her. Her simple clothing indicates her position as a servant, but the pearl earrings she is wearing could also suggest her position as mistress of the house. There is also a nobly dressed gentleman in the background.

On the left is a house with wild vines climbing up the brick wall. The facade is interrupted by thin pilasters made of natural stone, small windows with red shutters and a door with a canopy in the background. On the shutter in the foreground is a portrait of a nobleman, later identified as Charles V, wearing a chain of the Order of the Golden Fleece. The wall of the house is bordered with flowers and ornamental plants. The path separates the garden from the house. The stepped gable of another house can be seen behind the fence in the background. A large part of the picture is taken up by the sky, in which only one cloud can be seen.

The principal lines run towards a small hole to the right of the center of the picture. The painting is precise in its rendering of the plants and architecture, which are depicted in detail. It is dominated by shades of red and green, which are present in various gradations.

This painting was documented by Peter C. Sutton in 1980, who felt the original dating of 1651 was too early and that the "5" was written suspiciously heavily leading him to date it tentatively as 1661. He also compared the painting to other paintings of gardens that De Hooch made in the early 1660s, placing this piece in de Hooch's Amsterdam period, where he increasingly introduced sculpture and classical orders into the backgrounds of his paintings.

The architectural elements in the painting are believed to be inspired by the Eva van Hoogeveenshofje, an almshouse in Leiden designed by architect Arent van 's-Gravesande in the 1650s. This suggests that De Hooch, previously associated mainly with Delft and Amsterdam, may have also painted locations in Leiden. De Hooch's connections to Leiden, including ties to a brother-in-law living in Leiden, as well as documented visits, support this theory.

Other paintings of de Hooch may also feature almshouses, including:

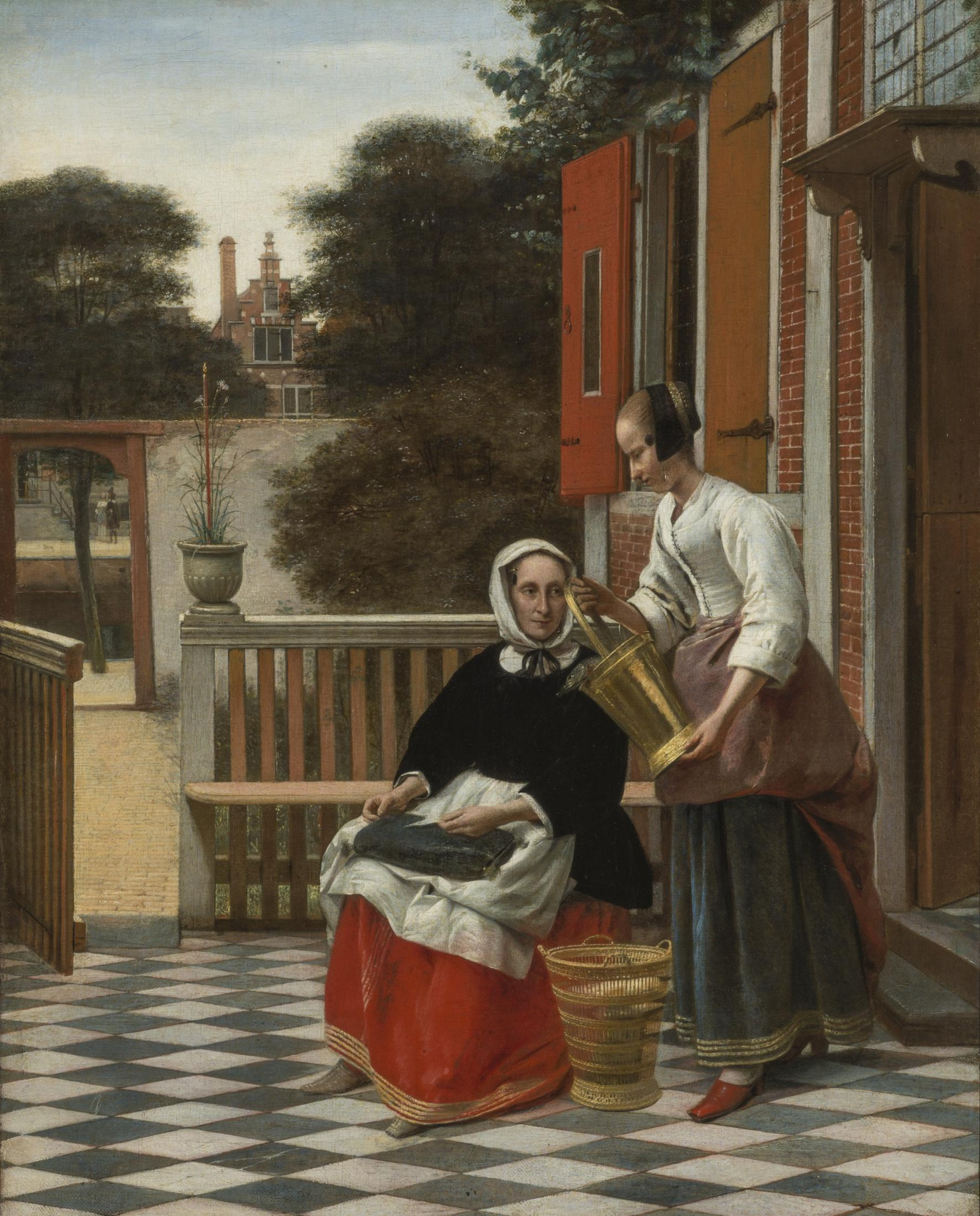
Lady and her Cook c. 1660

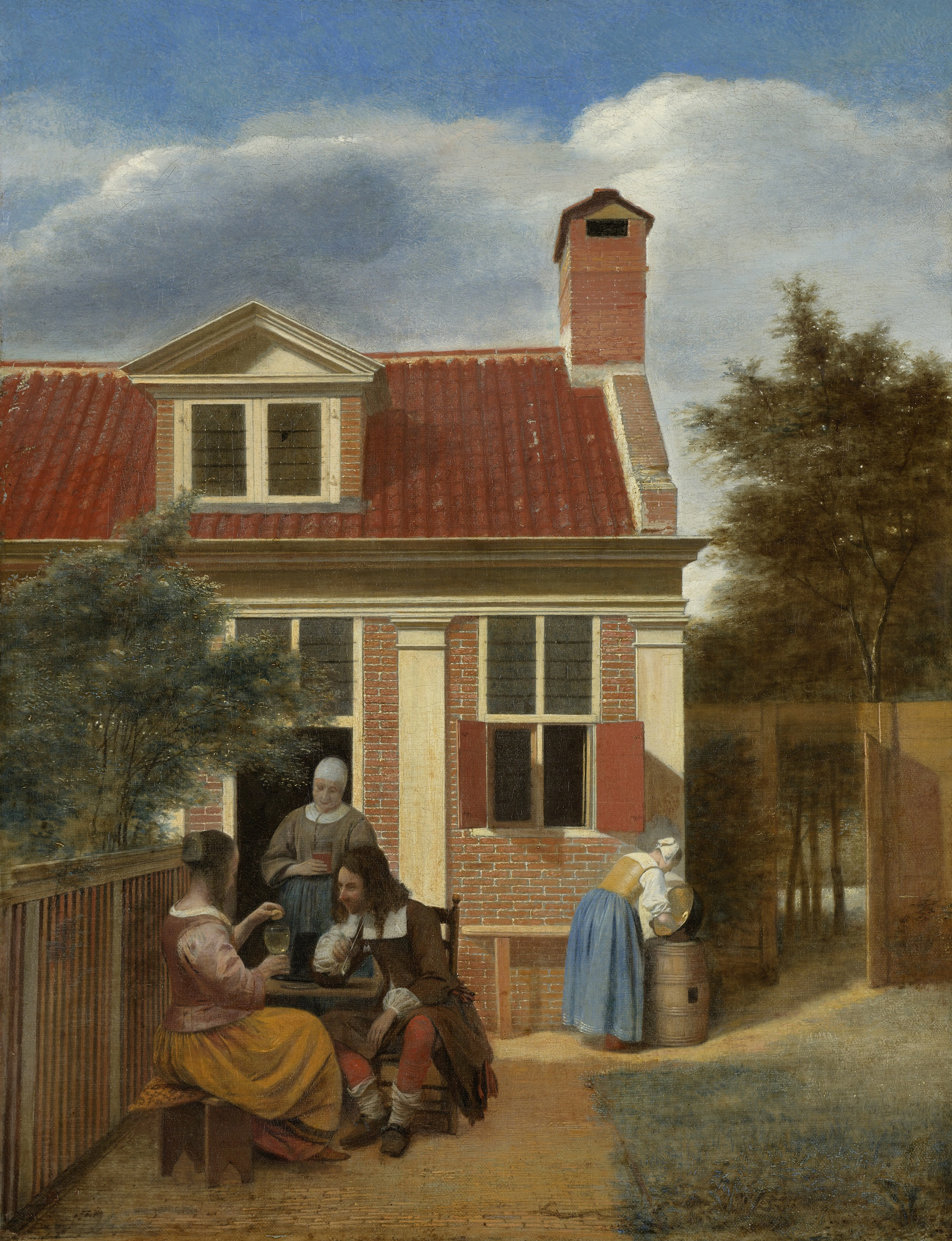
Company in a Courtyard Behind a House c. 1663 – c. 1665

== Portrait and Social Commentary ==
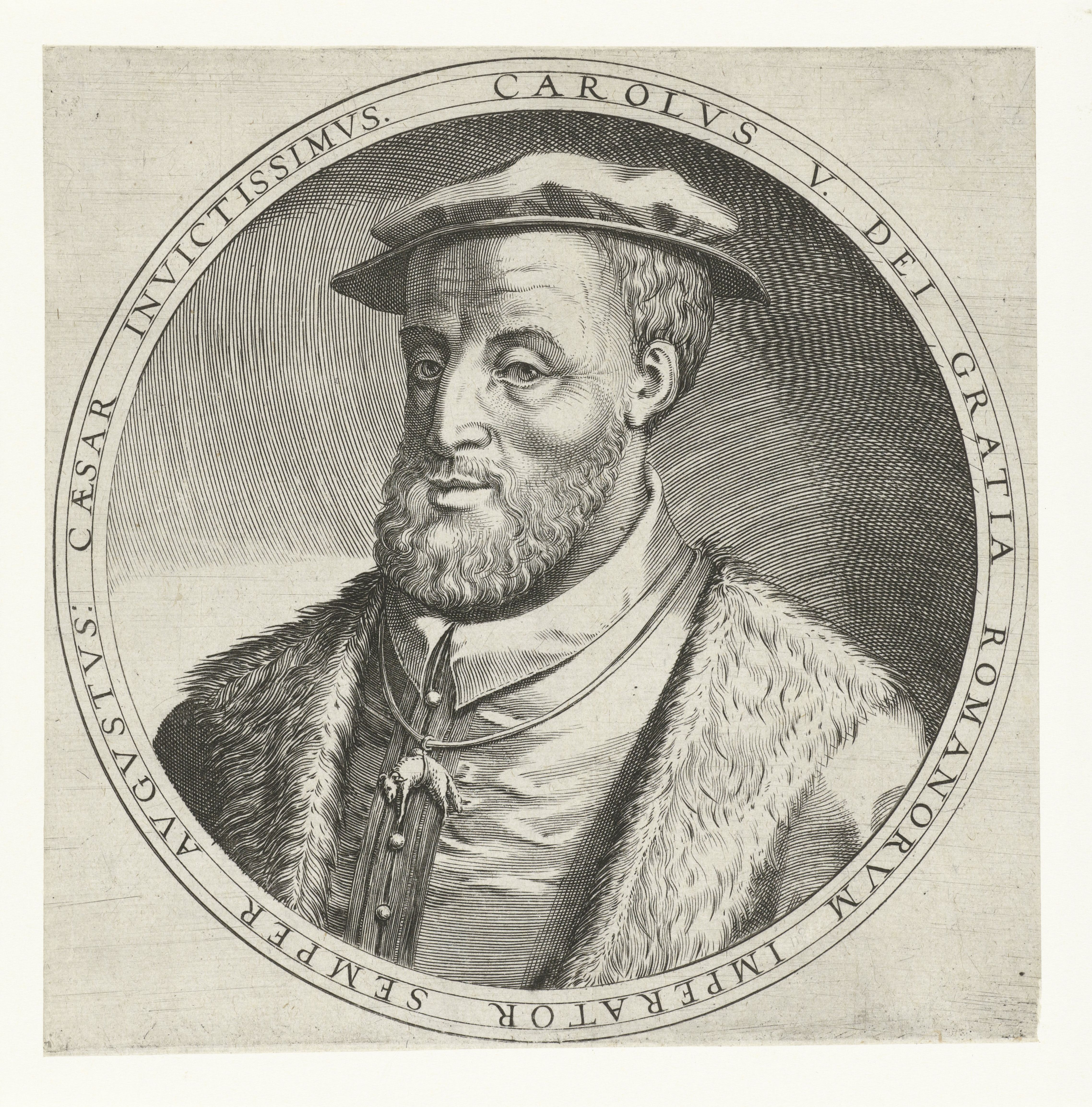
Portrait of Holy Roman Emperor Charles V by Frans Hogenberg

The portrait of Holy Roman Emperor Charles V on the window shutter in de Hooch's painting is a unique element that was later blotted out. This erasure could have been done by a subsequent owner of the painting or by de Hooch himself, who may have reconsidered this uncharacteristic inclusion. The portrait's presence is considered incongruous with de Hooch's typical work, making it a singular occurrence in his oeuvre.

de Hooch's initial inclusion of the emperor's portrait may have been a clever critique of the 'hofjes' (almshouses) built for poor relief, but used by the rich to enhance their own self-aggrandisement by demonstrating their allegiance to the ruling dynasty. By using the emperor's image, De Hooch could be making a pun on the Dutch word 'hof', meaning 'court', thus highlighting the incongruity between the almost palatial architecture of these charitable institutions and their purported purpose. This subtle commentary is further emphasised by the contrast between the grand building and the humble servant picking beans in the garden.

However, de Hooch's dependence on the bourgeois elite for his livelihood may have influenced his decision to remove the emperor's portrait. This alteration transformed the painting into a more conventional piece, celebrating Leiden's grand new architecture without the potentially controversial social commentary. The painting's success in this form is evidenced by two later variants featuring the same building but without the emperor's portrait. Following his move to Amsterdam, de Hooch focused on painting lavish interiors for the ruling classes, further distancing himself from the more direct and potentially critical approach seen in the Basel painting. While these later works may lack the unfeigned directness of the original, they reflect de Hooch's adaptation to the tastes and expectations of his patrons.

== Provenance ==
It was initially part of a private collection in England before being sold to a dealer 'Sully' (likely Arthur Joseph Sulley) prior to 1912. The work then passed through several notable dealers and collectors, including Duveen in Paris (1912 and 1925), Sedelmeyer in Paris (1913), Sir Alfred Mond in London (1927), and Lord Melchett in London (1929). In the 1930s, it changed hands multiple times, being owned by P.C. in Holland (1934), D. Katz in Dieren (1934-6), and the Schaeffer Gallery in New York (by 1936). The last recorded owner in this list is Max Geldner, who acquired it from M. Sterner in 1942, before being gifted to the Kunstmuseum in 1958. The painting was also exhibited extensively between 1913 and 1936, appearing in shows in Paris, Detroit, London, Arnhem, Haarlem, Rotterdam, and Amsterdam.

== See also ==
- List of paintings by Pieter de Hooch
- Charles V, Holy Roman Emperor
- Almshouses in the Netherlands
