= Leonard Harper =

Leonard Harper may refer to:

- Leonard Harper (producer)
- Leonard Harper (politician) (1837–1915), New Zealand explorer, lawyer and MP
- Leonard Harper (cricketer)
