= Courtyard with an Arbour =

Painting by Pieter de Hooch

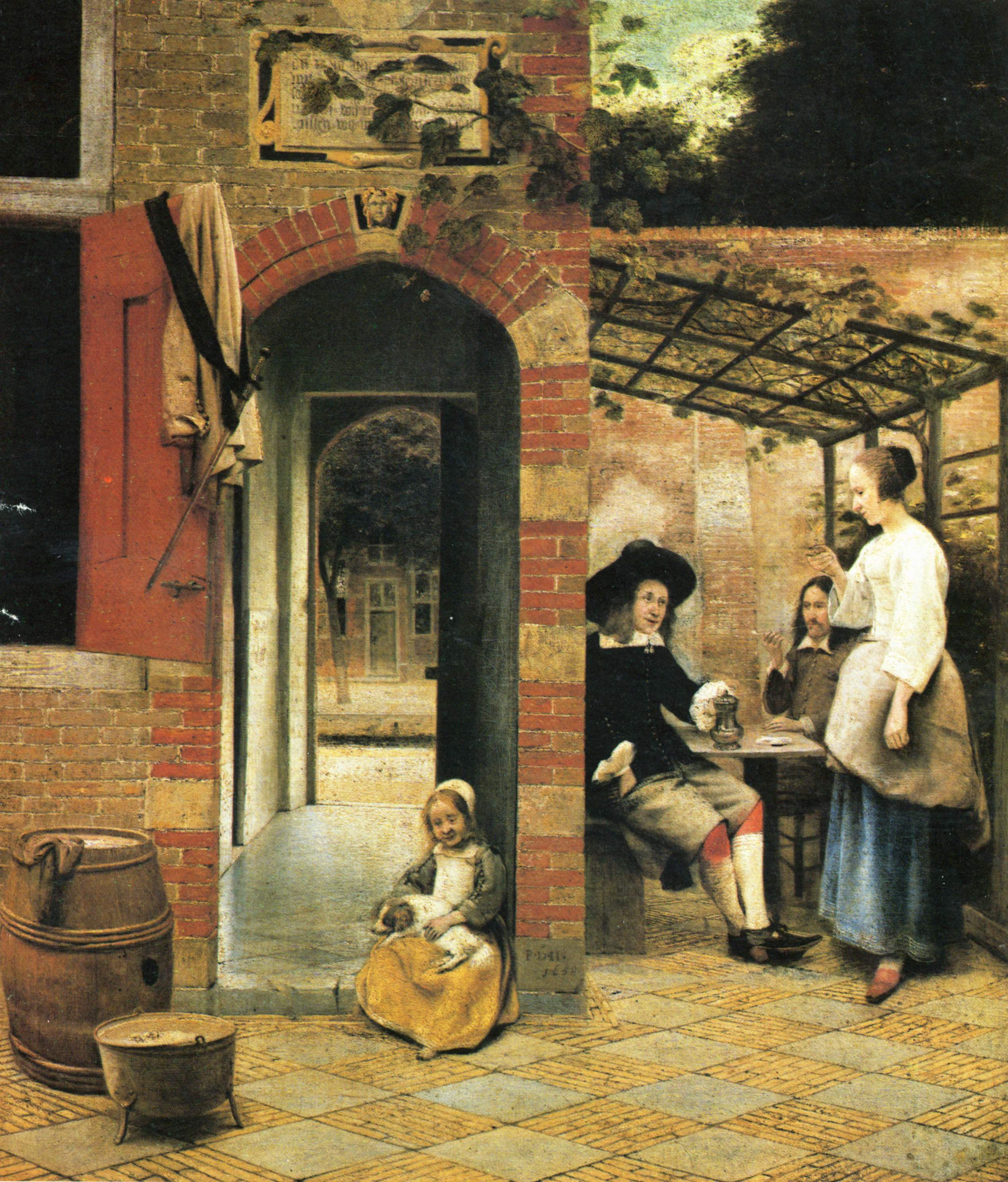
- Artist: Pieter de Hooch
- Year: 1658–1660
- Medium: Oil on canvas
- Dimensions: 66.5 cm × 56.5 cm (26.2 in × 22.2 in)
- Location: Private collection

Courtyard with an Arbour (1658–1660) is an oil-on-canvas painting by the Dutch painter Pieter de Hooch; it is now in a private collection. It was sold in 1992 for almost seven million dollars.

== History ==
This painting by Hooch was first documented by John Smith in 1833, who wrote:

47. A View in the Back Court of a House, looking towards a building, which has a lofty arched passage through it, paved with marble, at the end of which are seen a street, and some trees, upon the step of the passage, in front, is seated a child, dressed in a gray frock and yellow skirt, with a dog in her lap; and under a covering of vine trellis (in a recess, formed by some walls, and the corner of the house), are three men seated at a table, regaling, and a woman standing near them, with a glass of wine in her hand : various objects, among which are a cask and a pot, concur to give picturesque effect to the scene, which is brightly illumined by the appearance of the most perfect daylight. Signed, and dated 1658. 2 ft. 4 in. by 1 ft. 11 in.—G. This excellent picture was formerly in the collection of Mr. Walscott, at Antwerp, and was bought, a few years back, by the present proprietor, at a large price, at Berlin. Now in the collection of Edward Solly, Esq.

== Description ==
Smith updated his entry in his 1842 supplement and wrote:

15. A Gentleman taking Wine in the Back Court of a House. See description, No. 47, Vol. IV.; and for three men, read, " Two men." Sold in the collection of Edward Solly, Esq., 1837, by Messrs. Foster and Son, for 510 gs. Now in the collection of George Byng, Esq. Exhibited in the British Gallery, 1839. A duplicate of the preceding picture, somewhat clearer in tone, and with some trifling variations in the details, was imported from Holland by Mr. Chaplin, in 1839. Formerly in the collection of Mr. Koopman, at Utrecht.

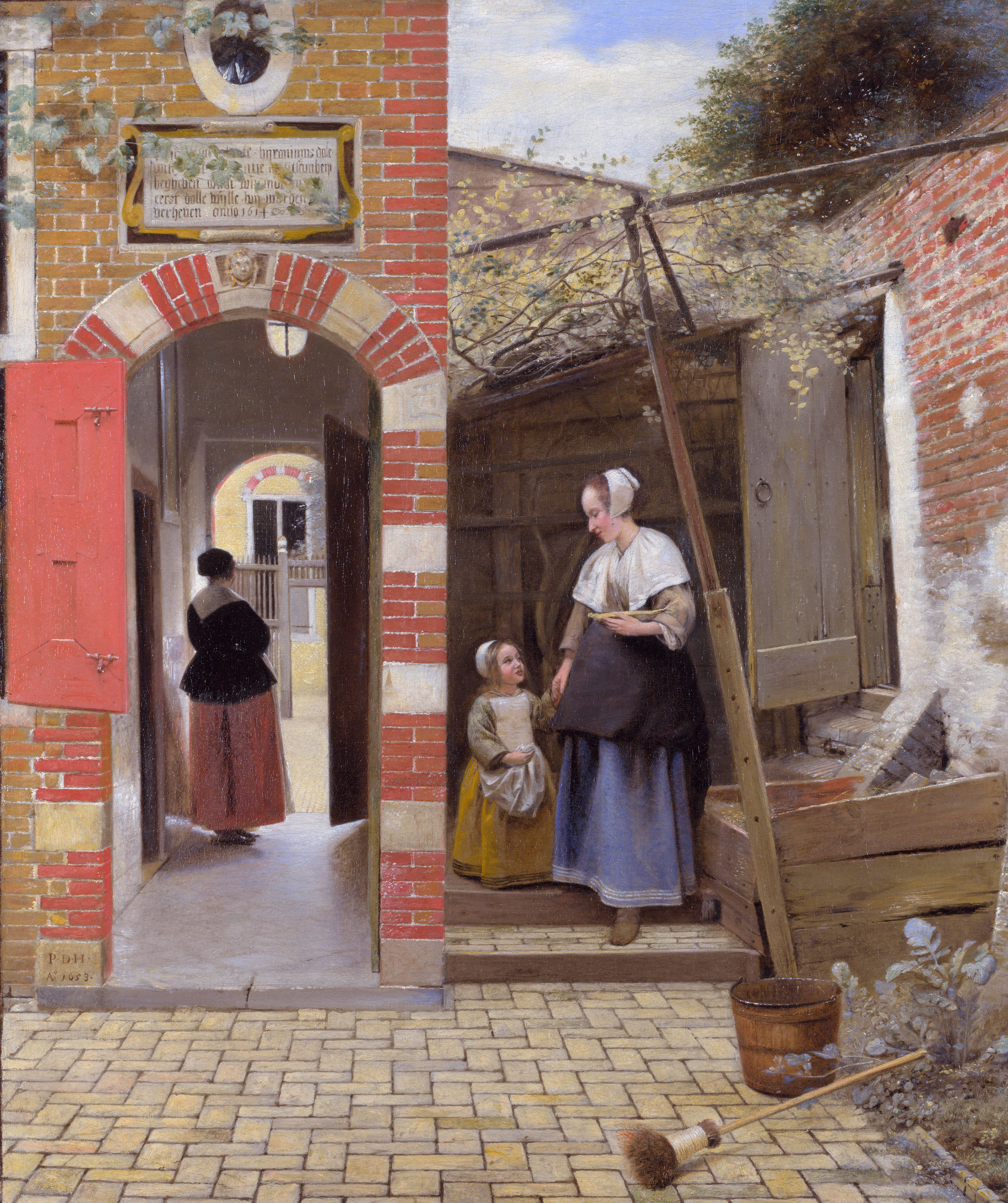
291. The Courtyard of a House in Delft, 1658

295. A Dutch Courtyard, 1658–1660

The painting was catalogued over a half-century later by Hofstede de Groot in 1908, who identified "Mr. Walscott, at Antwerp" and wrote:

299. COURTYARD WITH AN ARBOUR. Sm. 47, Suppl. 15; de G. 53. The spectator looks upon a house, built of red and yellowish-grey stone. Through it runs a lofty arched passage paved with tiles, giving a view of a canal with trees. On the steps of the archway, in the foreground, sits a little girl, wearing a grey jacket and yellow frock, with a dog on her lap. Beneath a vine-clad arbour, in a recess formed by the wall and the corner of the house, sit two men at a table. One of them wears a black hat and jacket, and grey breeches, red garters, and white stockings; the other is dressed in brownish grey. In front of the second man stands a woman with a glass of wine in her hand; she wears a white bodice, a blue petticoat, and, turned up over it, a light purplish-grey skirt. A grey cloak, a black bandolier, and a sword hang on a red window-sill to the left. Various objects, among which are a cask and a pot, add to the picturesque effect of the scene, which is brightly illumined by daylight. The courtyard is paved partly with yellow bricks, partly with grey stone. The whole picture is luminous in tone, but the lights and shadows in the passage are too slightly contrasted. Above the archway is the same inscription as in the London National Gallery picture (291), to which this forms a pendant. Of the five-line inscription only fragments are legible, as follows : (i) . . . ; (2) wy j (3) sa; (4) w . . . wy; (5) willen wy . . . 1614. [Compare the inscription in 291.] Signed, on the doorpost in the middle, "P D H 1658"; panel (Sm. says canvas), 26 1/2 inches by 22 1/2 inches. Mentioned by Waagen (Supplement, p. 323).

Exhibited at the British Gallery, London, 1839, and at the Royal Academy Winter Exhibition, London, 1881, No. 101. Sale.

- J. F. Wolschot, Antwerp, September 1, 1817.
- Bought in Berlin, a few years before 1833, by Edward Solly.
- Sale. Edward Solly, London, 1837 G535 : ids.).
- In the collection of George Byng in 1842 (Sm.).

Now in the collection of the Earl of Strafford, Wrotham Park, Enfield.

According to Sm. a replica, somewhat lighter in tone and with some trifling variations in the details, was brought from Holland to England by Chaplin in 1839; it had formerly been in the possession of S. A. Koopman, Utrecht. It may probably be identified with the picture belonging to Mr. A. de Rothschild (295)."

According to the 1992 Christie's sale record, tracing the provenance back in time from J. F. Wolschot the painting was formerly in the collection of Joséphine de Beauharnais and it was documented in an inventory of pictures at Château de Malmaison in 1814.

== See also ==
- List of paintings by Pieter de Hooch
