= Portrait of Giovanni della Volta with his Wife and Children =

1515 painting by Lorenzo Lotto

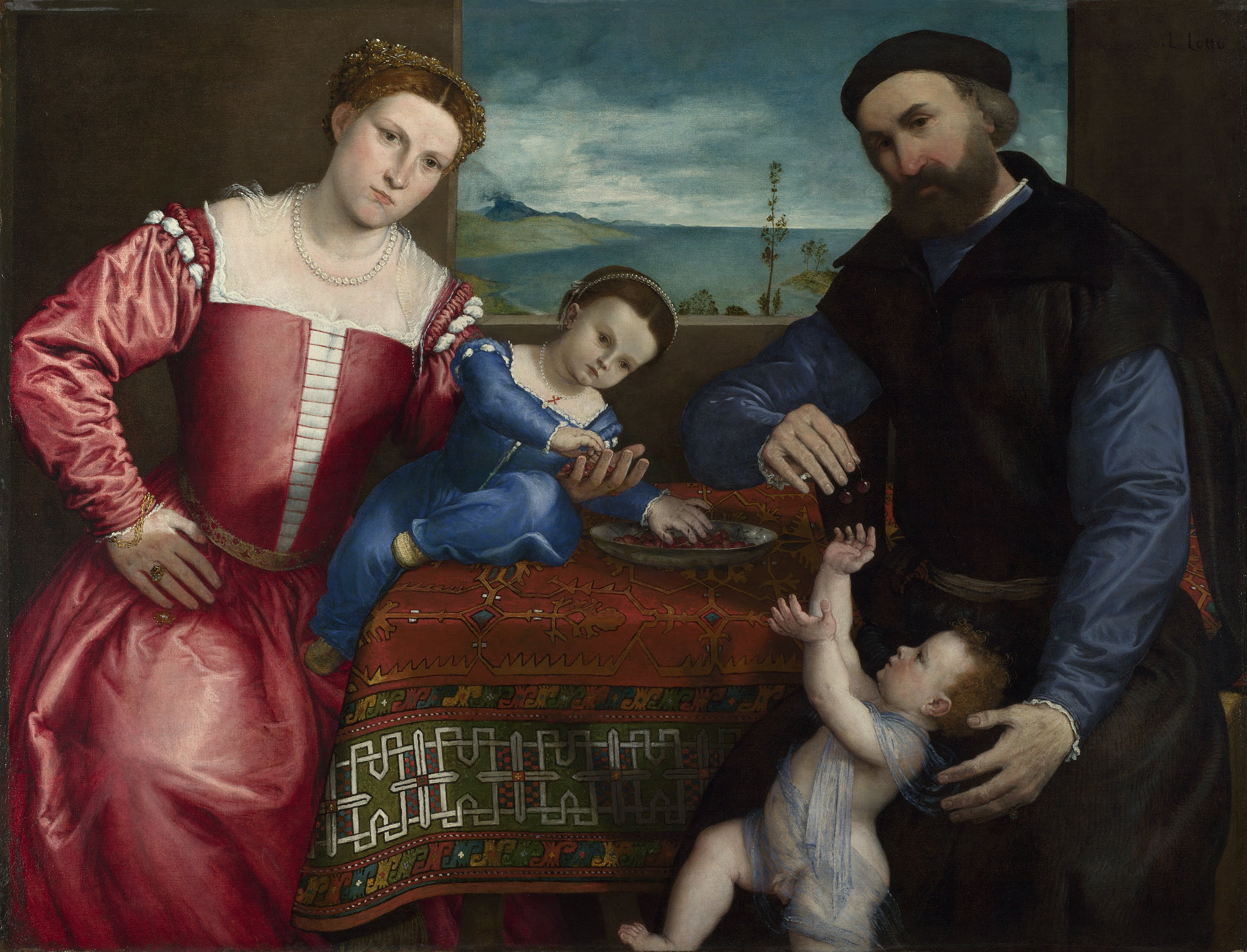
'Portrait of Giovanni della Volta with his Wife and Children (1547) by Lorenzo Lotto

Portrait of Giovanni della Volta with his Wife and Children is a 1547 portrait by Lorenzo Lotto, now in the National Gallery, London, to which it was left by Miss Sarah Solly (the daughter of Edward Solly in 1879.

It is an oil painting on canvas depicting the Venetian merchant Giovanni della Volta with his family. The artist's account books record a painting of that man and his family which was probably given as part-payment of rent he owed when he moved in 1547.
