= Sollie =

Sollie, Solie or Solié is a surname and given name which may refer to:

== Surname ==
- André Sollie (1947–2025), Flemish author and illustrator of children's literature
- Bruce Leonard Solie (1917–1992), CIA officer
- Gordon Solie (1929–2000), American professional wrestling play-by-play announcer born Francis Jonard Labiak
- Hans Johan Sollie (1885–?), Norwegian bookseller and politician
- Harald Bredo Sollie (1871–1947), Norwegian politician, jurist and naval officer
- Jean-Pierre Solié (1755–1812), French cellist, opera singer and composer
- Karen Solie (born 1966), Canadian poet
- Kjell Jakob Sollie (born 1953), Norwegian cross-country skier
- Solveig Sollie (born 1939), Norwegian politician
- Vigdis Sollie, competitor at the Miss World 1967 pageant

== Given name ==
- Sollie Cohen (1907–1966), American college football player
- Sollie Norwood (born 1952), American politician
- Sollie "Tex" Williams (1917–1985), American Western swing musician

== See also ==
- Solly (disambiguation)
