= A Man Smoking and a Woman Drinking in a Courtyard =

Painting by Pieter de Hooch

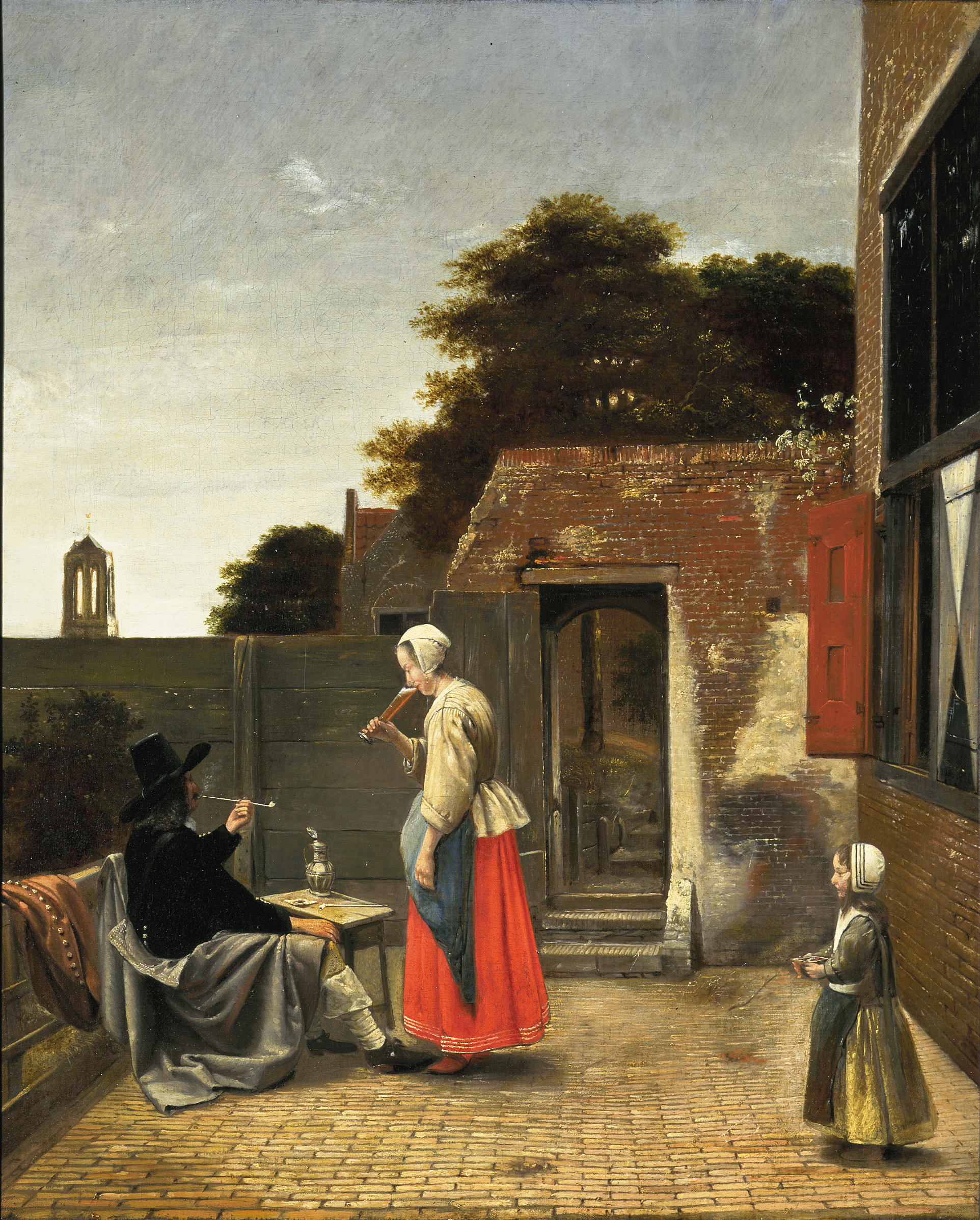
- Artist: Pieter de Hooch
- Year: 1658–1660
- Medium: Oil on canvas
- Dimensions: 78 cm × 65 cm (31 in × 26 in)
- Location: Mauritshuis; The Hague

A Man Smoking and a Woman Drinking in a Courtyard (1658–1660) is an oil-on-canvas painting by the Dutch painter Pieter de Hooch. It is an example of Dutch Golden Age painting and is part of the collection of the Mauritshuis, in The Hague, Netherlands.

== Description ==
The painting was documented by Hofstede de Groot in 1910, who wrote:

297. COURTYARD WITH A MAN SMOKING AND A WOMAN DRINKING. Sm. 30; de G. 56. This picture corresponds precisely to the Rothschild picture (295), except that the figure of the second man is here absent. It is an excellent work. Canvas, 30 1/2 inches by 25 1/2 inches. Mentioned by Waagen (Supplement, p. 131).

Exhibited at the Royal Academy Winter Exhibition, London, 1871 and 1888, No. 35; at the London Guildhall, 1892; and at the Burlington Fine Arts Club, 1900.

- Sold by Smith in 1822 (for 300).
- In the collection of W. Wells of Redleaf in 1833 (Sm.).
- Sale.– W. Wells, London, May 12, 1848 (.540: 155., Farrer).
- In Lord Overstone's collection in 1857 (Waagen).

Now [in 1908] in the collection of Lady Wantage, London, No. 108 in the 1902 catalogue.

== See also ==
- List of paintings by Pieter de Hooch
