= George Solly =

English cricketer and solicitor

Personal information
- Full name: George Edward Solly
- Born: 27 March 1855; West Heath, Cheshire, England
- Died: 10 March 1930 (aged 74); Menton, Alpes-Maritimes, France
- Batting: Unknown
- Bowling: Unknown

Domestic team information
- Years: Team
- 1877: Oxford University

Career statistics
Competition	First-class
Matches	1
Runs scored	8
Batting average	4.00
100s/50s	–/–
Top score	6
Balls bowled	228
Wickets	3
Bowling average	19.66
5 wickets in innings	–
10 wickets in match	–
Best bowling	3/44
Catches/stumpings	–/–
- Source: Cricinfo, 29 June 2020

George Edward Solly (27 March 1855 – 10 March 1930) was an English first-class cricketer and solicitor.

The son of Edward Harrison Solly, he was born in March 1855 at West Heath, Cheshire. He was educated at Winchester College, before going up to Magdalen College, Oxford. While studying at Oxford, he made a single appearance in first-class cricket for Oxford University against the Gentlemen of England at Oxford in 1877. Batting twice in the match, Solly scored 2 runs in the Oxford first innings before being dismissed by Robert Henderson, while in their second innings he was dismissed 6 runs by the same bowler. With the ball he took 3 for 44 in the Gentlemen of England first innings, dismissing Isaac Walker, A. N. Hornby and Henderson.

After graduating from Oxford, Solly qualified as a solicitor, practicing firstly at Congleton from 1885–91, before moving to London. In around 1890 he moved to Dorset where he served as a justice of the peace in 1900. Solly died in France at Menton in March 1930.
