= Edward Walter Solly =

English cricketer

Edward Solly
Cricket information
- Batting: Left-handed
- Bowling: Left-arm fast-medium

Career statistics
| Competition | First-class |
|---|---|
| Matches | 8 |
| Runs scored | 78 |
| Batting average | 8.66 |
| 100s/50s | 0/0 |
| Top score | 43 |
| Balls bowled | 1,128 |
| Wickets | 14 |
| Bowling average | 47.50 |
| 5 wickets in innings | 0 |
| 10 wickets in match | 0 |
| Best bowling | 3/25 |
| Catches/stumpings | 1/0 |
- Source: Cricinfo, 16 August 2022

Edward Walter Solly (7 May 1882 – 12 February 1966) was an English first-class cricketer who played eight matches for Worcestershire as a professional between 1903 and 1907.

Born in Eastry, Kent, Solly made his debut against Cambridge University in early June 1903, taking a single wicket, that of Leonard Harper. That was his only appearance that season; the following summer he again played once, this time against Oxford University, taking two wickets and hitting his highest score, 43, from number ten in the order.

In 1905 Solly played two County Championship games with reasonable success: he took seven wickets at 25.28, including a career best of 3–25 against Gloucestershire. He played a single match the following year (against Oxford) and in 1907 appeared twice more in the Championship, claiming 3–66 in what proved to be his last innings' bowling, against Somerset.

He died in Wales at the age of 83, in Cefn Mably, Glamorgan.
