= The Courtyard of a House in Delft =

Painting by Pieter de Hooch

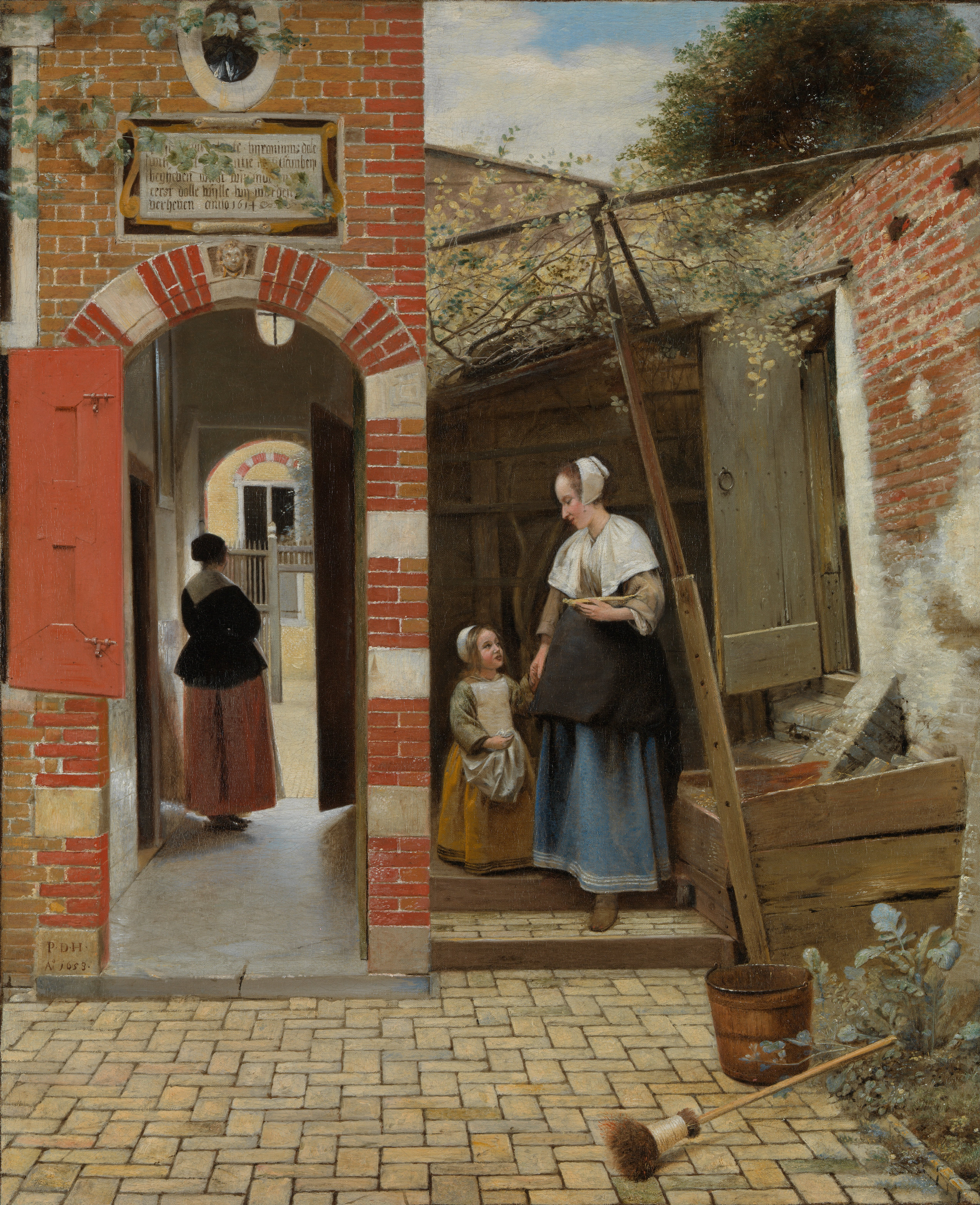
- Artist: Pieter de Hooch
- Year: 1658
- Medium: Oil on canvas
- Dimensions: 73.5 cm × 60 cm (28.9 in × 24 in)
- Location: National Gallery, London

The Courtyard of a House in Delft is a 1658 oil painting by Pieter de Hooch, located in the National Gallery, London. The painting is considered typical of de Hooch's middle period, in which he painted detailed portrayals of Dutch domestic architecture and courtyards. The painting is signed and dated "P.D.H. / A 1658" on the archway to the left.

== Description ==
The painting depicts a quiet courtyard scene in which a young maid holds the hand of a small girl. The figures are posed, but the painting is not a portrait, nor is it a “snapshot” of life in 17th century Holland. The scene is divided into two sections. To the left, an archway leads from the courtyard into a passageway and through the house. The textures and details of the house, such as the brickwork of the archway and the tile pattern of the courtyard, are rendered in detail.

Through the archway, a woman dressed in black and red stands in the passageway, looking out to the street. Above the archway is a stone tablet that was originally placed at the entrance to the Hieronymusdale Cloister in Delft. The tablet reads, (in Dutch) "This is in Saint Jerome’s vale, if you wish to repair to patience and meekness. For we must first descend if we wish to be raised. 1614". This tablet still exists and is housed in the Delft Gemeente Musea, Museum Het Prinsenhof. Additionally, a replica is installed above the entrance to Oude Delft 161, a residence of de Hooch in 1652.

In the right section of the painting, in addition to the woman and child, a vine grows on a wooden structure and an open door leads through a brick wall at the far right. The woman is carrying a dish and a broom and bucket have been left in the courtyard.

== Symbolism ==
De Hooch’s painting explores themes of domesticity, specifically a woman’s role in the home. The mother in the painting, for instance, is positioned in a more “formal” part of the house while the maid and child are in a more “natural” area. The broom in the foreground is a symbol of a “well-ordered household,” in which even old or well-used items like the broom and bucket are well-maintained and spotless. The objects also symbolize the young maid’s responsibilities in the home. Despite this, there is an “air of ambiguity” to the painting. The contents of the dish the maid is carrying, what the little girl is holding, and what lies beyond the doorway at the top of the stairs are left unclear. The meaning of the tablet above the archway is also obscured, both physically by the leaves covering it and in its meaning, which remains “unclear.”

This ambiguity extends to the figure of the mother, who appears to be more expensively dressed than the maid, but has distanced herself from both the maid and child. While her position as the woman of the house makes her responsible for the home’s care, she is also responsible for how her home and family are perceived by others.

== Relation to Other Works ==
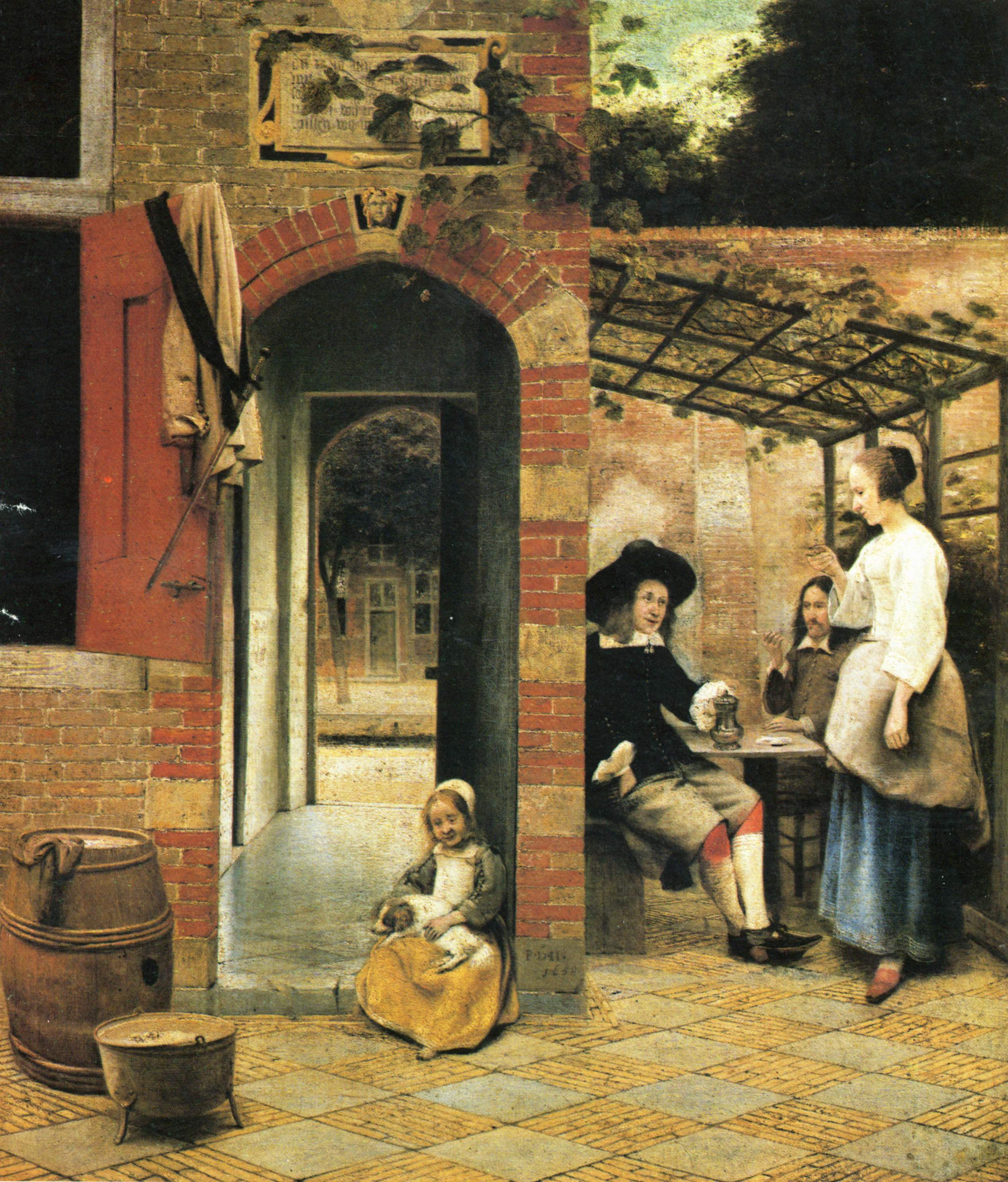
Courtyard with an Arbour c. 1658

“The Courtyard of a House in Delft” is one of six paintings that de Hooch dated 1658. The painting shares a close relationship with another work from the same year, titled “Courtyard with an Arbour,” which is now in a private collection, after being sold for £4.4 million at a Christie's auction. Both paintings depict similar architectural elements, including the same tablet above the archway. However, there are differences between the two paintings, such as the arrangement of the figures and the items depicted in each scene. The figures in Courtyard with an Arbour are engaged in leisurely activities, and a dog has been added to the composition. The inscription on the tablet is also obscured to a greater degree in “Courtyard with an Arbour”.

While both paintings share the same date, The Courtyard of a House in Delft bears a stronger resemblance to de Hooch’s earlier interior scenes and may have been completed first. It is likely that de Hooch used “The Courtyard of a House in Delft” as the basis for Figures Drinking in a Courtyard, revising the original design to suit the theme of the newer work.

== Provenance ==
The painting was documented by Hofstede de Groot in 1908, and catalogued by John Smith (Sm. Suppl. 50) and de Groot (de G. 38).

It remained in the Netherlands until 1825, when it was bought by Sir Robert Peel. It was engraved by Paul Adolphe Rajon. It was sold in 1871 by Peel's son Sir Robert Peel, 3rd Baronet, along with the rest of his father's art collection, to the National Gallery, London, where it was No. 835 in the 1906 catalogue.

The work was the subject of a 1981 poem by Derek Mahon.

== See also ==
- List of paintings by Pieter de Hooch
