= The Crucifixion (Cranach) =

Painting by Lucas Cranach the Elder

Crucifixion
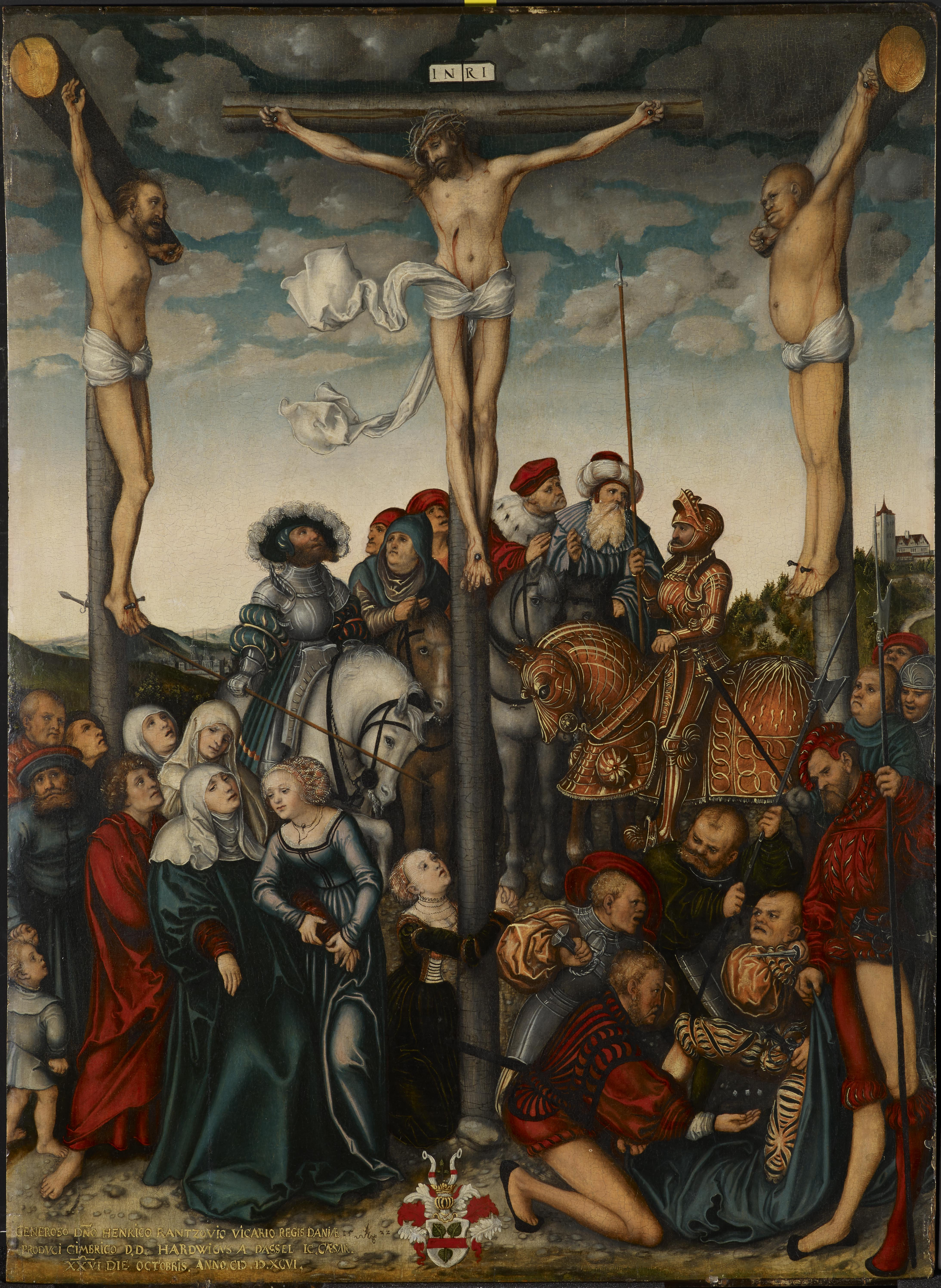
- Artist: Lucas Cranach the Elder
- Year: 1532
- Medium: oil on panel
- Dimensions: 76 cm × 55 cm (30 in × 21.5 in)
- Location: Indianapolis Museum of Art; Indianapolis, Indiana

Crucifixion is an oil painting by German artist Lucas Cranach the Elder. One of many versions of the subject painted by Cranach, this one, created in 1532, is now in the Indianapolis Museum of Art.

== Description ==
The bottom half of the painting is crowded with figures, all symbolically arranged to the left and the right of Christ. On the viewer's left is the Virgin Mary, who is held by John the Evangelist, and Mary Magdalene is holding onto the Cross. The Good Thief and Longinus gaze directly at him, alluding to their salvation. There is a sharp contrast to those on the right, which includes Roman soldiers who are avoiding his gaze and the Impenitent thief, depicted as bald and bloated. Behind them are contemporary figures, who are considered unenlightened, as they have not yet borne witness to Christ.

The painting emphasizes Jesus Christ's sacrifice, and uses the witnesses to show recognition of the event of his death as a clear reference to new Lutheran theology; sinful mankind is only redeemed through Christ, not through the Catholic church.

== Historical information ==
Cranach was the court painter to the electors of Saxony in Wittenberg, an area in the heart of the emerging Protestant faith. His patrons were powerful supporters of Martin Luther, and Cranach used his art as a symbol of the new faith. Cranach made numerous portraits of Luther, and provided woodcut illustrations for Luther's German translation of the Bible. Crucifixion should be seen through the lens of this new reformed religion.

=== Acquisition ===
The Indianapolis Museum of Art purchased the painting in 2000, using funding from the Clowes Collection. The provenance of Crucifixion is ambiguous, and the Indianapolis Museum of Art is attempting to learn where the painting originated.
