= A Dutch Courtyard =

Painting by Pieter de Hooch

- Artist: Pieter de Hooch
- Year: 1658–1660
- Medium: Oil on canvas
- Dimensions: 69.5 cm × 60 cm (27.4 in × 24 in)
- Location: National Gallery of Art, Washington, D.C.

A Dutch Courtyard (1658–1660) is an oil-on-canvas painting by the Dutch Golden Age painter Pieter de Hooch. The original resides in the collection of the National Gallery of Art in Washington, D.C. A later, altered replica also exists, part of the collection of the Mauritshuis Museum in The Hague. In 2026, the altered version was restored to match the Washington version.

== Painting ==
In a walled courtyard beside a brick house, a pair of soldiers enjoy banter with a serving woman. As one of the soldiers takes a puff from a clay pipe, across the table, a bearded man wears a cuirass over a brown shirt, watching the serving woman drink beer from a pass-glass, a glass used in a traditional drinking game. A young girl appears from the right, delivering glowing embers for the soldiers' pipes. Through the brick wall, an open door reveals a path, leading past a wooded yard to a distant house, which is also visible above the wall. Over the wooden palisade to the far left, the tower of Niewue Kerk in Delft is visible, making clear that this painting originates from De Hooch's Delft period, whilst a member of the Painters' Guild of Saint Luke and during his tenure at the Delft School.

Behind the figures, is presumably a brick section of the old city wall of Delft. Similar to Woman and Child in a Courtyard, it is undoubted that these scenes were based on views from gardens behind the houses on the west side of the canal, the Oude Gracht. This area, the Binnenwatersloot, was where De Hooch's wife resided prior to their engagement, and presumably where De Hooch moved after their marriage. However, in this particular case, he has also exercised artistic freedom in portraying the pointed roof of the Nieuwe Kerk tower. Notably, he has omitted the small spires that typically adorn the top of the tower. De Hooch often creatively blended architectural motifs in an imaginative manner for compositional purposes.

As in his other paintings, a harmonious atmosphere is built between employee and employer – in this case the serving woman and the soldiers. It can be asserted that De Hooch's interest in this theme stems the he himself became familiar with during his time as a servant for Justus De La Grange, a linen merchant, during the early 1650's. His empathy to the relationship of mothers to children may well have stemmed from the birth of his children, a son, born in 1655, and a daughter, born in 1656, both of which would have been the same age as the child represented in the painting, and many other works of his.

This artwork represents one of the notable achievements within De Hooch's collection of works in the 'Delft Style' circa 1660. The structured and harmonious organisation of architectural and figurative elements creates a peaceful and quiet mood. The soft lighting of the scene, coupled with De Hooch's meticulous depiction of the buildings and courtyard's bricks and mortar, elevates the painting's naturalistic qualities. The balanced harmony is further derived from De Hooch's discernment of colour, skillfully incorporating accents of red, blue, and white throughout the composition. Notably impactful is the silky gleam of the young girl's blue dress, artfully conveyed through the application of yellow highlights.

In De Hooch's earlier genre scenes, a recurring theme involves soldiers seated around a table, engaging in smoking and drinking while being attended to by a serving woman. In this particular work, he has transported this subject outdoors to the courtyard of a middle-class home. The men and women depicted in these scenes exude liveliness and playful interaction, as evidenced by the easy banter between the soldiers and the maidservant in this instance. These scenes probably reflect the influence of the Rotterdam artist Ludolph de Jongh, whom De Hooch must have known before moving to Delft and joining the guild in 1655. The sun-drenched setting, with a distant church tower in view, imparts an additional sense of goodwill and optimism to the scene. It portrays a time when the looming threat of war, which had recently burdened the Dutch, was no longer prevalent.

=== Painting techniques ===
The fabric support, characterised by a medium-weight and plain-weave, has been lined with the tacking margins trimmed. An even, somewhat thick off-white ground has been applied to the support. This ground is coated with a transparent brown wash, its thickness diminishing in the sky area. Employing the brown wash as an undertone, De Hooch layered paint in thin, transparent coats. The impasted highlights are formed through small, closely positioned dabs of colour, frequently overlapping. This artistic technique results in a flickering effect, particularly noticeable in the flesh tones.

== Repainting ==
To achieve the sense of order, De Hooch carefully manipulated elements of the composition, strengthening the figural group. Thorough visual examination and infrared reflectography conducted at 1.2 to 2.5 microns reveal several modifications made by the artist. The little girl seems to have been elevated slightly and shifted approximately one inch to the right from her initial position thus, adjusted to overlap with the intersection of the house and the rear wall of the courtyard. This placement, along with the presence of the vibrant orange-red window shutter directly above her, works to diminish the pronounced sense of recession induced by the building's receding perspective. The standing woman's head might have been more upright as she raised her glass to a slightly higher level, and an earlier position of her foot was painted over. The original fence extended between the two seated men, but this was altered. The arm and beer stein positions of the central seated figure were adjusted, with a noticeable pentimento indicating that the stein was initially positioned farther back, covering the view of the elbow. In the background, the courtyard visible through the open door initially featured a second, somewhat thinner tree trunk. The arch in the doorway is painted over both tree trunks, suggesting that it was likely added late in the creative process. Lastly, the top of the building on the right initially terminated at a lower point, not extending vertically to the top of the picture space.

In 2019, infrared imaging revealed unexpected underdrawings of ship masts adjacent to the Nieuwe Kerk tower. These masts, likely of large rigged vessels, would be incapable of navigating Delft's 17th-century waterways, suggest either an abandoned earlier composition or canvas reuse. While de Hooch occasionally depicted ships in his later works, such imagery was atypical during the period of this painting's creation.

The paint remains in good condition, displaying minimal loss and only slight abrasion, with notable exceptions being the background trees and a one-inch strip along the top of the sky, which exhibit more severe abrasion. Additional areas affected by abrasion encompass the little girl's face, the woman's blue apron, and the cloak of the foreground-seated man. A restoration effort in 2002 addressed these abrasions, involving inpainting to seamlessly integrate them with the overall composition. Historical records indicate a previous treatment in Holland during the 1930s before the most recent restoration.

== Mauritshuis replica ==
An autograph replica, said to be of lower quality, is present in the Mauritshuis, The Hague. The primary difference in composition between the two works lies in the absence of the seated soldier. However, X-rays reveal the soldier's initial presence, indicating that it was later painted over by another hand. The cuirass worn by this soldier corresponds to those found in other De Hooch paintings from the same period, including A Soldier Paying a Hostess, dated 1658.

In the 1920s, restorer Martin de Wild uncovered the overpainted soldier and photographed him before painting over the surviving figure again. The soldier had been removed by someone other than De Hooch between approximately 1660 and the early nineteenth century. His pipe and beer tankard remained visible on the table, his cloak hung over a gate. Later technical examination, including macro-X-ray fluorescence spectroscopy, did not establish who had removed the figure or why.

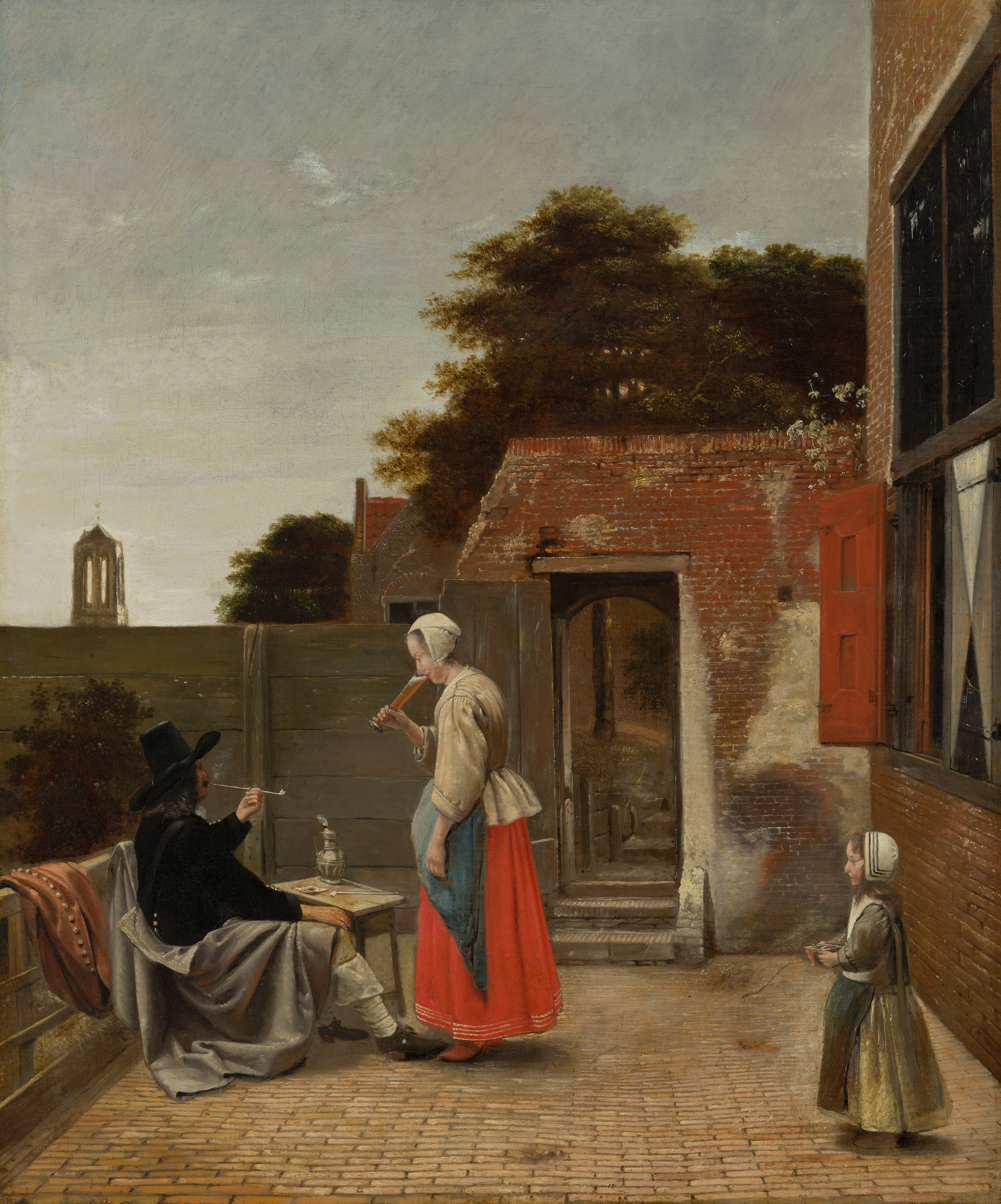
Mauritshuis version before restoration

After 2026 restoration

In 2026, the Mauritshuis restored the soldier to the composition, using the Washington version as a reference. The intervention was designed to be reversible. The restored composition makes the scene's drinking game more apparent, the woman drinks from a marked pasglas while the two soldiers watch. The painting was subsequently titled Figures in a Courtyard (Een binnenplaats met figuren).

The provenance of the replica is also unknown before the 1820's, with this painting titled differently as 'A Man Smoking and a Woman Drinking in a Courtyard', and its first noted appearance as a sale by the John Smith Gallery, in London for 300 pounds in 1822, ending up in the Mauritshuis' collection by 1947.

Multiple copies of this painting existed, including an old copy in a Dutch dealer's possession in 1903.

== Provenance ==
In a watercolour portrayal of a Dutch interior dated 1783 by W. J. Laquy, a German artist active in Amsterdam, the Washington painting is shown hanging on the rear wall. This illustration suggests that, at the time, the painting was housed in a Dutch-style gold frame. The painting's provenance before 1820 remains unknown, leaving uncertainty about the residence in which Laquy encountered it, and how it ended up in the possession of C.S Roos by 1820.

=== Sales ===
The first sale of the painting occurred in August 1820, where, from the ownership of C.S Roos, through the art dealer R.W.P de Vries, the painting was purchased by Isaac Van Eyck for either 600 or 750 florins. The next sale is listed as ownership transferring to a Mr. Mason after a sale in Paris. Following this, the painting belonged to various members of the Rothschild banking family, starting with Baron Lionel de Rothschild who acquired the painting after an 1842 or earlier sale. Through inheritance, the piece passed to his son, Nathan Mayer Rothschild, 1st baron Rothschild, who through exchange or sale passed ownership to his brother, baron Alfred Charles de Rothschild, for Halton House, near Wendover, Buckinghamshire. Upon Alfred de Rothchild's death in 1918, the painting was bequeathed to his illegitimate daughter, Almina Victoria, Countess of Carnarvon, who sold the piece to Duveen Brothers, Inc., in 1924 who flipped the painting in November of that year to Andrew W. Mellon, a prominent politician and later philanthropist. In December 1934 'A Dutch Courtyard' was deeded to The A.W. Mellon Educational and Charitable Trust, who gifted the painting to the National Gallery of Art in 1937.

== See also ==
- List of paintings by Pieter de Hooch
