= Leonard Harper (cricketer) =

English cricketer (1880–1924)

Leonard Vyse Harper (12 December 1880 – 13 January 1924) was an English first-class cricketer active 1900–04 who played for Surrey (awarded county cap 1904). He was born and died in Balham.
