= Edward Solly =

English merchant and art collector (1776–1844)

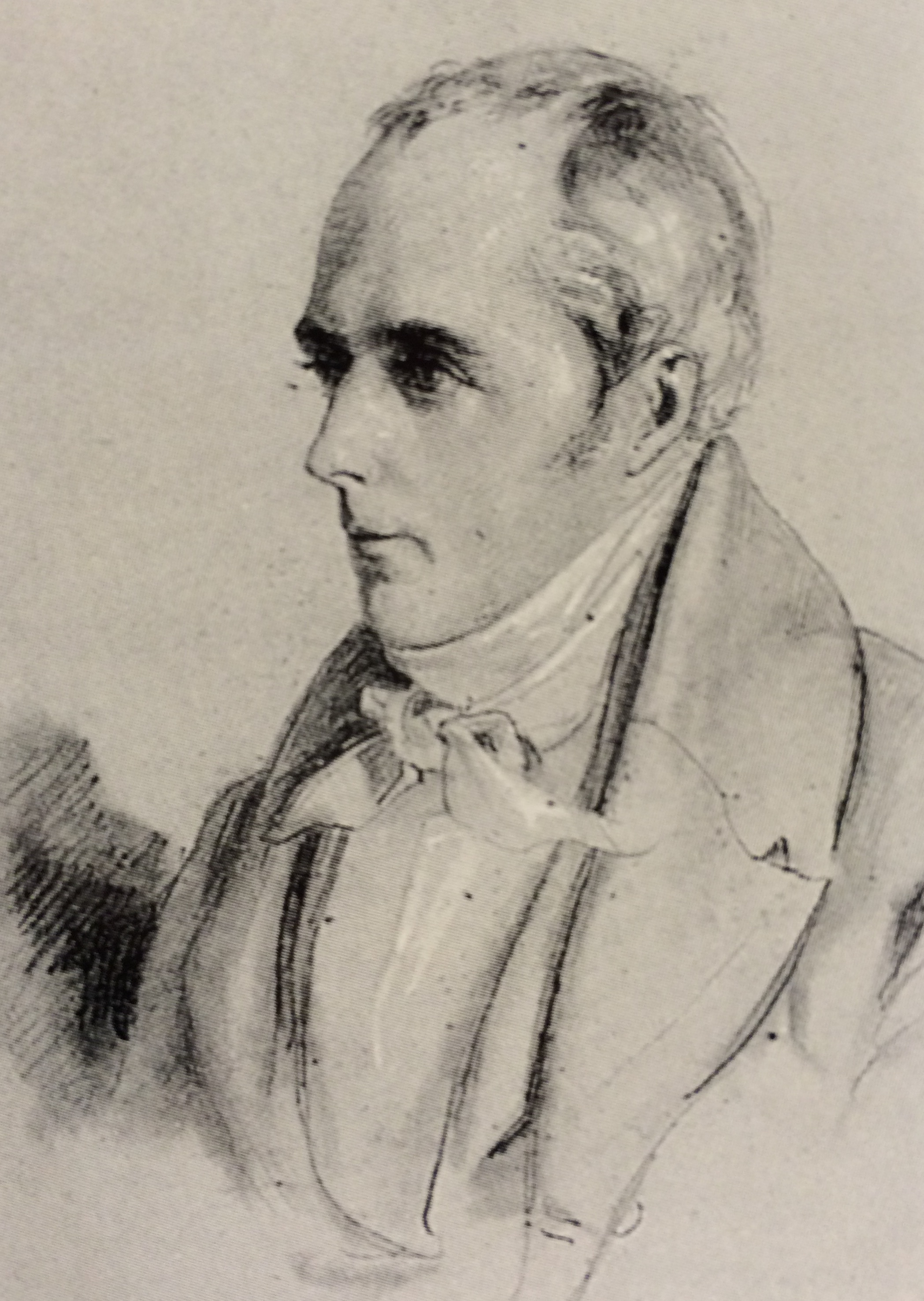
Portrait of Edward Solly, (Gemäldegalerie, Berlin)

Edward Solly (25 April 1776 – 2 December 1844) was an English merchant living in Berlin, who amassed an unprecedented collection of Italian Trecento and Quattrocento paintings and outstanding examples of Early Netherlandish painting, at a time when those schools were still largely unappreciated. In 1821, following negotiations by his associate Benjamin Wegner, Solly sold his collection of about 3000 works to the Prussian king; 677 of them formed a core of the Gemäldegalerie, Berlin. Solly acquired a second collection during his years in London after 1821. Solly is also credited for having undertaken a perilous journey to deliver the first news of Napoleon's defeat at the Battle of Leipzig to the English.

== Life ==
Solly was a younger brother in an English merchant family headed by Isaac Solly that were engaged in the Baltic timber trade, with offices in the city of London. As Non-Conformists the family suffered social restrictions in the higher levels of English society. During the Napoleonic Wars the firm secured immense contracts for the supply of Prussian and Polish oak timber and ship's stores from the Baltic. Solly removed to Stockholm and then in 1813 to Berlin, overseeing the family firm's bulk purchases on the part of the European continent not covered by Napoleon's Continental System. Through his acquaintance with 'Fighting Charlie' Vane he was present at the Battle of Leipzig in October 1813. Afterwards he presented a fine sword to Captain Thomas Harris inscribed with the legend From Edward Solly To Thomas Noel Harris, In Commemoration Of Their Fellowship At The Memorable Battle Of Leipzig Of The 18th And 19th Of October 1813. Due to his familiarity with the Northern Lowlands, Solly volunteered to carry the news of Napoleon's defeat to London. The journey took him fifteen days through enemy territory. He sailed to England across the North Sea on board a Dutch herring boat and arrived in London twenty-four hours before the official messenger.

In Berlin he married the daughter of Auguste Krüger in 1816. His great personal charm and intelligence opened the highest social circles, and as his business affairs prospered he was on good terms with ministry officials, the Prussian court, artists, connoisseurs and intellectuals.

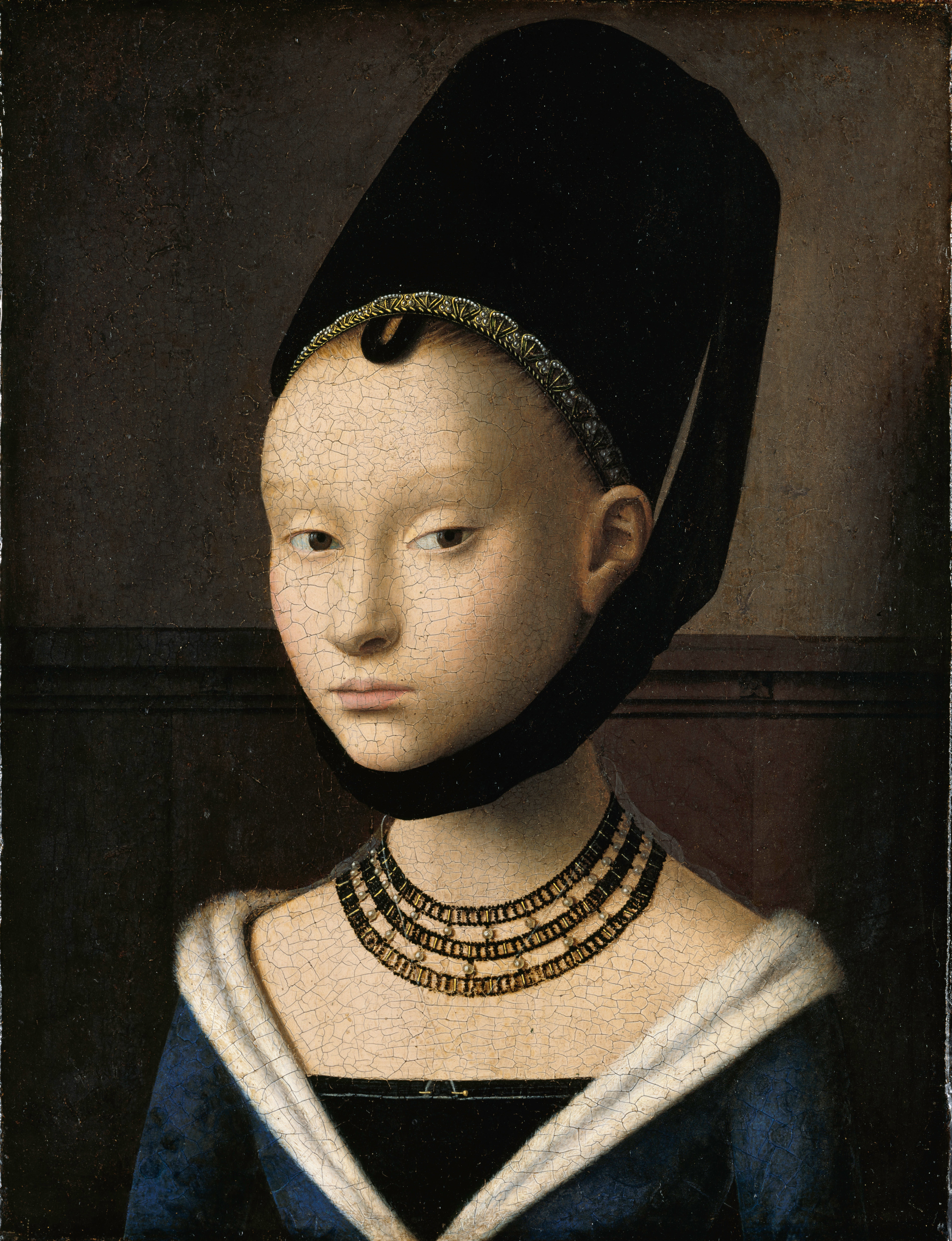
Portrait of a Young Girl, Petrus Christus

In his travels he began to take an interest in paintings. The social turmoil of the wars and the dissolution of monasteries brought many works of art onto the market, and Solly proved a discerning buyer, concerned with the provenance and documentation of works he bought, to an extent unusual in his generation. Though he owned one of the finest interior views by Pieter de Hooch and possibly Vermeer's Lady Standing at a Virginal (National Gallery, London), both falling within the desirable contemporary category of "cabinet pictures", he was not drawn to the Seicento and Baroque Old Masters that formed the main other interest of contemporary collectors and connoisseurs, but rather to the early Byzantinising Italian paintings of the 13th and 14th centuries, which had been preserved largely in the churches and monasteries for which they had been commissioned. He had a judicious eye also for early Netherlandish painting: his most famous purchase in that field were the wings of the Ghent Altarpiece of Hubert and Jan van Eyck, which was sold by the cathedral canons soon after it had been returned to Ghent in 1816; Solly purchased the panels through the paintings dealer Nieuwenhuys.

Solly and the firm suffered a major setback when twenty of their merchantmen, running the Napoleonic blockade on behalf of the Allies, were captured by Danes within the Napoleonic system and taken to Copenhagen. Only after years of pressuring was any compensation effected.

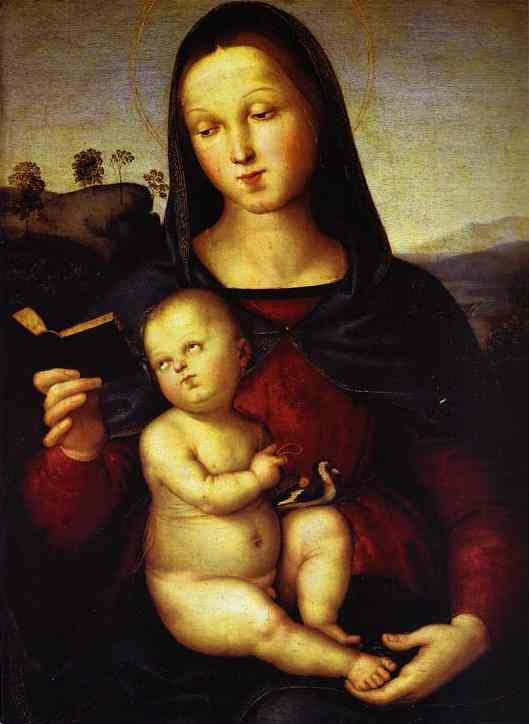
Raphael's Solly Madonna

Solly continued collecting nevertheless, increasingly with the idea that his paintings might be purchased by the Prussian State, to form a public collection. In 1815 Frederick William III had bought the remains of the Giustiniani collection for just such a purpose, but resisted this purchase. Solly's financial situation became straitened. Through the mediation of Benjamin Wegner, a friend and agent of Edward Solly, negotiations on a purchase of the collection by the Prussian state began in 1820, and in 1821 Solly's entire collection of some 3,000 pictures was bought for the newly founded Alte Nationalgalerie. 677 paintings were selected for display in the museum; others were hung in the Hohenzollern palaces to replace those that had been removed to the museum. Though Solly was an early admirer of early Netherlandish painting, Solly's first collection was mostly Italian, including Raphael's Solly Madonna (illustration, right). Under National Socialism, some of Solly's Italian pictures were traded for those by native German masters and, some through Duveen, found their way into the Samuel Henry Kress and Andrew W. Mellon collections; thus Fra Filippo Lippi's Madonna of the Niche and Duccio's Nativity triptych are both now in the National Gallery, Washington.

Following the successful sale that he had urged so long, in 1821 Solly moved to London, where he retired from shipping and dealt in works of art, which filled his house at 7, Curzon Street, Mayfair. His interests narrowed to the High Renaissance. He acted on occasion as advisor to John Bowes, whose collection forms the Bowes Museum. Often sensing himself in financial trouble, in eight London sales between 1825 and 1837 Solly sold paintings, drawings and engravings, according to Frits Lugt, although the records now online through the Getty Provenance Index show a total of 1306 lots in many auctions, with small paintings of the Dutch Golden Age predominating, at least numerically, in a very varied range of works.

When the cream of his collection, those paintings he had reserved for himself, were sold by order of his heirs, his daughters Sarah and Lavinia and his son Edward Solly, at Christie's, 8 May 1847, a few were held back, or "bought in" at the sale when they failed to reach their reserve, as was one of the two works attributed to "Lionardo da Vinci" (sic). Sarah Solly donated five of the paintings to the National Gallery in 1879, including a Portrait of Giovanni della Volta with his Wife and Children by Lorenzo Lotto (bought in at the 1847 sale), and two Dutch Golden Age paintings.
