= The Martyrdom of Saint Barbara (Lucas Cranach the Elder) =

Painting by Lucas Cranach the Elder

Lucas Cranach the Elder
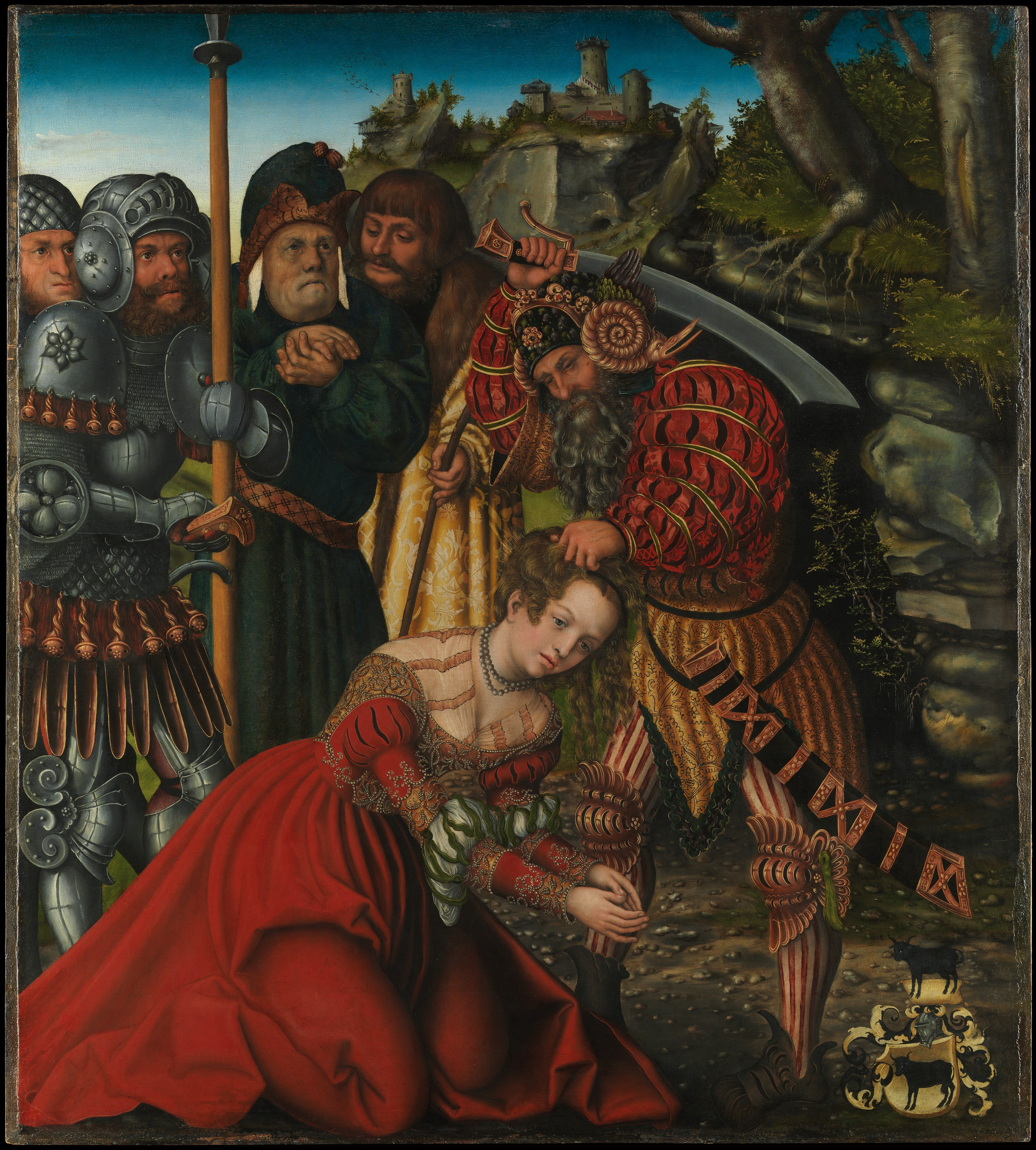
- Artist: Lucas Cranach the Elder
- Year: c. 1510
- Medium: Oil on linden
- Dimensions: 153.4 cm × 137.8 cm (60.4 in × 54.3 in)
- Location: Metropolitan Museum of Art; New York

The Martyrdom of Saint Barbara is an early 16th century painting by German artist Lucas Cranach the Elder. It is in the collection of the Metropolitan Museum of Art, in New York.

The work depicts the martyrdom of Saint Barbara, a Greek princess who was executed by her heathen father Dioscorus at the behest of Roman officials; the execution was in retaliation for Barbara refusing to renounce her Christian faith.
