= A Woman Peeling Apples =

Painting by Pieter de Hooch, c. 1663

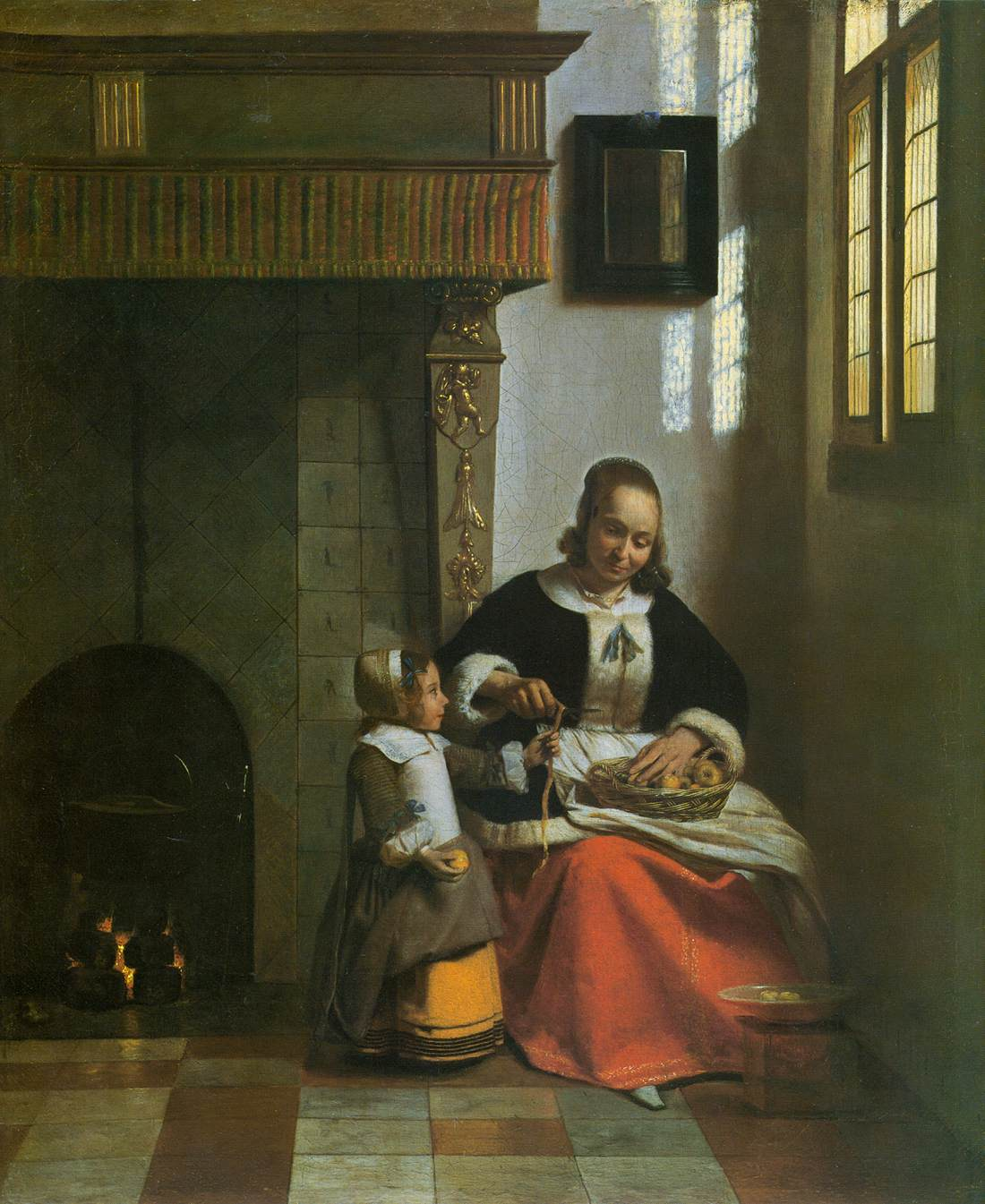
- Artist: Pieter de Hooch
- Year: c. 1663
- Medium: oil on canvas
- Dimensions: 67 cm × 55 cm (26 in × 22 in)
- Location: Wallace Collection; London

A Woman Peeling Apples (c. 1663) is a painting by the Dutch Golden Age painter Pieter de Hooch. It is currently in the Wallace Collection in London.

== Description ==
It is a genre painting showing a quiet domestic scene from the time, like most of de Hooch's works. The elaborate fireplace and fur and embroidery in the mother's clothes show a prosperous household, and the cupid between the two figures implies a happy one. Its sensitive handling of light—in particular, natural light filtered into an otherwise unlit interior space—led 19th-century art historians to attribute it to Johannes Vermeer, with whose work the painting does bear strong similarities. However, Vermeer's work typically portrayed a woman working alone instead of a family scene as in A Woman Peeling Apples. Most scholars also now believe that de Hooch was influenced by Vermeer instead of Vermeer by de Hooch.

The painting is in oil on canvas (67 cm × 55 cm). It is also sometimes referred to as A Woman Peeling Apples, with a Small Child. This painting was documented by Hofstede de Groot in 1908, who wrote:

33. WOMAN PEELING APPLES. de G. 55. In the right-hand corner of a room sits a woman, facing the spectator. She wears a black velvet jacket trimmed with fur, a red skirt, and a white apron. In her lap she holds a basket of apples which she is peeling. She holds out a long rind in her right hand to a little girl standing to the left and seen in profile. A tub is on the floor at the woman's feet. To the left is a fireplace with a kettle on the fire. The fireplace is lined with Delft tiles, and is enclosed with pilasters worked in low relief. Behind the woman hangs a mirror in a black frame. The sunlight enters through a window above to the right and illumines the wall and a corner of the mirror. The floor is composed of brown and white tiles. The picture is in a very dirty condition. Its general effect is fine. It is somewhat similar in style to the Weissbach picture (4), but not so charming in subject; it is Canvas, 26 inches by 21 inches. Mentioned by Waagen, Supplement, p. 87, in the collection of the Marquis of Hertford, who bought it from C. Perrier in 1848 (for £283 : 10s.). Described by Bürger, Gazette des Beaux-Arts, 1866, vol. xxi. p. 561, as a Vermeer, No. 16. Exhibited at the Royal Academy Winter Exhibition, London, 1893, No. 55. Now in the Wallace collection, London, No. 23 in the 1901 catalogue.

== See also ==
- List of paintings by Pieter de Hooch
