= Group Portrait of an Unknown Family or Company =

Painting by Pieter de Hooch

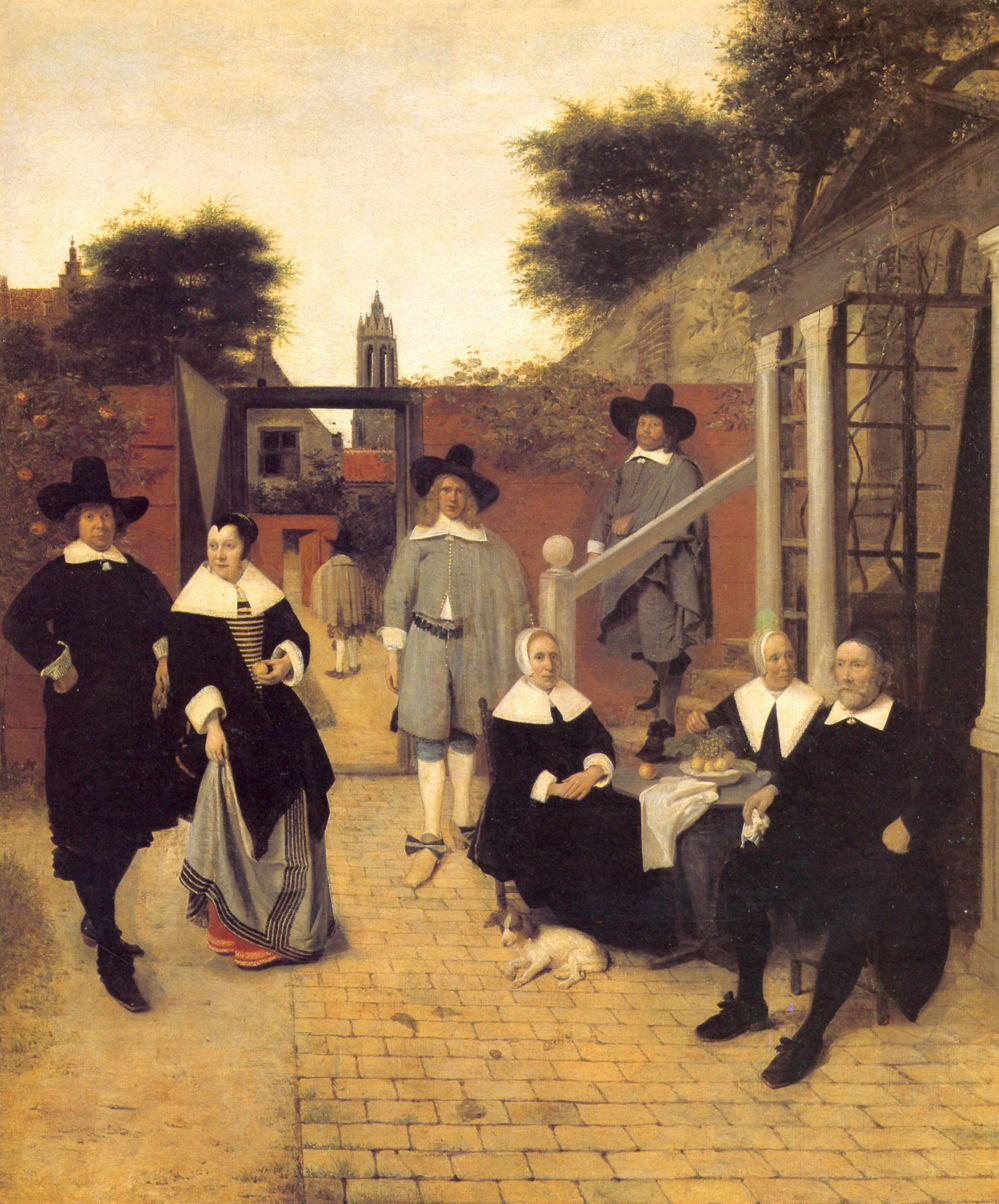
- Artist: Pieter de Hooch
- Year: 1658–1660
- Medium: Oil on canvas
- Dimensions: 52.5 cm × 61 cm (20.7 in × 24 in)
- Location: Academy of Fine Arts Vienna; Vienna

Group Portrait of an Unknown Family or Company (1658–1660) is an oil-on-canvas painting by the Dutch Golden Age painter Pieter de Hooch. It is part of the collection of the Academy of Fine Arts Vienna.

The painting was documented by Hofstede de Groot in 1908, who wrote:

321. FAMILY IN THE COURTYARD OF A HOUSE. De G. 87. Three women and four men are assembled in a courtyard, on the right of which is the town wall. A fifth man is going away through the adjacent garden, upon which a wooden door opens in the middle distance. Three of the principal figures a grey-bearded old man in dark clothes with a black cap, and two elderly women in black with white caps and collars are seated on the righit, in front of an arbour, at a table on which stands a dish of grapes and peaches. On the tiled pavement a watch-dog lies at the feet of one of the women. From the left come a man and a woman; the man is in black, with a broad-brimmed hat, and rests his right hand on his hip; the woman wears a red petticoat trimmed with gold lace, a bodice of brocade, a black hood, and pearls in her hair and ears, and holds a peach in her left hand. Farther back in the middle of the picture stands a fair-haired young man, facing the spectator; he wears a broad-brimmed hat, a light grey doublet and riding-cloak, pale blue breeches, and black and white rosettes on his shoes. An older man, dressed in similar fashion, but more simply, comes down a wooden staircase on the right. The tendrils of a creeper growing on the town wall over-spread the arbour. To the left of it is a rose-tree in full bloom on the fence. In the background are seen some gables and the tower of the Nieuwe Kerk in Delft. The lighting is uniform in quality. Signs of an alteration in the design may be seen to the right of the leg of the man standing on the left; and the old man on the right appears to have been once seated at a lower level. It is a good work of the first period. [Compare 294.] Canvas, 45 1/2 inches by 38 1/2 inches. Long ascribed in error to J. Vermeer by Erasm. Engert, Waagen, and Bürger (Gazette des Beaux-Arts, 1866, p. 550, No. 13). Presented by Graf Lamberg in 1821, as a Terborch, to the Akademie der bildenden Künste, Vienna, where it is No. 715 in the 1900 catalogue.

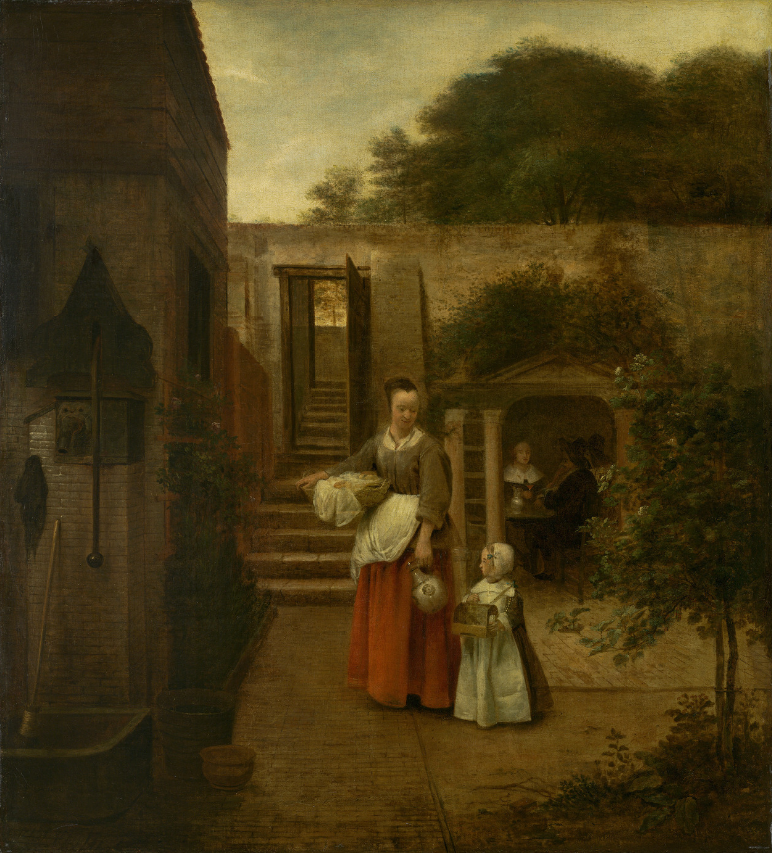
A Woman and Child in a Courtyard, showing the stairs and arbour from another angle (HdG 294)

== See also ==
- List of paintings by Pieter de Hooch
