= A Woman Drinking with Two Men =

1658 Painting by Pieter de Hooch

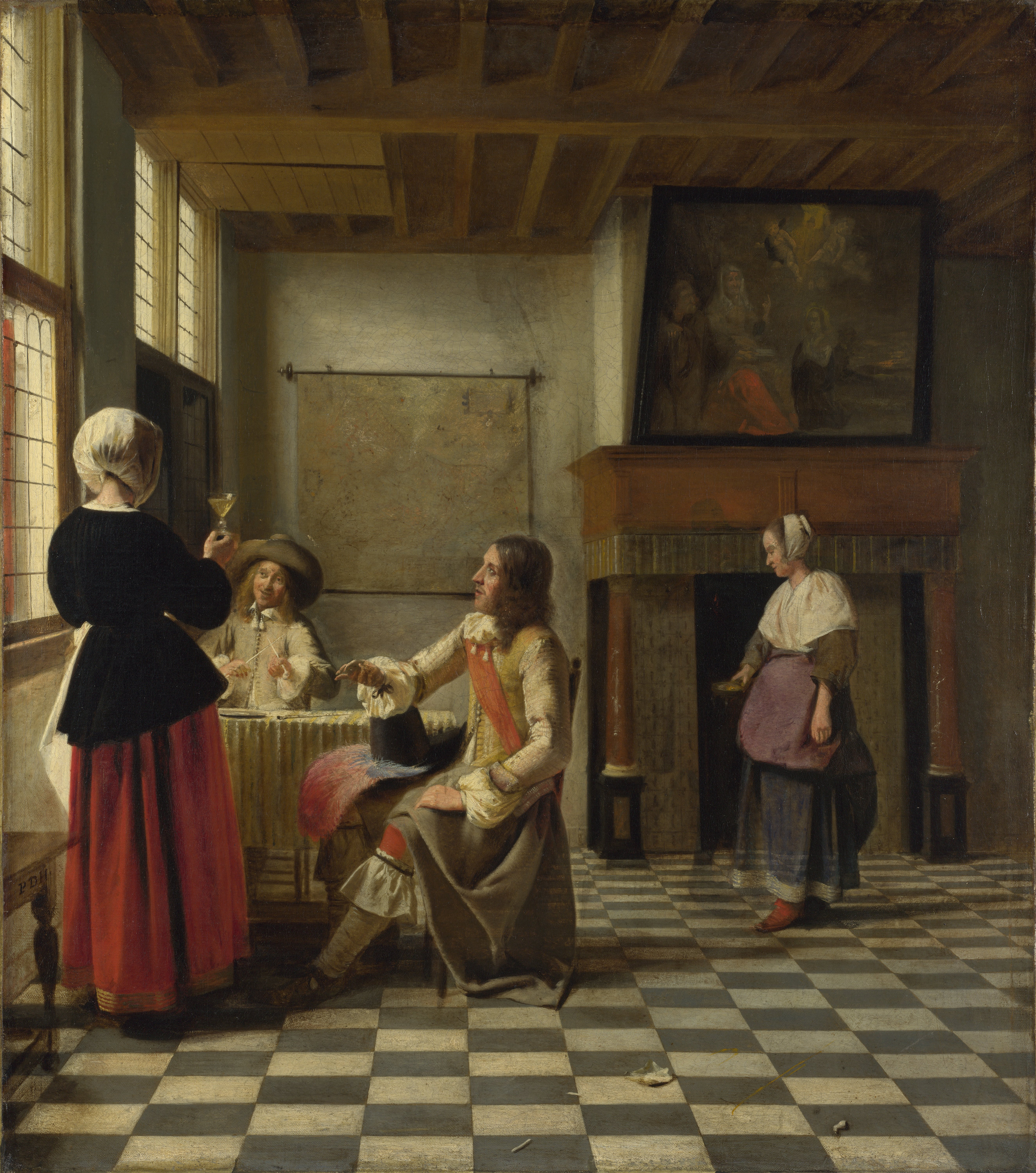
- Artist: Pieter de Hooch
- Year: 1658
- Medium: Oil on canvas
- Dimensions: 73.7 cm × 64.6 cm (29.0 in × 25.4 in)
- Location: National Gallery; London

A Woman Drinking with Two Men is a 1658 painting by Pieter de Hooch, an example of Dutch Golden Age painting and is part of the collection of the National Gallery, London.

The painting was documented by Hofstede de Groot in 1908, who wrote:

183. GIRL WITH TWO CAVALIERS (or, Interior of a Dutch House). Sm. 49.; de G. 37. This painting is Hooch's transformation of Ter Borsch's painting, Gallant Conversation. At a table by a broad double window, to the left of a room with wooden rafters and a pavement or black and white tiles, sit two gentlemen. One, at the farther side of the table, faces the spectator; he wears a hat, and with smiling face holds a pipe in each hand in the attitude of a fiddler. The other, seated before the table in profile to the left, holds his plumed hat on his knee, with his right hand above it. He looks at a girl, with her back to the spectator, who stands close to the window. She holds up a glass of wine in her right hand, as if she were about to give it to the cavalier with the pipes. A servant-girl comes from the right with a pan of burning peat. Behind her is a chimney-piece with two pilasters, above which hangs a large figure-piece. Between the chimney-piece and the window to the left is a map. Signed "P. D. H."; canvas, 29 inches by 25 inches. Mentioned by Waagen (i. 403) in the collection of Sir Robert Peel; and by Ch. Blanc, Le Tresor de la Curiosité (ii. 220).

Sales:

- Seb. Heemskerck, in Amsterdam, March 31, 1749 (Hoet, ii. 251) No. 189 (70 florins).
- Van Leyden, Paris, September 10, 1804 (5500 francs, Paillet).
- Afterwards in the Pourtales collection, in Paris, which was purchased by Smith and Emmerson in 1826; * sold by them to Sir Robert Peel, Bart.
- Purchased for the nation in 1871 with the rest of the Peel collection.

Now in the National Gallery in London, No. 834 in the 1906 catalogue.

A pastiche of this work, called Souvenir of de Hoogh, in watercolour and gouache on paper, by Hercules Brabazon Brabazon is in the Tate collection.

== See also ==
- List of paintings by Pieter de Hooch
