= Young Woman with a Letter and a Messenger in an Interior =

Painting by Pieter de Hooch

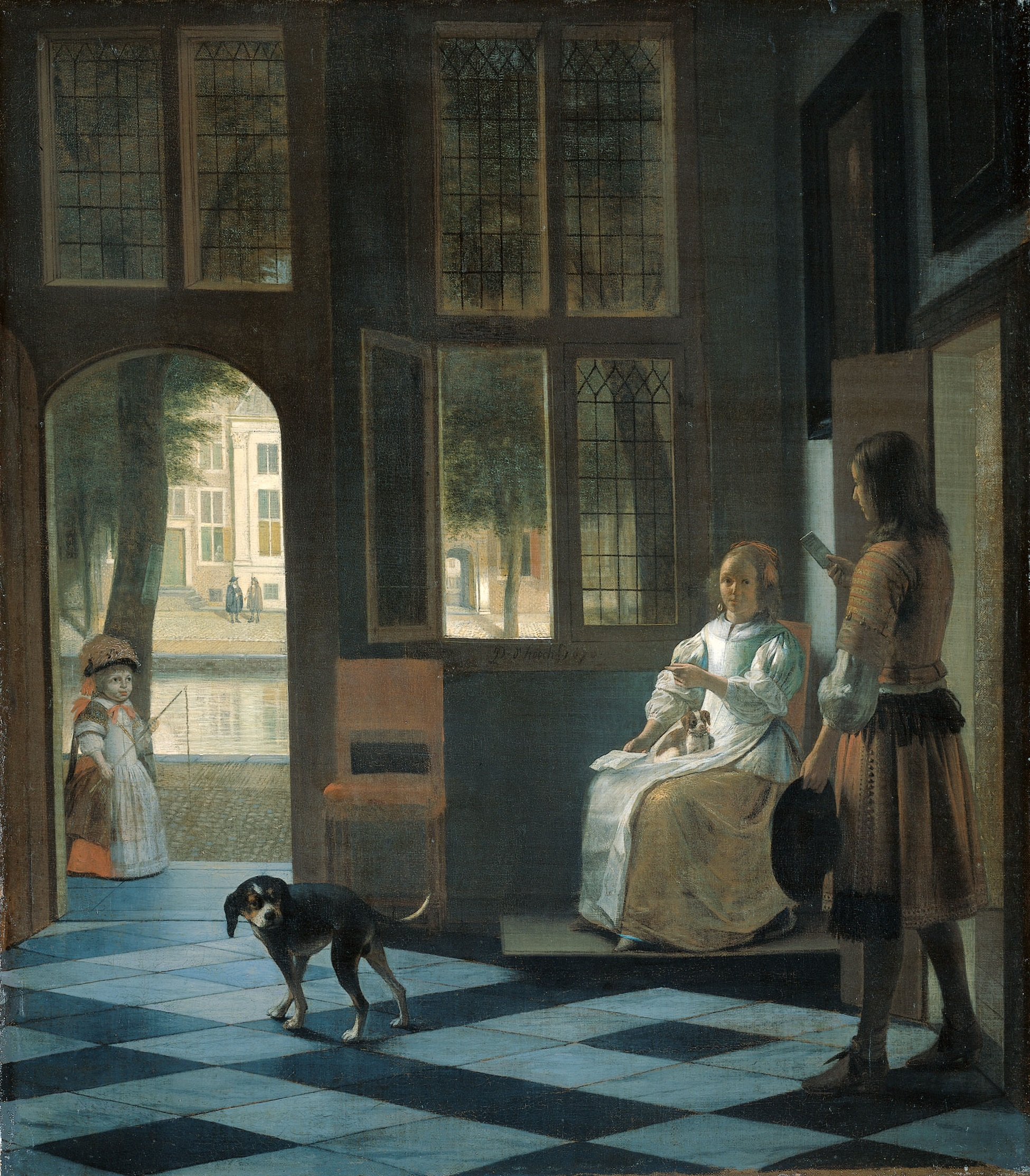
- Artist: Pieter de Hooch
- Year: 1670
- Medium: oil on canvas
- Dimensions: 68 cm × 59 cm (27 in × 23 in)
- Location: Rijksmuseum; Amsterdam

Young Woman with a Letter and a Messenger in an Interior (1670) is an oil-on-canvas painting by the Dutch painter Pieter de Hooch. It is part of the collection of the Rijksmuseum, in Amsterdam.

This painting was documented by Hofstede de Groot in 1908, who wrote:

173. YOUNG LADY IN A VESTIBULE RECEIVING A LETTER. Sm. 51, Suppl. 22; de G. 7. A lady, wearing a light blue jacket and a red skirt, sits in the farther right-hand corner of a vestibule paved with tiles. A dog lies on her lap; a bigger dog stands to the left. Through a door on the right a man-servant, hat in hand, enters with a letter. The scene is lighted from a window and from the street-door on the left, outside of which stands a child with a whip. Through the door are seen the trees by the canal and the sunlit houses on the other side of the street, which is the Kloveniersburgwal in Amsterdam. Signed "P d' hooch f. 1670"; canvas, 27 inches by 23 1/2 inches. A picture of similar dimensions was sold at the Leers sale (201), but this may be the picture formerly in the Hope collection in London (195).

Sales:

- (Possibly) J. Caudri, Amsterdam, September 6, 1809, No. 24 (31 florins, Dupre); but this only measured 22 inches by 20-3 inches. [Compare 182.]
- Madame Camper, Leyden, 1827 (bought in at 4000 florins).
- Meijnders, 1838 (3311 florins).

Afterwards in the Van der Hoop collection, No. 50 in the 1876 catalogue.

Now in the Rijksmuseum at Amsterdam, Van der Hoop bequest; No. 1249 in the 1905 catalogue (formerly No. 682).

== See also ==
- List of paintings by Pieter de Hooch
