= Interior of a Kitchen with a Woman, a Child and a Maid =

Painting by Pieter de Hooch

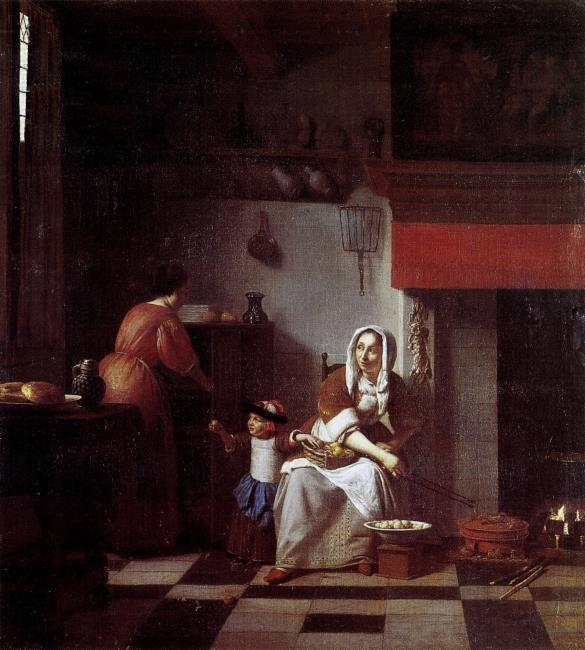
- Artist: Pieter de Hooch
- Year: c. 1668–1672
- Medium: oil on canvas
- Dimensions: 70 cm × 63.5 cm (28 in × 25.0 in)
- Location: Private collection

Interior of a Kitchen with a Woman, a Child and a Maid (c. 1668–1672) is an oil-on-canvas painting by the Dutch painter Pieter de Hooch. It is an example of Dutch Golden Age painting and is part of a private collection.

This painting was documented by Hofstede de Groot in 1908, who wrote:

38. WOMAN PEELING PEARS, WITH A CHILD AND A SERVANT-GIRL. Sm. 14. A woman sits beside a fireplace near the middle of the picture, facing the spectator. She has a basket of pears in her lap. To her left is a little child showing a pear to a servant-girl who, seen in full light, but with her back turned to the spectator, is taking something out of a press. The woman, who is speaking to the girl, wears a little red jacket trimmed with fur, a tucked-up apron, and a white kerchief; at her feet on the right is a dish of fruit. Beside her on the right is the fireplace, in which a kettle hangs over a peat fire. Above hangs a picture of Lot in his drunkenness. To the left is a shelf with plates and hanging jugs. The light comes through a window draped with red curtains on the left, and illumines also a plate of bread and a jug which stand on a table in the left foreground as well as the tiles of the floor. Signed: "P de Hooch"; canvas, 27 1/2 inches by 25 inches. Sales, P. Locquet, September 22, 1783, No. 183 (220 florins, Gildemeester). J. Gildemeester Jansz, in Amsterdam, June n, 1800 (185 florins, or £17, Roos). E. W. Lake, London, 1845 (£66, Nieuwenhuis). Berger, in London, June 16, 1900, No. 108 (£1102: IDS., Dowdeswell). In the catalogue of 100 paintings, in the possession of the dealer Ch. Sedelmeyer of Paris, 1901, No. 20.

According to the RKD, it was sold from the Gutmann collection in 1987.

== See also ==
- List of paintings by Pieter de Hooch
