= Company in a Courtyard Behind a House =

Painting by Pieter de Hooch

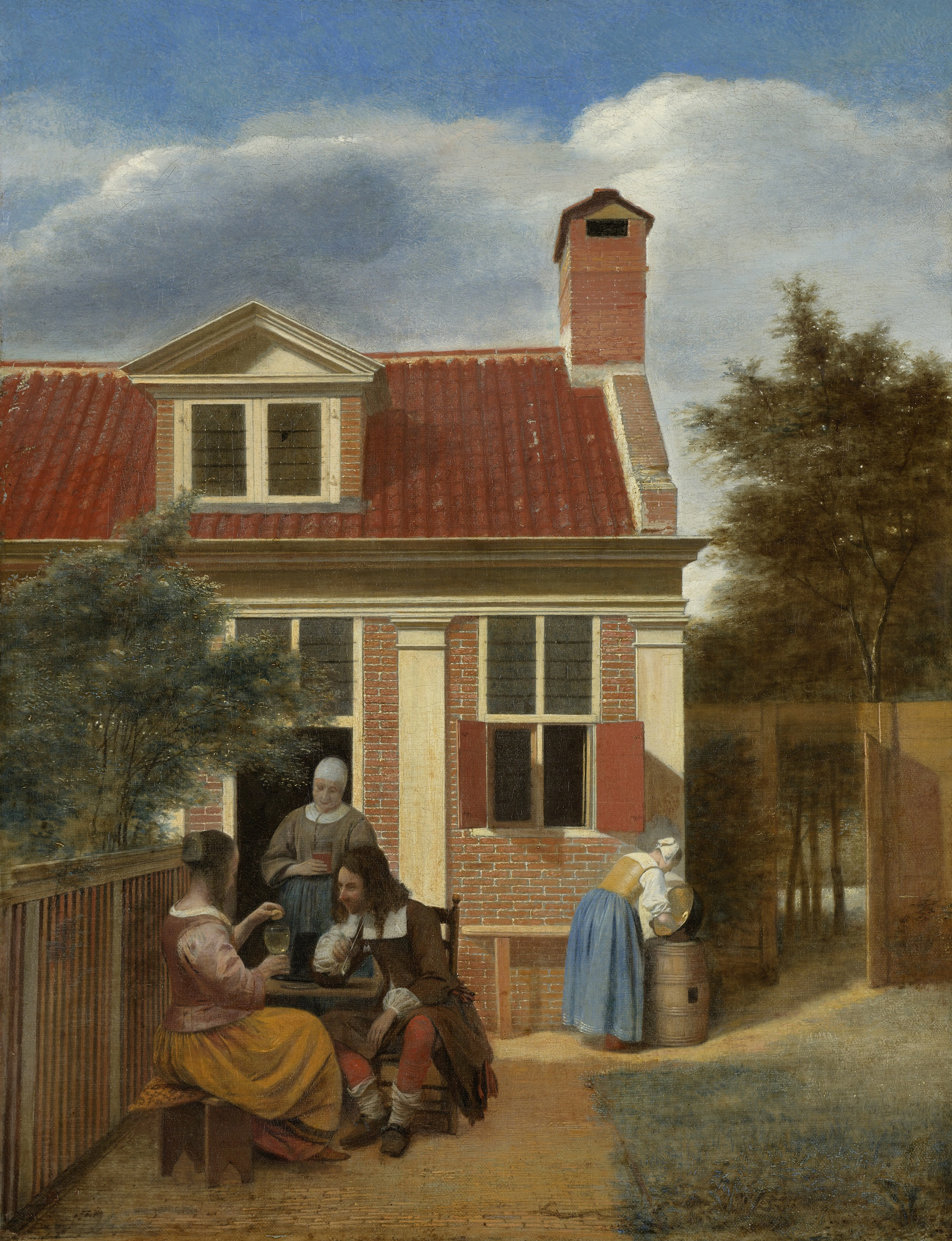
- Artist: Pieter de Hooch
- Year: 1663–1665
- Medium: oil on canvas
- Dimensions: 61 cm × 47 cm (24 in × 19 in)
- Location: Amsterdam Museum on loan to the Rijksmuseum, Amsterdam
- Website: Amsterdam Collection online

Company in a Courtyard Behind a House (1663–1665) is an oil-on-canvas painting by the Dutch painter Pieter de Hooch. It is an example of Dutch Golden Age painting and is part of the collection of the Amsterdam Museum, on loan to the Rijksmuseum.

The painting was documented in 1910 by Hofstede de Groot, who wrote:

286. SCENE IN A COURTYARD BEFORE A SMALL HOUSE (or, The Lovers). Sm. 61; Suppl. 25; de G. 6. In front of a small house with a red roof, red brick walls, and white pilasters, a gentleman and a lady, in a red jacket and yellow skirt, are seated at a small table. The lady, sitting almost with her back to the spectator, is squeezing a lemon into a glass of wine. The gentleman, with his pipe in his right hand, looks on with interest. Behind the couple an older woman comes forward with a glass of beer. At the corner of the house to the right a servant-girl, standing on a tub, is scouring a brass pot. To the right is a wooden fence with an open garden-door, above which rise some trees. To the left of the group is a hedge with trees beyond. It is a fine and early work, dating from about 1660–65. "The brilliant sunshine of a fine afternoon lends a peculiar charm to the scene" (Sm.).

Signed on the bank to the left, "P D HOOG"; canvas, 24 inches by 18 1/2 inches. Imported into England by Chaplin. In the O'Niel collection in 1832, and in the Van der Hoop collection, Amsterdam, in 1842.

Now in the Rijksmuseum, Amsterdam, Van der Hoop bequest, No. 1251 in the 1903 catalogue (formerly No. 686).

== See also ==
- List of paintings by Pieter de Hooch
