= The Maidservant =

Painting by Pieter de Hooch

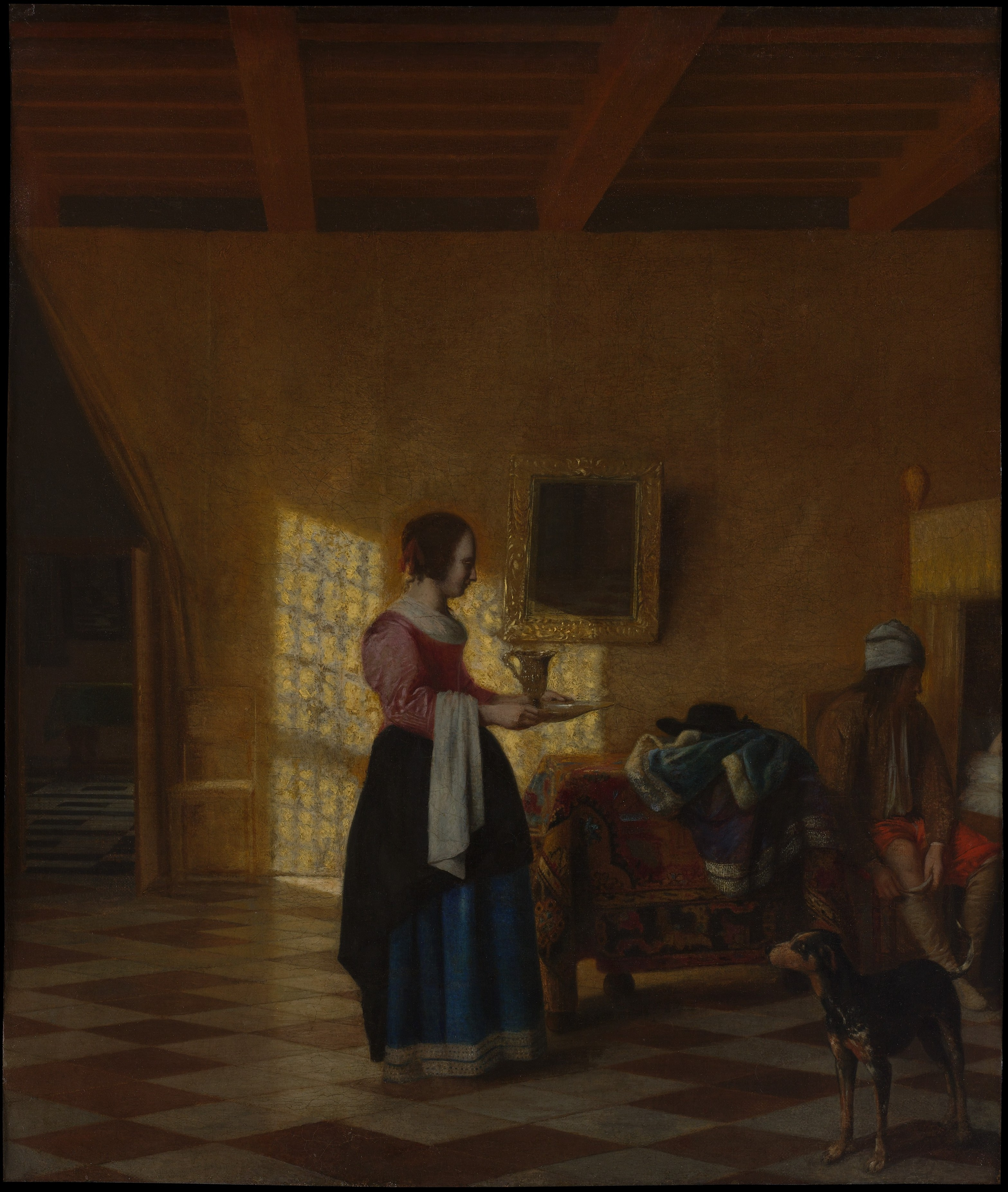
- Artist: Pieter de Hooch
- Year: c. 1667–1670
- Medium: oil on panel
- Dimensions: 61.5 cm × 52.1 cm (24.2 in × 20.5 in)
- Location: Metropolitan Museum of Art; New York

The Maidservant (formerly Gentleman and Lady in a Bedroom) (c. 1667–1670) is an oil-on-panel painting by the Dutch painter Pieter de Hooch. It is held in the Metropolitan Museum of Art, in New York.

== Description ==
The painting was documented by Hofstede de Groot in 1908, who wrote:

80. Gentleman and Lady in a Bedroom. To the right a lady in bed converses with her husband who is sitting in his night-gown on a chair, pulling on his stockings. A fur-trimmed cape and a hat lie near him on a table covered with a cloth. In the foreground a comely servant-girl stands, holding with both hands a dish and a mug. An open door looks into another room; the sun shines on the wall. Canvas, 22 inches by 27 inches. Sale. Aron de Joseph de Pinto, in Amsterdam, April n, 1785, No. 2.

== History ==
According to the Met website, the painting has been cut down to remove a woman lying in bed (mentioned in de Groot's description), and the man next to the bed was previously painted over. As the central figure is now the maidservant, it is logical that the title was changed. The provenance of the painting is as follows:

- Aron de Joseph de Pinto (until 1785; his sale, [Amsterdam], April 11, 1785, no. 2, for fl. 45 to Van der Schley [one of the organizers of the sale]);
- Van Helsleuter, Paris;
- [Henry Héris, Brussels, until 1839; sold for Fr 6,000 to Brié];
- Colonel Brié, Brussels (1839–41; his anonymous sale, organized by Héris, Hôtel rue des Jeuneurs, 16, Paris, March 25, 1841, no. 12, for Fr 5,950);
- Mawson (until 1850; his anonymous sale, rue des Jeuneurs, 42, Paris, February 22–23, 1850, no. 31, for Fr 1,980);
- Mr. Arnold, New York (in 1851);
- H. A. Hammond Smith, New York (until 1916; sold to Kleinberger on March 9];
- [Kleinberger, New York, 1916–17; sold for $22,000 to Friedsam]; Michael Friedsam, New York (1917–d. 1931)

== See also ==
- List of paintings by Pieter de Hooch
