= A Woman and Two Men in an Arbour =

Painting by Pieter de Hooch

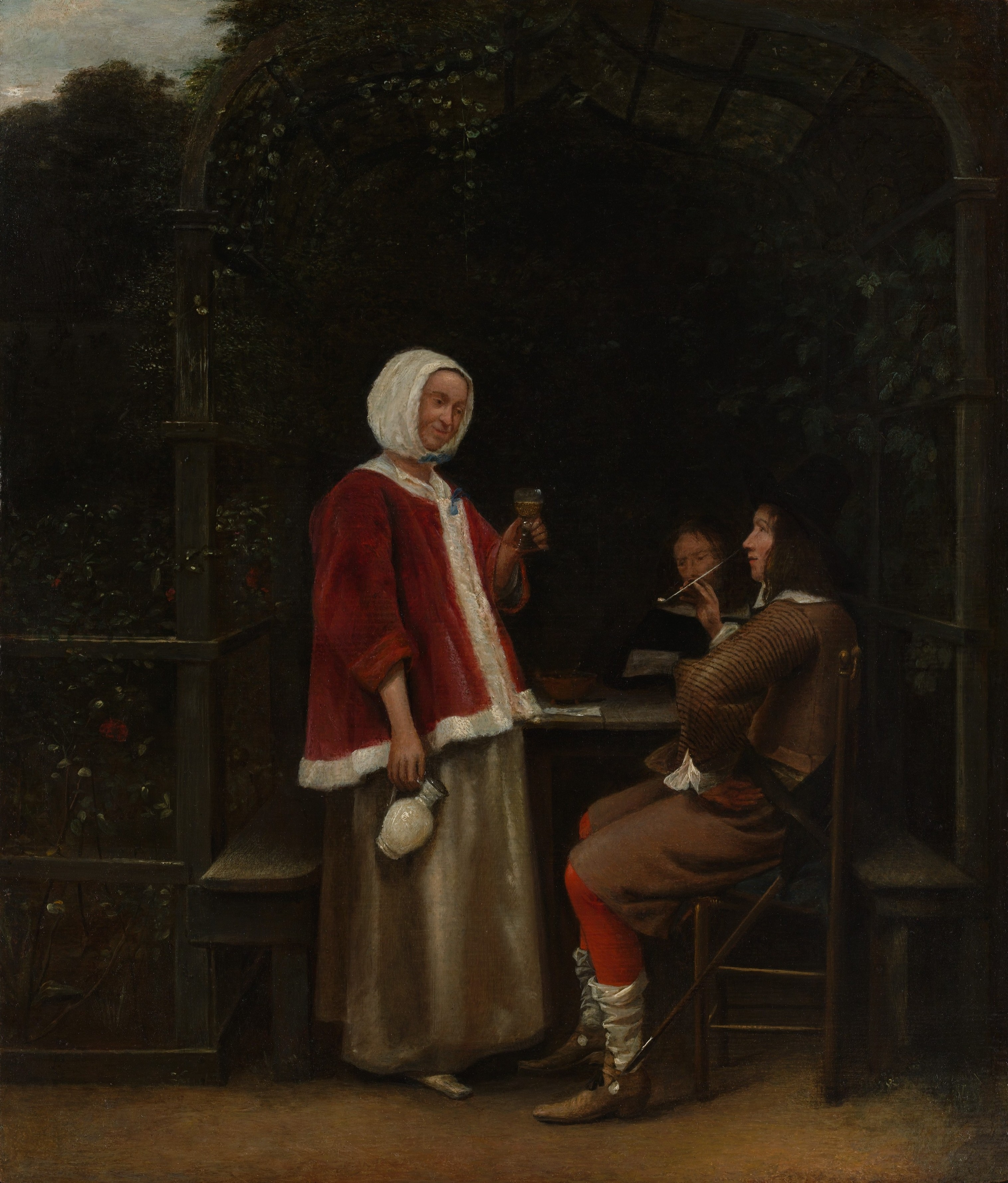
- Artist: Pieter de Hooch
- Year: 1657
- Medium: Oil on panel
- Dimensions: 43.2 cm × 36.5 cm (17.0 in × 14.4 in)
- Location: Metropolitan Museum of Art; New York

A Woman and Two Men in an Arbour (1657) is an oil-on-panel painting by the Dutch painter Pieter de Hooch; it is an example of Dutch Golden Age painting and is now in the Metropolitan Museum of Art, in New York.

== Description ==
This painting was documented by Hofstede de Groot in 1908, who wrote:

306. Man and Woman in an Arbour. To the right are a man and a woman in an arbour. He is seated, quietly smoking a pipe, which he holds in his right hand; he wears red breeches, white gaiters, and light brown shoes. Before him, to the left, stands the woman, in a red jacket trimmed with fur; she has a glass in her left hand and a jug in her right, and seems to be about to drink his health. The house is not represented, and there is no vista. Dr. Bredius considers the picture genuine.

Formerly in the Sellar collection, London. Sale. D. Sellar, London, June 6, 1889, or March 17, 1894.

- 306a. A Lady and a Cavalier. With the landlord in the courtyard of an inn. 17 1/2 inches by 15 inches.
- Sales. Sir Henry Meysey Thompson and others, in London, March 16, 1901, No. 82. Duke of Marl borough and others, London, May 14, 1904, No. 50.

Hofstede de Groot discounts the presence of the third man (the landlord) entirely in his title. Perhaps the face was too dark to see, and that is why he assigned the number "306a" to the sales catalog entry, in case it was a separate picture.

== Provenance ==
According to the MET's museum website, the provenance of the painting is as follows:

- David P. Sellar, London (until 1894; sale, Christie's, London, March 17, 1894, no. 111, for £105 to A. Smith);
- M. van Slochem, New York (in 1912);
- M. van Gelder, Uccle, near Brussels (in 1929);
- John Ringling, Sarasota (until 1930; sold to Böhler);
- [Julius Böhler, Munich, 1930; sold to Neuerburg];
- Hermann Neuerburg, Hamburg (from 1930);
- Gottfried Neuerburg, Cologne (until 1961; sold to Böhler);
- [Julius Böhler, Munich, 1961–1967; sold to Kleinberger];
- [Kleinberger, New York, 1967–1975; bequeathed by Harry G. Sperling, last surviving partner of firm, to MMA].

== See also ==
- List of paintings by Pieter de Hooch
