= Leisure Time in an Elegant Setting =

Painting by Pieter de Hooch

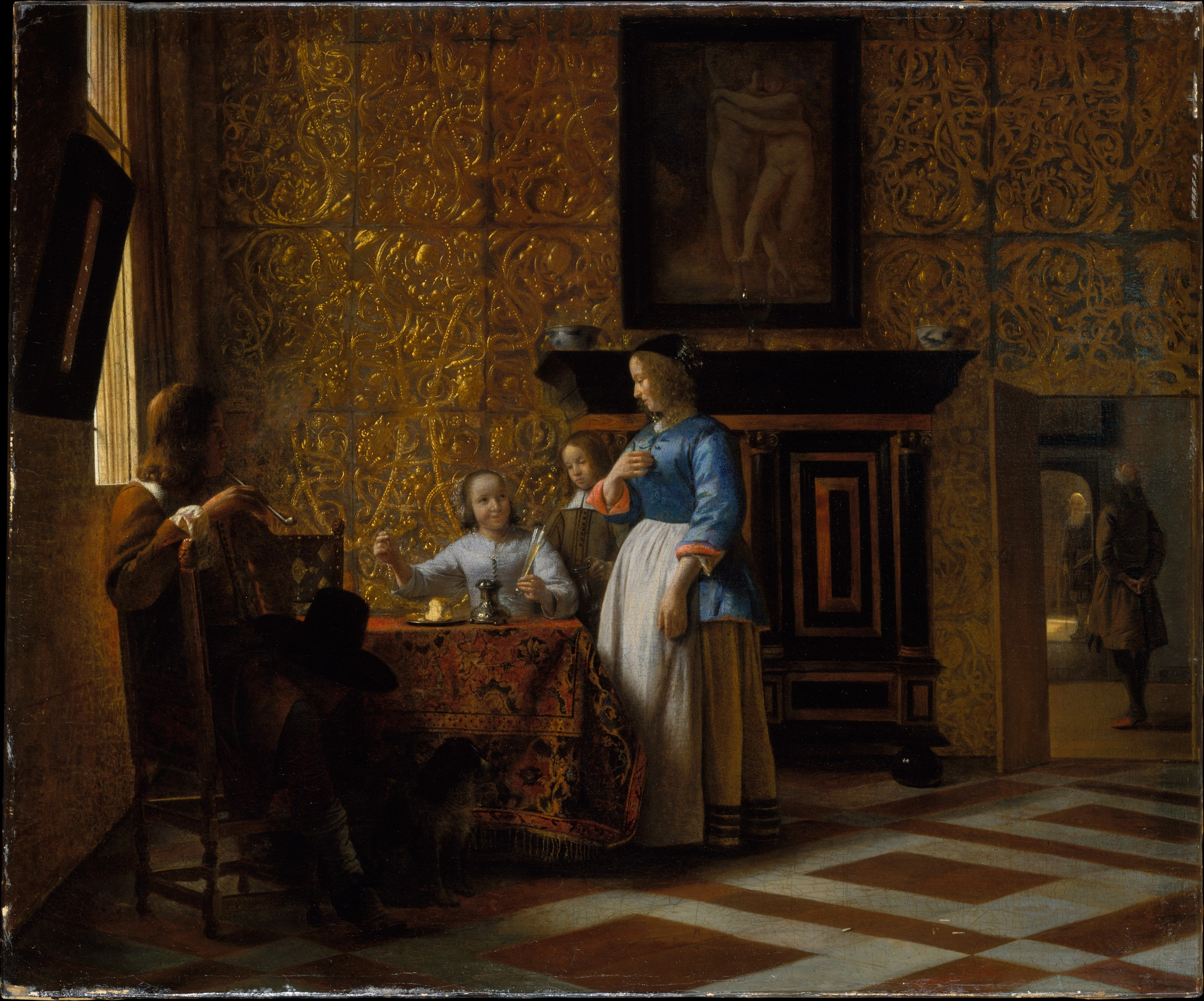
- Artist: Pieter de Hooch
- Year: c. 1663–1665
- Medium: Oil on canvas
- Dimensions: 58.3 cm × 69.4 cm (23.0 in × 27.3 in)
- Location: Metropolitan Museum of Art; New York
- Accession: 1975.1.144

Leisure Time in an Elegant Setting is a painting by Dutch artist Pieter de Hooch, created c. 1663–1665. Done in oil on canvas, the painting depicts the interior of a Dutch home and two distinct conversations taking place. Leisure is in the collection of the Metropolitan Museum of Art, in New York.

== Description ==
A noted painter during the Dutch Golden Age, Pieter de Hooch was especially skilled in the rendering of interior scenes. This skill can be seen in Leisure's richly decorated rooms, gilt-leather wall coverings and use of lighting. The painting also plays with the varying nature of conversations – showing a jovial, well-lit conversation (left) and a more mysterious conversation (right).

The painting was donated to the Met as part of the Robert Lehman Collection in 1975, and remains in the collection of the museum.

== See also ==
- List of paintings by Pieter de Hooch
