= A Boy Bringing Bread =

Painting by Pieter de Hooch

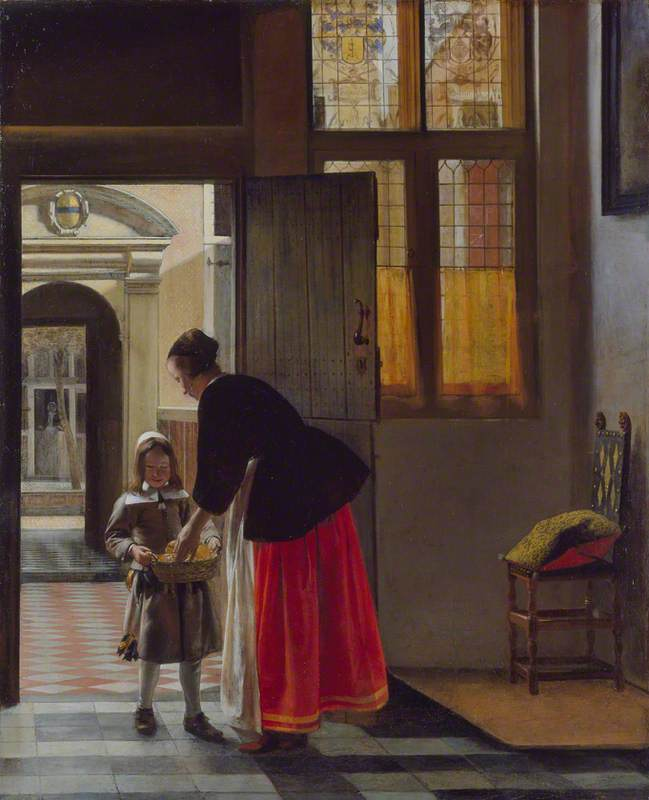
- Artist: Pieter de Hooch
- Year: c. 1663
- Medium: oil on canvas
- Dimensions: 74.5 cm × 60 cm (29.3 in × 24 in)
- Location: The Wallace Collection; London

A Boy Bringing Bread (c. 1663) is an oil-on-canvas painting by the Dutch painter Pieter de Hooch. It is an example of Dutch Golden Age painting and is part of The Wallace Collection, on display at East Galleries II in London. The painting was likely painted soon after De Hooch's arrival in Amsterdam from Delft in the early 1660s.

== Description ==
A boy is depicted, presenting a basket of bread to a lady in the doorway, situated in the street-facing room of a Dutch row house. Positioned behind them, a tiled courtyard extends to a passage, where a second woman, potentially the boy's mother, observes from across a canal. De Hooch specialized in portraying such perspectival views across multiple spaces within domestic settings, offering a window into the lives of Dutch families in the seventeenth century.

Consistent with his artistic approach, de Hooch employed drawn perspective techniques by strategically placing a pin at the vanishing point. The resulting hole is visibly discernible on the door jamb at the canvas's extreme left, allowing the naked eye to identify it. The convergence of the principal lines in the composition emphasizes this point.

The painting originally included a girl reading in the doorway, however she was later painted out in favour of the woman and the boy. The inclusion of the boy as a motif in the painting served as a means for the artist to establish a narrative connection. This deliberate choice encourages viewers to trace the visual narrative from the boy to the distant female figure, enhancing the overall storytelling aspect of the artwork. The boy, wearing a white cap, grey jacket, and adorned with coloured ribbons serves as the main centerpiece, visually contrasting the woman taking the bread who wears a black velvet jacket and red silk skirt, dominating the colour of the scene.

Documented by Hofstede de Groot in 1908, the painting also features a coat-of-arms over the doorway; a "or, a fess azure". The window coat-of-arms feature inscriptions, with "Cornelis Jansz" or "Jac." on the left and "Marnie" or "Maerti" on the right. On the left side, the monogram of the man's family consists of an "M" with a rising shaft bearing a small "c" and ending in a "4." On the right side, the woman's family monogram is enclosed in a lozenge, comprising a shaft with two cross strokes above and two strokes meeting at an angle below, with an "M" on the left and a "C" on the right.

== History of ownership ==
Sources note the first record of sale in 1803, being sold by Maria Theresa Andrioli in Amsterdam. Later the painting is recorded as in possession of Baron van Brienen van Groote Lindt, being sold to Richard Seymour-Conway, 4th Marquess of Hertford in 1865. Following his death, the Marquess' collection was left to his illegitimate son, whose widow, Julie Amelie Charlotte Castelnau, bequethed the collection to the nation. The collection is now open to the public with free entry.

== See also ==
- List of paintings by Pieter de Hooch
