= Interior with a Young Couple and a Dog =

Painting by Pieter de Hooch

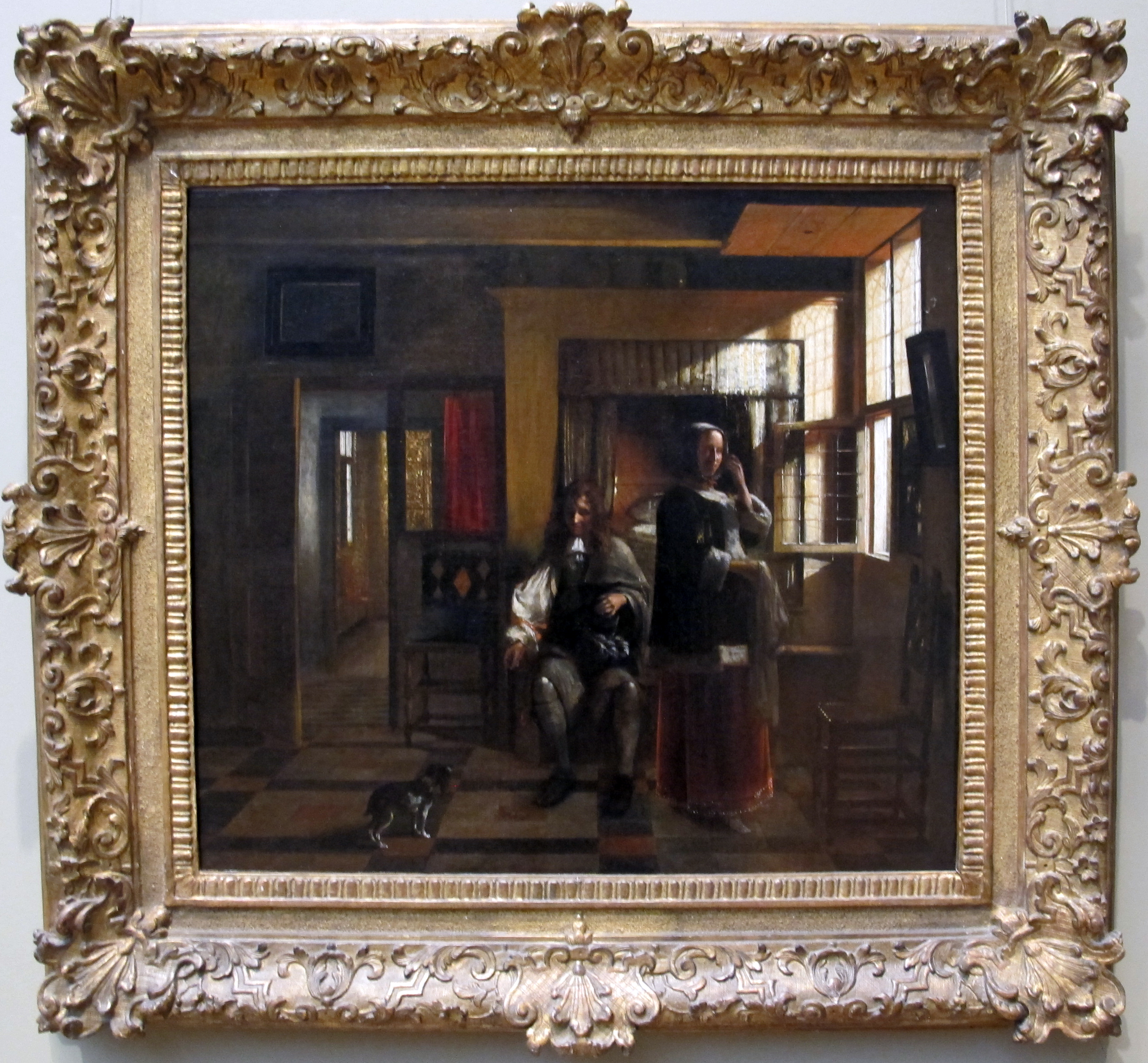
- Artist: Pieter de Hooch
- Year: 1662
- Medium: oil on panel
- Dimensions: 54.9 cm × 62.9 cm (21.6 in × 24.8 in)
- Location: Metropolitan Museum of Art; New York

Interior with a Young Couple and a Dog (1662) is an oil-on-panel painting by the Dutch painter Pieter de Hooch. It is an example of Dutch Golden Age painting and is now in the Metropolitan Museum of Art in New York City.

This painting was documented by Hofstede de Groot in 1910, who wrote:

74. TWO FIGURES AND A DOG IN A BEDROOM. De G. 71. A woman stands at a window to the right; a man sits to her left beckoning to a dog. On the left is visible another room with gilt leather hangings. On the right is a bed, resembling that of the Rijksmuseum picture from the Van der Hoop collection (71), and having similar green curtains. This picture also is of the best period, about 1665, and recalls the larger picture in the Louvre (255). The figures are stiff. Canvas (?), 21 inches by 23 1/2 inches. In the collection of the late Rodolphe Kann in Paris purchased as a whole by Duveen Brothers of London, August 1907.

== See also ==
- List of paintings by Pieter de Hooch
