= Merry Company with Two Men and Two Women =

Painting by Pieter de Hooch

- The Visit
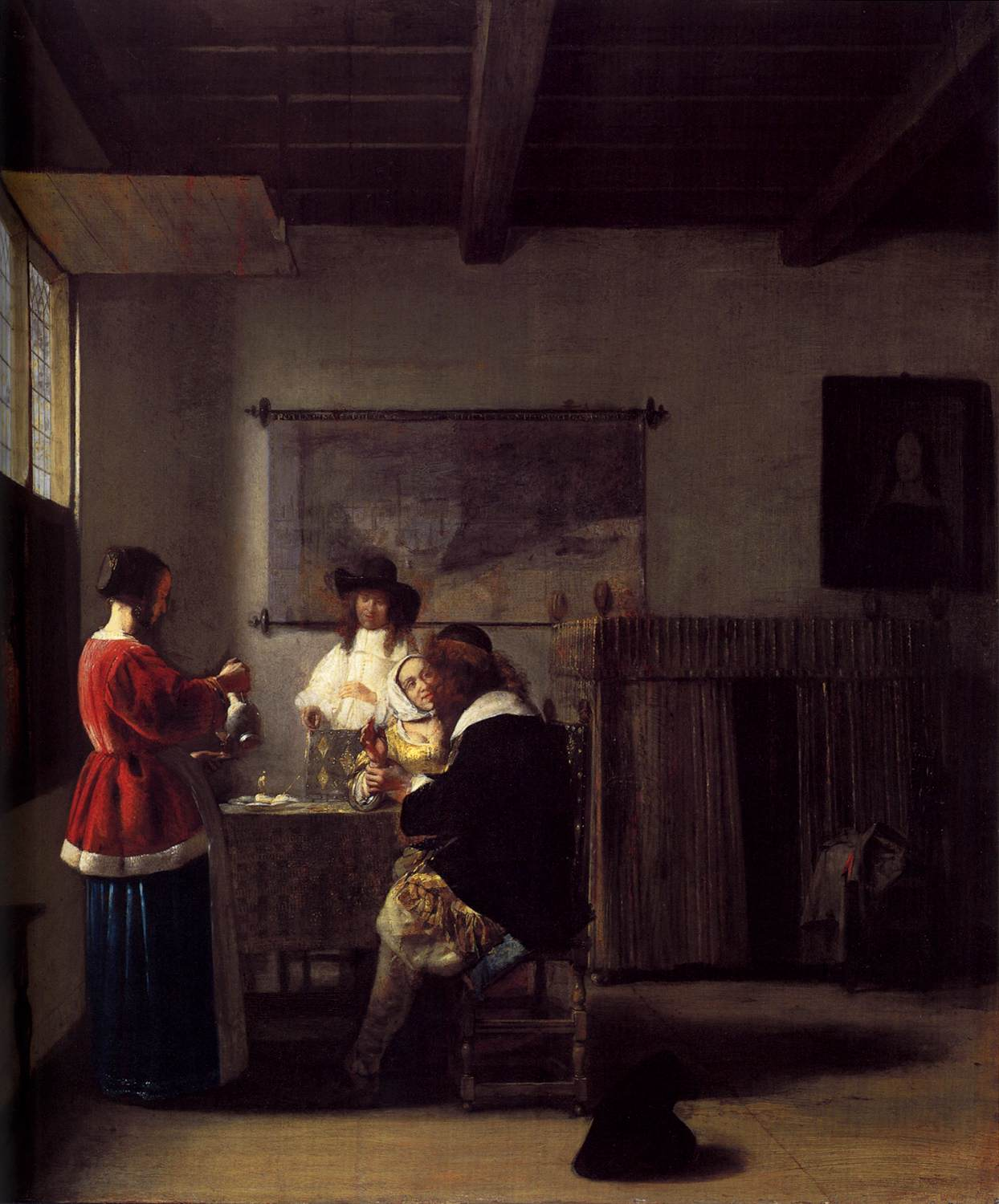
- Artist: Pieter de Hooch
- Year: c. 1657
- Medium: Oil on panel
- Dimensions: 68 cm × 58 cm (27 in × 23 in)
- Location: Metropolitan Museum of Art; New York

Merry Company with Two Men and Two Women, also known as The Visit, is an oil-on-panel painting by the Dutch painter Pieter de Hooch, created c. 1657. It is an example of a Merry Company, a popular form of genre painting in Dutch Golden Age painting showing a group of figures, who are not meant to be identified as portraits, enjoying each other's company. It is now in the Metropolitan Museum of Art, in New York.

The painting was documented by Hofstede de Groot in 1910, who wrote:

192. TWO LADIES AND TWO GENTLEMEN IN AN INTERIOR. Sm. 34. The party are assembled in the left-hand corner of a room, beside a large window, the upper part of which is fastened back. At the left corner of the table stands a girl, pouring out wine; she wears a red jacket trimmed with white fur, a blue skirt, and a large white apron. A young gentleman, wearing a white costume, with a broad collar and a slouch hat, stands behind the table looking at the girl; he leans with his right hand on a chair-back, and holds a pipe in his left. To the right of the table sits a gentleman in a black cape with long curls which conceal his profile; he takes the arm of a girl, who sits beside him and regards him with a watchful and mischievous look. In the right foreground lies his slouch hat. In the background to the right is a bed with curtains; above it hangs a portrait of a man, on the left of which is a map of a Dutch harbour with an inscription. The light falls from the left. It is a good picture, powerful and luminous in the rendering of light and colour. Burger regarded it as a Vermeer; see Gazette des Beaux-Arts for 1866, p. 551, No. 14. Panel, 27 inches by 22 1/2 inches.

In the collection of Baron Delessert, 1833 (Sm.). Sales. Francois Delessert, Paris, May 15, 1869, No. 36 (150,000 francs). B. Narischkine, Paris, April 5, 1883 (160,000 francs).

Secrétan, Paris, July 1, 1889 (270,000 francs). Afterwards in the possession of Durand-Ruel of Paris. Now in the Havemeyer collection in New York.

== See also ==
- List of paintings by Pieter de Hooch
