= Two Women Beside a Linen Chest, with a Child =

Painting by Pieter de Hooch

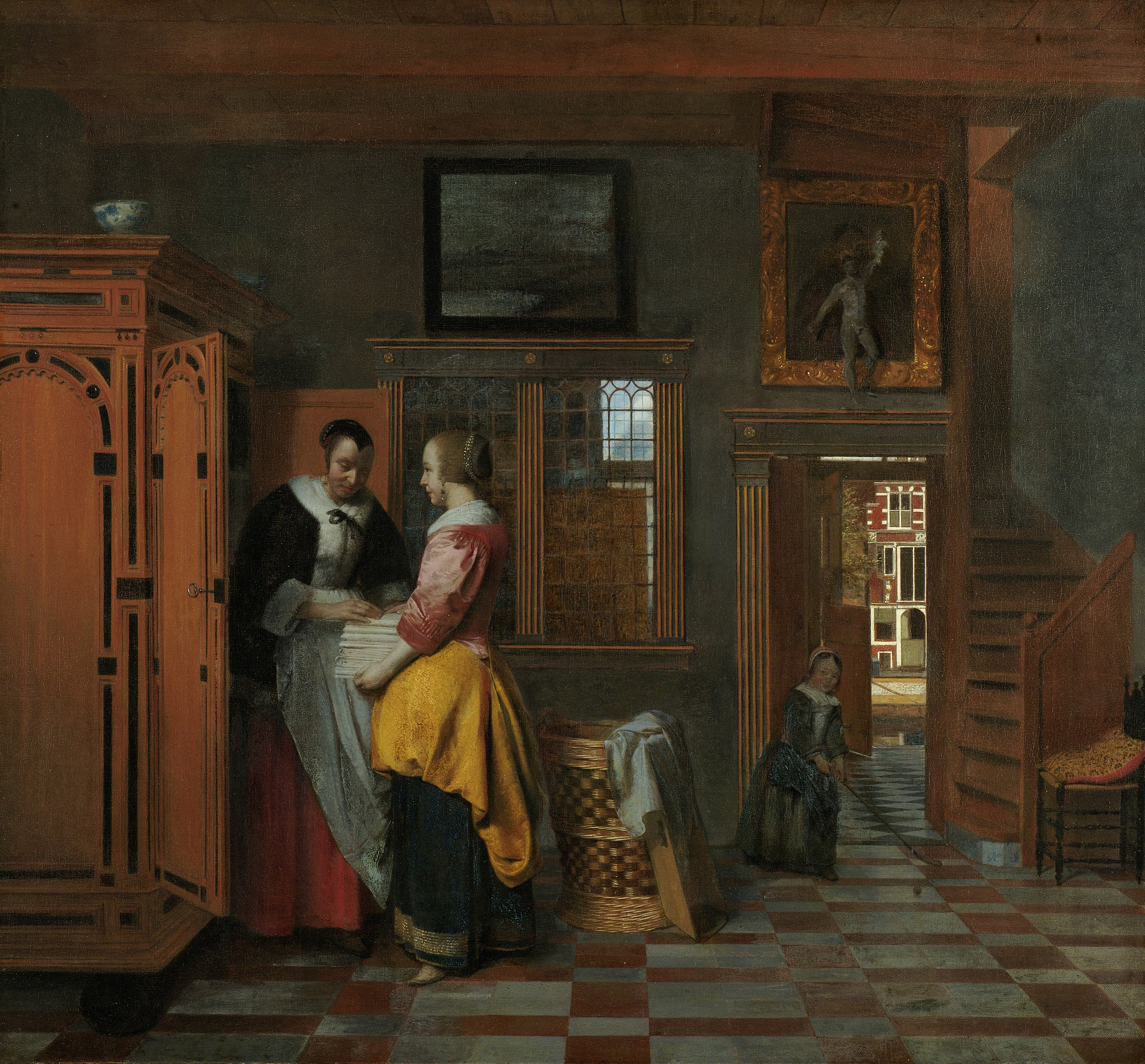
- Artist: Pieter de Hooch
- Year: 1663
- Medium: oil on canvas
- Dimensions: 72 cm × 77.5 cm (28 in × 30.5 in)
- Location: Amsterdam Museum on loan to the Rijksmuseum; Amsterdam
- Website: Amsterdam Collection online

Two Women Beside a Linen Chest, with a Child is an oil-on-canvas painting by the Dutch painter Pieter de Hooch, created in 1663. It is part of the collection of the Amsterdam Museum, on loan to the Rijksmuseum.

The painting was documented by Hofstede de Groot in 1908, who wrote:

25. THE GOOD HOUSEWIFE. Sm. Suppl. 38.; de G. 13. A woman is putting away linen in a great oak press, inlaid with ebony, which stands to the right in a room. A girl, who, to judge from her fine clothes, is the woman's daughter, is helping her and taking the linen from a large basket. At the back are a high window and an open door, at which stands a child playing with a stick and a ball. A winding staircase and a cushioned chair are seen to the left of the room.

Although this picture does not possess the brilliant and luminous effect which is so much coveted in this master's works, yet it has the charm of such truth and reality in appearance that it may justly be reckoned among his best works; the drawing and finishing are singularly perfect (Sm.). Signed "P. de Hoogh, 1663"; canvas, 30 inches by 28 inches.

Exhibited at Amsterdam in 1872, No. 110, and 1900, No. 46. See Harvard, Merveilles d'Art, pp. 57, 123. Sales:

- Baron Lockhorst, in Rotterdam, 1726.
  - Joachim Rendorp, October 16, 1793, and July 9, 1794, No. 25 (295 florins, Coders); catalogued as on panel.
- Bought by Sm., after passing through the hands of a Scottish owner, for 5-
- Sale. Smith, 1828 (399, bought in).
- In the collection of Six van Hillegom, Amsterdam, 1833 (Sm.).

== See also ==
- List of paintings by Pieter de Hooch
