= Card Players in a Rich Interior =

1663–1665 painting by Pieter de Hooch

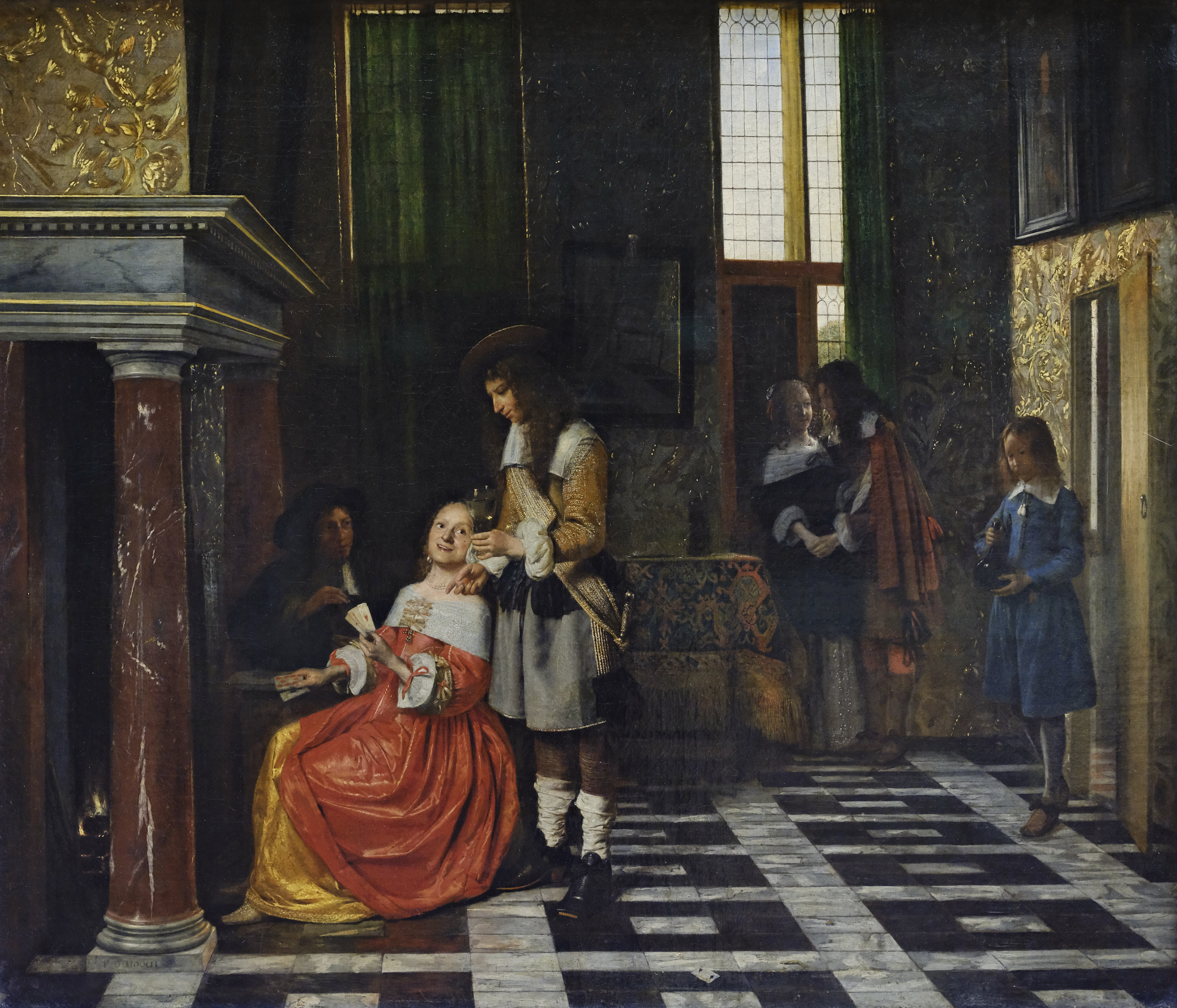
- Artist: Pieter de Hooch
- Medium: oil on canvas
- Dimensions: 67 cm × 77 cm (26 in × 30 in)
- Location: Louvre, Paris

Card Players in a Rich Interior is a c. 1663–1665 oil painting on canvas by the Dutch painter Pieter de Hooch, produced at the start of his time in Amsterdam and signed "P. D. HOOCH". It is now in the Louvre, whose collections it entered in 1801.

It reworks a theme used in de Hooch's earlier works such as Soldiers Playing Cards (1657–1658; private collection) and Card Players in a Bright Interior (1658; Windsor Castle, Royal Collection). He also returned to the theme in the later Card Players at a Table (1670–1674; private collection).

== See also ==
- List of paintings by Pieter de Hooch

== Bibliography ==
- "Joueurs de cartes dans un riche intérieur | Musée du Louvre | Paris". louvre.fr.
- Peter C. Sutton, Pieter de Hooch, Complete edition, Oxford, Phaidon, 1980, p. 93-94.
- Peter C. Sutton, Pieter de Hooch, 1629–1684, London, Yale University Press, 1998–1999, p. 26-28.
