= A Man with Dead Birds, and Other Figures, in a Stable =

Dutch Golden Age painting by Pieter de Hooch

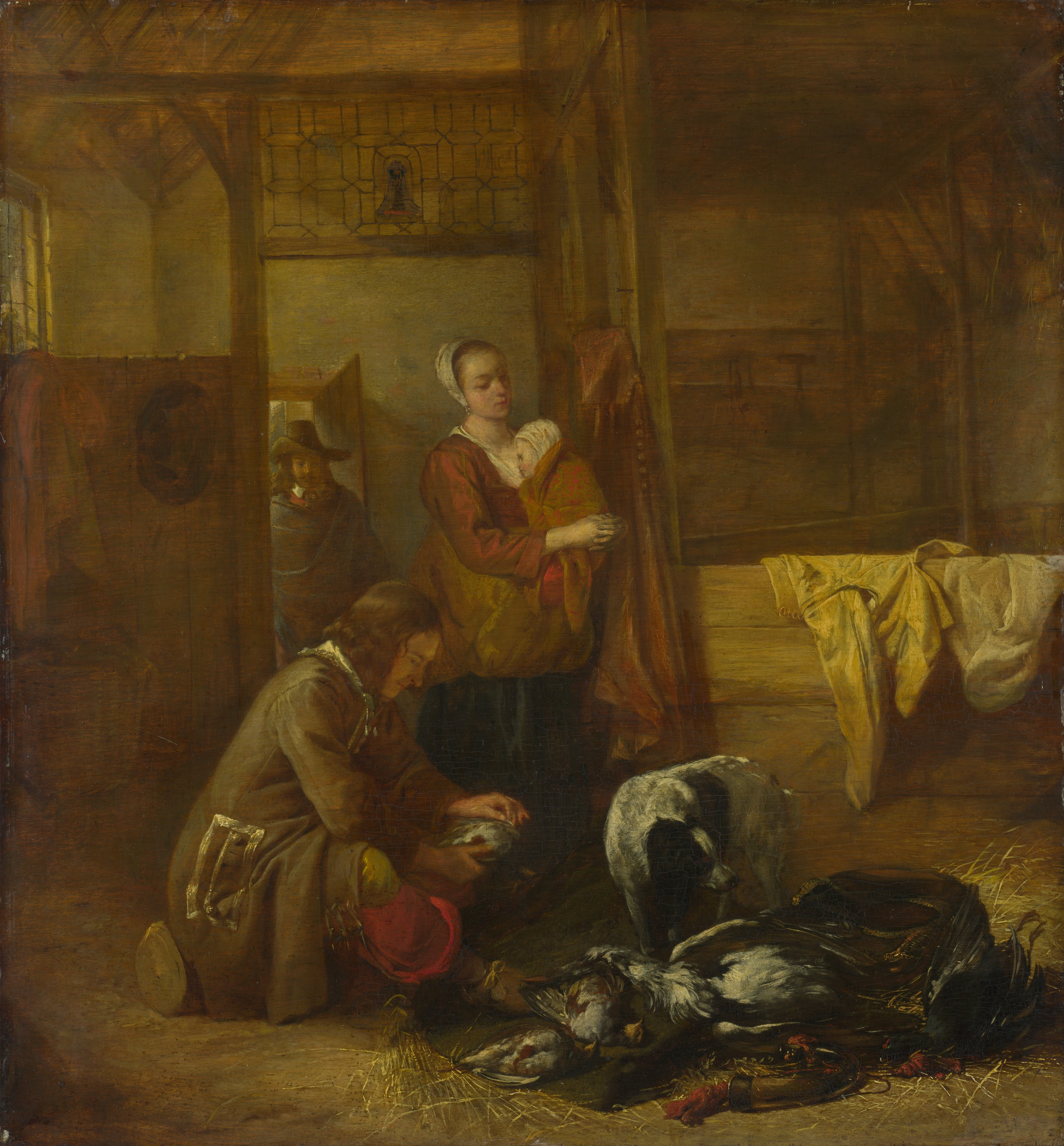
- Artist: Pieter de Hooch
- Year: c. 1655
- Type: genre art
- Medium: Oil on oak
- Dimensions: 53.5 cm × 49.7 cm (21.1 in × 19.6 in)
- Location: National Gallery, London, London
- Accession: NG3881

A Man with Dead Birds, and Other Figures, in a Stable (c. 1655) is an oil-on-oak painting by the Dutch painter Pieter de Hooch. It is an example of Dutch Golden Age painting and is now in the National Gallery, London

== Description ==
Completed in the 1660s, this piece exemplifies de Hooch's mastery of interior scenes with figures, architectural elements, and the distinctive use of light that characterised his mature work.

The painting depicts the interior of a stable or barn. On the right side, clothes draped over a wooden plank catch the light, contrasting with the shadowy area behind it. The entrance features an arrangement of geometric shapes, including a pane of stained glass containing a central motif of a cloaked figure, potentially of religious significance. To the left, indistinct objects hang on another wooden half-wall, behind which a latticework of narrow beams angles upwards, creating a tall ceiling overhead.

In the foreground, a spaniel sniffs at a pile of dead birds on the floor. The focal point appears to be a young woman cradling a baby, whose gaze is directed towards the birds with an inscrutable expression. However, the pile of birds is a later overpainting dating to the 19th century. The original composition depicted a wounded man, possibly a soldier, lying on the floor, with another figure attending to his injuries. The woman's expression may have read differently in that context. The person entering through the doorway in the background remains unexplained in the current state, but may have represented a doctor, servant, or religious figure in the original narrative.

De Hooch employs the device of a figure in an open doorway, a compositional technique he revisited throughout his oeuvre (as in, A Woman and a Maid in a Courtyard), as a means of engaging the viewer's curiosity and providing depth through linear perspective. A series of rectangular forms, both open and closed, further define the spatial construction and demonstrate the artist's skill with perspective.

The palette is subdued, consisting primarily of browns, greys, and ochres, with accents of muted pinks and reds animating elements like the man's hat, the woman's sleeve, and the jacket of the figure in the doorway. The brightest point is a glowing red shape, the baby's shawl, situated nearly in the centre of the composition.

Modern analysis of the provenance and paint analysis leads to the conclusion that the 19th-century painter Ignatius Van Regemorter (1795–1873) was probably the one who did the overpainting, at some time after he or his father purchased it in 1825. The painting was later sold in 1900 for 85 guineas as a work by Jan Baptist Weenix and was donated to the museum in 1929. It was described in later catalogues as "a collaborative work by Weenix and de Hooch", but there has never been any evidence the two painters worked together.

== Wounded man painting ==
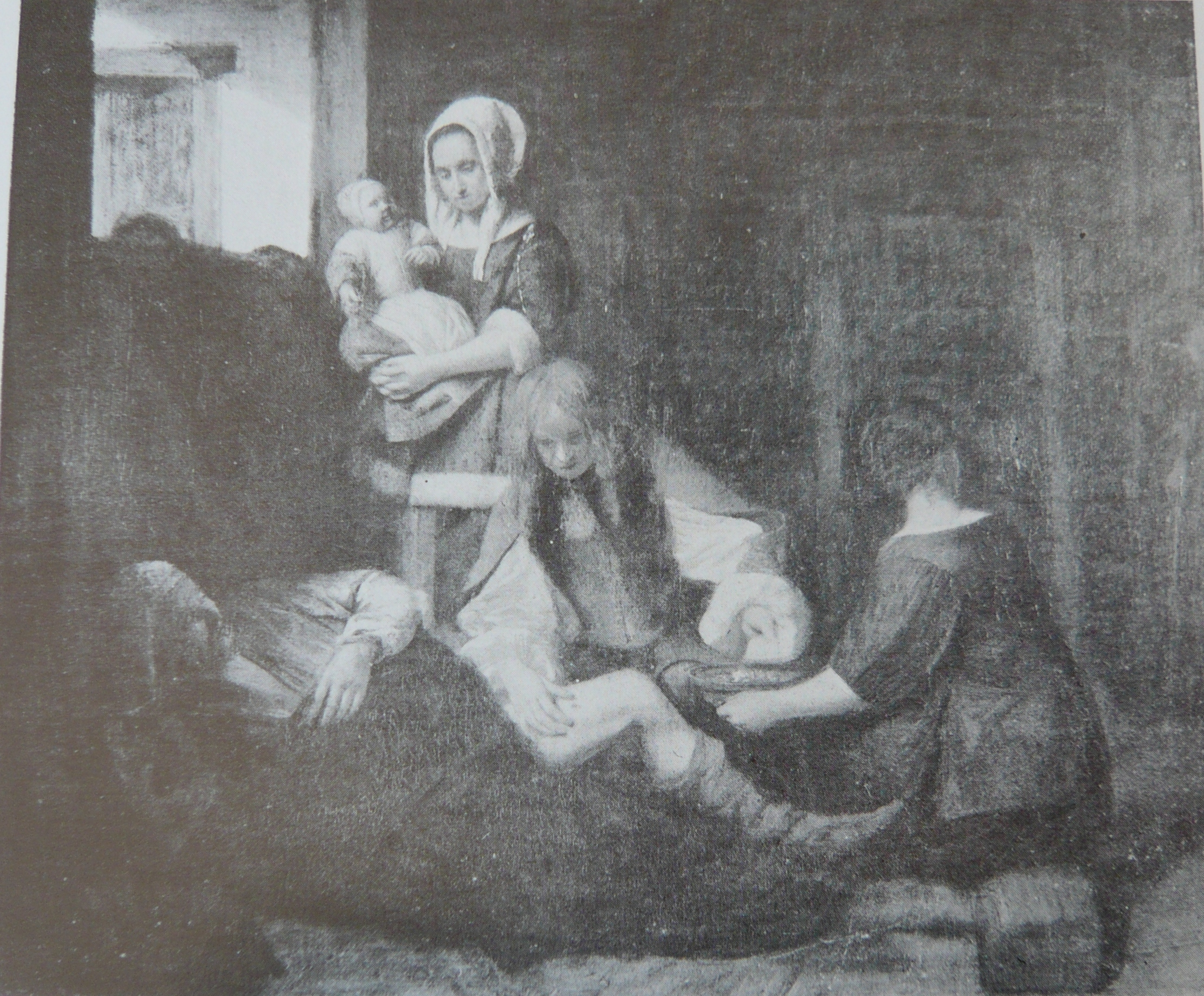
A Wounded Man being Treated in a Stable c. 1667

While paintings depicting scenes from the Dutch struggle against Spain were popular in the Netherlands during the second quarter of the 17th century, they tended to portray the lighter aspects of military life, such as soldiers playing games or drinking in taverns. Representations of the graver realities of war, including battles, starvation, the dead, and the wounded, were less common subjects for artists depicting soldier subjects.

However, the subject of the wounded soldier was not unique in the oeuvre of the Dutch Golden Age painter Pieter de Hooch. Wounded Soldier c.1667 features a comparable scene to his work in the National Gallery collection. Both depict the interior of a stable setting in the foreground, with bits of straw scattered on the floor. A prominent figure in each is a mother with a young child, whose gaze is directed towards a reclining, presumably wounded figure. The standing female figure forms the apex of a triangular grouping positioned parallel to the picture plane in both compositions.

The Wounded Soldier painting is of somewhat smaller scale, executed on canvas rather than the panel support of the National Gallery work. Despite the difference in size and medium, the two scenes bear a remarkable resemblance in their basic elements and arrangement. This suggests the wounded soldier theme carried particular significance for de Hooch as a subject he revisited across multiple works during his career.

== Provenance ==
The painting was first recorded in a sale by O.W.J. Berg in Amsterdam, being sold for 38 florins to Ignatius Van Regemorter, who later painted over the scene. In 1900, the painting was sold in London from the collection of Madame de Falbe to A.H Buttery for 85 guineas. It was in this sale that the painting was erroneously attributed to Jan Baptist Weenix. The last owner of the painting was C. Fleischmann (name later changed to Ashcroft). In 1924, his relatives donated the painting to the National Gallery in London in memory of their parents, on the occasion of the National Gallery Centenary.

== See also ==
- List of paintings by Pieter de Hooch
