= Woman Lacing Her Bodice Beside a Cradle =

Painting by Pieter de Hooch

Woman lacing her bodice beside a cradle
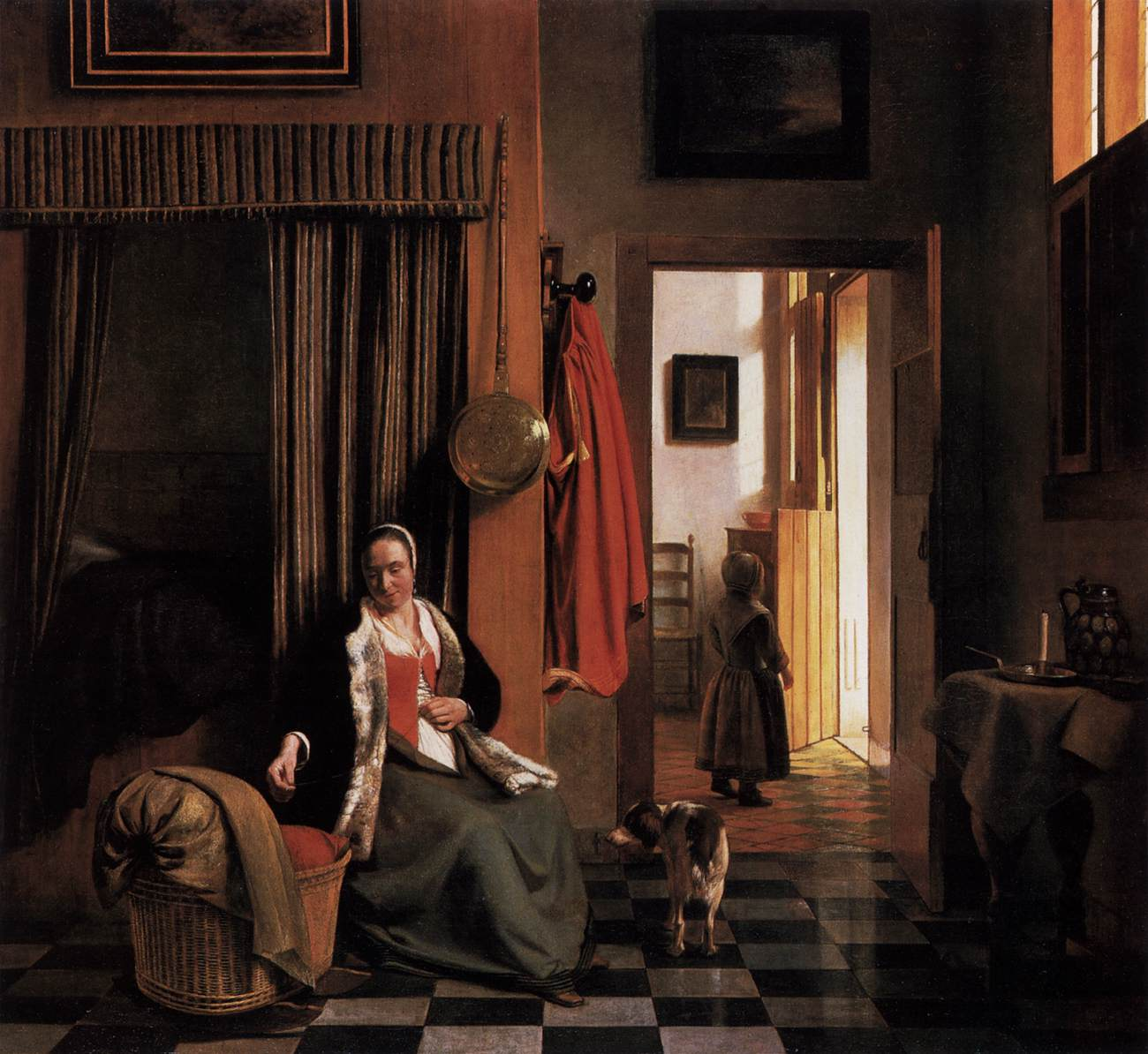
- Artist: Pieter de Hooch
- Year: c. 1660–1663
- Medium: oil on canvas
- Dimensions: 92 cm × 100 cm (36 in × 39 in)
- Location: Gemäldegalerie, Berlin; Berlin

Woman lacing her bodice beside a cradle is an oil-on-canvas painting by the Dutch painter Pieter de Hooch, created c. 1660–1663. It is part of the collection of the Gemäldegalerie, Berlin.

This was the third painting by Hooch documented by the Dutch art historian and museum curator Cornelis Hofstede de Groot in 1910, who wrote:

3. MOTHER BESIDE A CRADLE. Sm. 9, 52, Suppl. 26; deG. 16. Beside a cradle in the left foreground of a room with tiled floor sits a young woman, who has just suckled her baby and is fastening up her bodice, smiling, as she does so, at the child in the cradle who is not visible to the spectator. Behind her, on the left, in a panelled recess, is a four-post bed with a blue and white striped curtain. On the panelling hang a brass warming-pan and a red skirt. Beside the woman is a dog, lazily stretching himself. On the extreme right, under a high window, the lower half of which is closed with shutters, stands a table with a candle-stick and a jug. An open door on the right leads into an ante-room where a young girl is standing before the half-open house-door, through which the sunshine streams in. It is the finest work by the master in Germany.

Canvas, 36 1/2 inches by 40 inches. Sale, M. Martin, Paris, March 22, 1790 (1500 francs). In the Hoofman collection, in Haarlem, 1827 and 1842 (Sm.). Sale. Schneider, Paris, April 6, 1876, No. 13 (135,000 francs, Berlin Museum).

Then in the Kaiser Friedrich Museum, later Bode Museum, of the Berlin State Museums, 1904 catalogue, No. 820b.

== See also ==
- List of paintings by Pieter de Hooch
