= Cardplayers in a Sunlit Room =

Painting by Pieter de Hooch

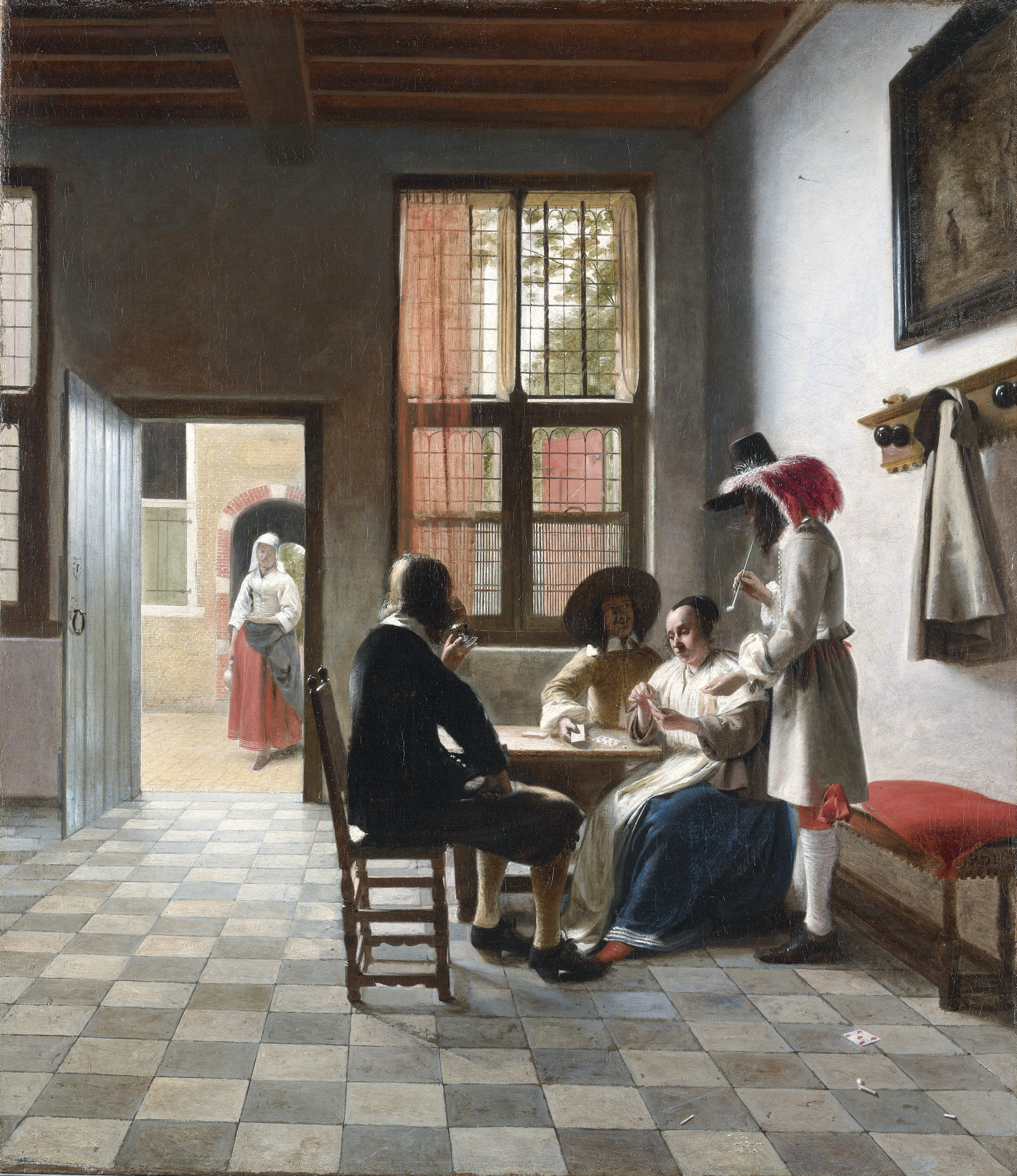
- Artist: Pieter de Hooch
- Year: 1658
- Medium: Oil on canvas
- Dimensions: 77.2 cm × 67.4 cm (30.4 in × 26.5 in)
- Location: King's Gallery; London
- Owner: Royal Collection
- Accession: RCIN 405951

Cardplayers in a Sunlit Room (1658) is an oil-on-canvas painting by the Dutch painter Pieter de Hooch; it is an example of Dutch Golden Age painting and is now in the Royal Collection and on display at the King's Gallery in London.

== Context ==
Painted during the middle of his career, this painting follows the general style of de Hooch's works, mainly domestic scenes featuring multiple subjects engaging in mundanities of the time. These paintings in particular are characterised by the still atmosphere broken up by the entry of a soft, delicate light, usually through an open door or window presenting the outside world, conveying a moral message. These characteristics had much in common with his contemporary Johannes Vermeer, who he was said to have influenced artistically, with the pair of them living in Delft and attending the Delft School together. The evolution evident in de Hooch's body of work likely drew inspiration from fellow artists in Delft, particularly Carel Fabritius, Gerard Houckgeest, and Emanuel de Witte. These local painters, predominantly focused on architectural themes, sought to innovate illusionistic effects through the skillful application of perspective. Fabritius' A View of Delft shows initial explorations in this direction, while Vermeer's A Lady at the Virginals exemplifies the culmination of this stylistic approach of Golden Age painters.

== Painting ==
Cardplayers in a Sunlit Room captures a serene yet engaging scene in a sunlit interior. The painting exemplifies de Hooch's distinctive approach, where figures, though present, assume a secondary role, inviting viewers to immerse themselves in the spatial beauty of the depicted scene. The composition subtly directs attention away from the characters, emphasizing the interplay of light and interior spaces.

In this seemingly casual setting, believed to be an inn, individuals engage in leisure activities such as smoking, playing cards, and enjoying drinks. The figures, rendered in a calm and reflective mood, appear almost as if we've interrupted their game, with two men on the right possibly forming a cheating partnership. The painting skillfully captures a moment in time, with a maid holding a jug of wine crossing a courtyard, suggesting a pause in the activities as they await a refill.

Several contemporaneous works by de Hooch, such as A Girl Drinking with Two Soldiers, A Soldier Paying a Hostess, and The Courtyard of a House in Delft with a Woman and a Child, share a similar tranquil atmosphere and attention to detail. Noteworthy are elements like playing cards, a raised glass, and a broken pipe, intentionally placed to captivate the viewer's attention and enhance the palpable atmosphere of the scene.

De Hooch's mastery of light is evident in the play of sunlight across different surfaces, particularly in the rendering of translucent curtains and glass panes. The subdued color palette against a grey background, blended with white, contributes to the mother-of-pearl tone of the painting, heightening the overall visual impact.

Despite the highly detailed finish, de Hooch employs a surprisingly broad handling of paint, especially in the depiction of figures. The tiled floor, with its squares almost matter-of-factly laid in, reveals under-drawing and compositional changes, such as the absence of a hat on the man drinking to the left. Unlike some Dutch paintings of the era, symbolism appears absent, with the painting on the wall, while prominent, seemingly devoid of hidden meanings. However, the broken pipe and playing cards invite interpretation, adding a layer to possible interpretations.

Architectural parallels can be seen between this piece and other works by Pieter de Hooch; for example, the archway in the background is the primary subject of The Courtyard of a House in Delft and Courtyard with an Arbour.

=== Fingerprint ===
In 2019, conservators discovered a fingerprint impression in the lower right corner of the painting. The print, likely a thumb, was made in wet paint prior to varnishing. Art historian Anita Jansen suggests it is almost certainly the artist's own print. Its presence in the original paint layer implies direct artist involvement, possibly resulting from de Hooch handling the canvas while the paint was still wet.

== Provenance ==
The painting was previously in the Amsterdam collections of Isaac Walraven (sold 1765 for 450 florins) and Nicolaas Doekscheer (sold 1789 for 500 florins). It likely descended through the Hoofman family to Pieter Nicolaaes Quarles van Ufford, who sold it in 1818 for 2,270 florins. After passing through the hands of dealer Jan Hulswit, it was purchased by Christianus Johannes Nieuwenhuys in 1822 for 2,500 florins and subsequently owned by Baron Charles Frédéric Ernest Louis de Mecklenberg; it was then acquired by London dealer John Smith in 1824 for 15,000 francs. On 27 April 1825, Lord Farnborough purchased the work for George IV for £700.

The painting has been part of the Royal Collection at Buckingham Palace since 1841.

== See also ==
- List of paintings by Pieter de Hooch
