= Interior with a Man Reading a Letter and a Woman Sewing =

Painting by Pieter de Hooch

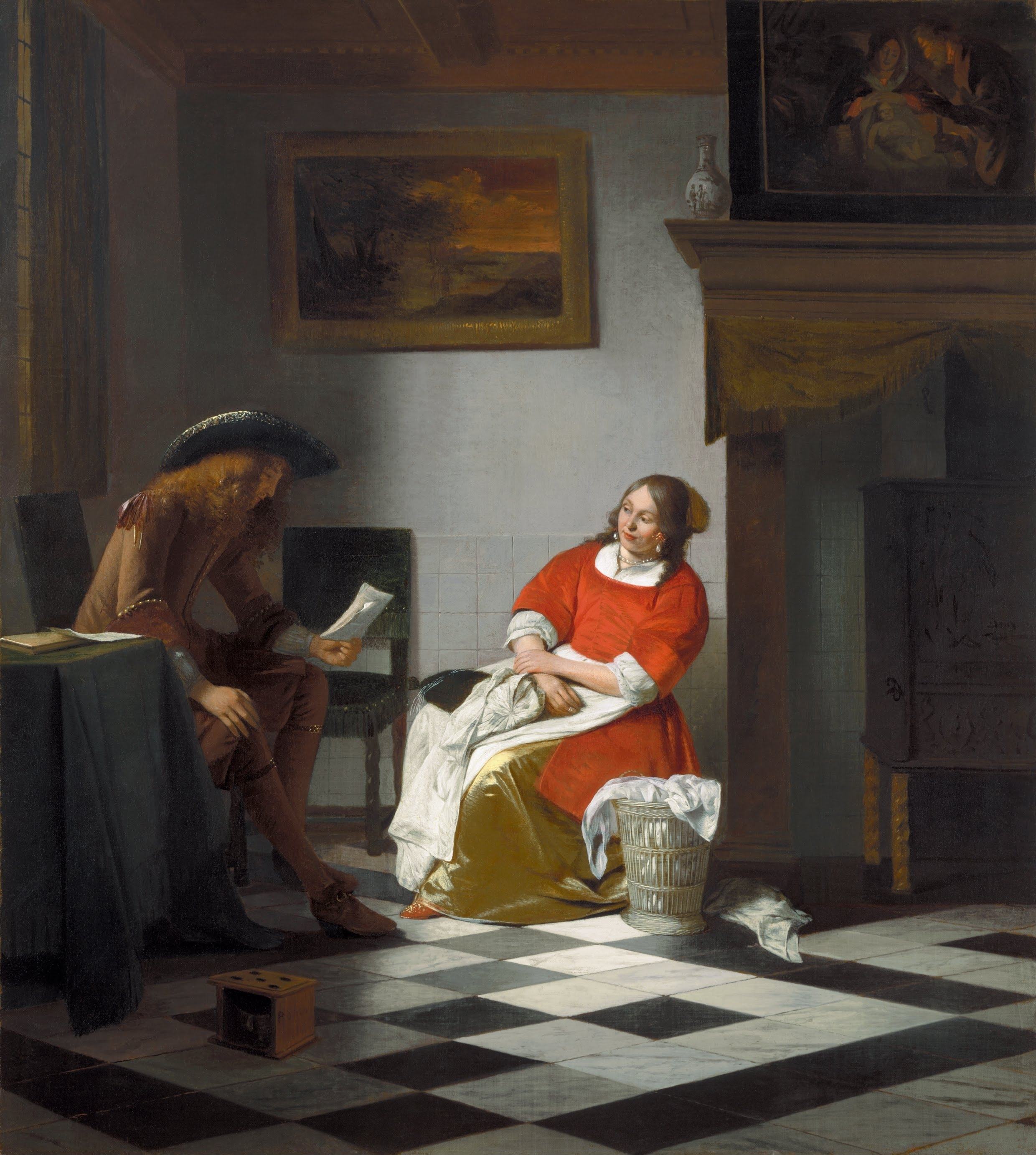
- Artist: Pieter de Hooch
- Year: Circa 1670–1674
- Medium: Oil on canvas
- Dimensions: 77 × 69.9 cm
- Location: Kremer Collection
- Website: https://thekremercollection.com/artists/pieter-de-hooch/

Interior with a Man Reading a Letter and a Woman Sewing is an oil painting on canvas executed c. 1670–1674 by the Dutch artist Pieter de Hooch, now in the private Kremer Collection.

== Context ==
The theme of men and women engaged in reading or writing letters was highly popular among Dutch artists in the latter half of the 17th century. The theme recurs amongst the works of Johannes Vermeer, Gabriël Metsu and, in particular, Gerard ter Borch. This artistic trend was a reflection of the "Great age of letter writing," a period when personal correspondence became increasingly significant. The rise in literacy, improvements in the postal system, and the publication of letter-writing manuals contributed to this cultural phenomenon. For women, in particular, letters offered a means of personal expression, education, and participation in broader social and cultural spheres.

The popularity of the letter-writing theme was driven by artistic trends pioneered by artists like Gerard ter Borch, and was theoretically championed by the art theorist Gerard de Lairesse. He argued that depicting the decorous leisure of the elite, such as letter writing, ennobled the work and resonated with upper-class patrons who saw these idealized scenes as lofty mirrors of their own status.

De Hooch began his career with the painting of scenes called "Koortegardje", a bastardization of the French term, "Corps de garde", meaning guard house. These early works primarily consisted of compositions depicting soldiers and peasants in rustic settings like stables and taverns, in the style of a Merry company. These paintings greatly developed his proficiency in light, colour and perspective.

After de Hooch moved from Leiden to Amsterdam around 1660, he devoted himself frequently to painting interiors, in which he also regularly included letter-reading figures. This thematic choice, along with his rendering of delicate textures, points to the influence of his contemporary, Gerard ter Borch. "Interior with a man reading a letter and a woman sewing" serves as a characteristic example of this mature period, embodying the stylistic and thematic evolution in his work.

== Painting ==
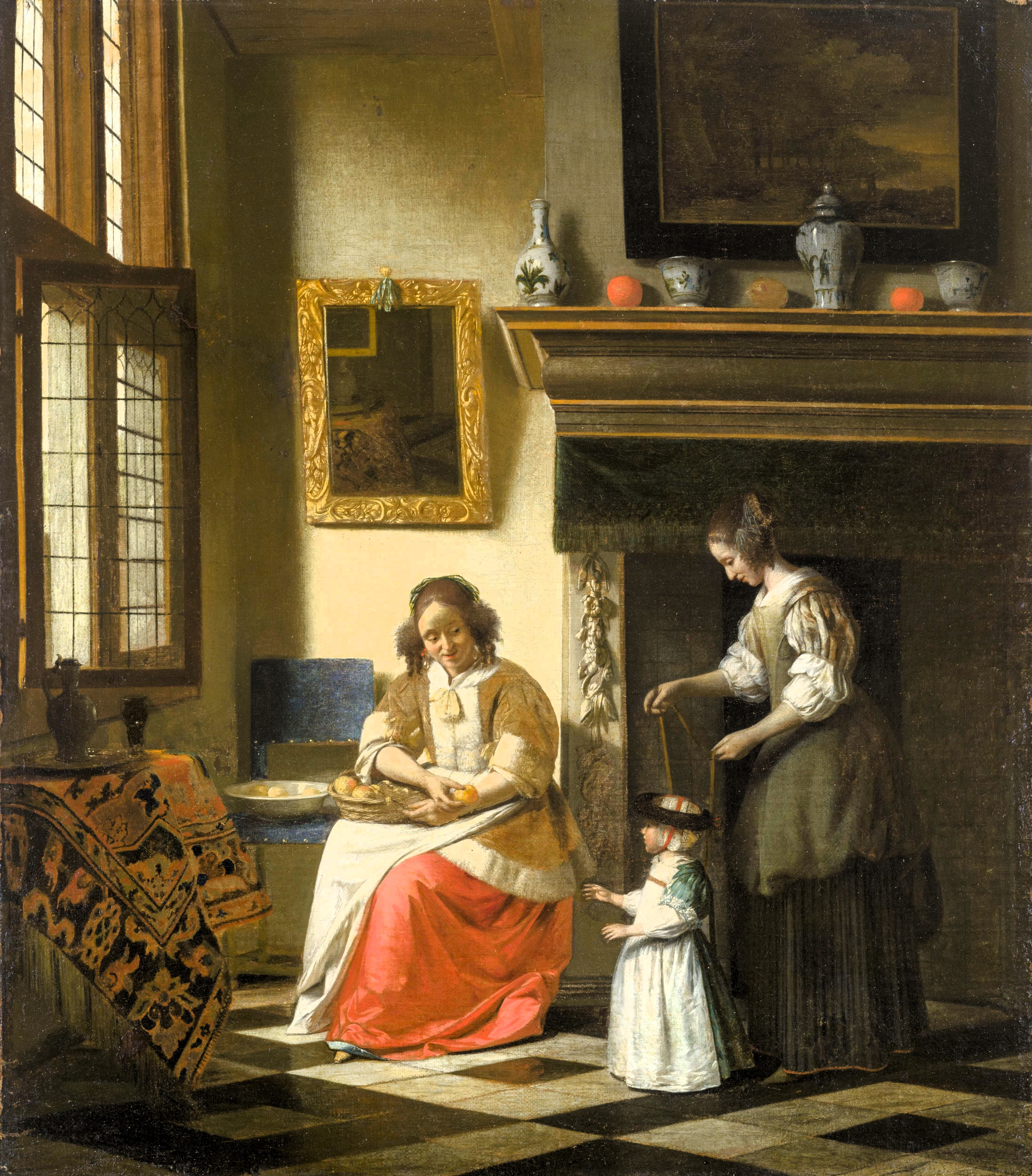
Two women teaching a child with a drop hat to walk, similar composition, same period

'Interior with a Man Reading a Letter and a Woman Sewing' shows pre-eminently De Hooch's fascination of the period for the subtle transitions between light and dark, especially for the contrast between delicate incoming sunlight and shadows. The structure is balanced and soothing, in clearly distinguished planes. In the centre of the composition, a woman is fully illuminated by a brightly entering sunlight, which brilliantly lights up her satin dress and bright red jacket, as well as the wicker basket of linen. Evidently, until shortly before the moment depicted, she was still busy with a sewing job, still on her lap, and stopped for a moment to listen to the entering man who has sat down on a chair to her left. This letter-reading man is emphatically shadowed by De Hooch, optically drawing attention directly to the woman.

The couple sits a bit backwards, almost concealed in a corner, but through the marble tiled floor, de Hooch nevertheless creates a certain space and depth. The woman leans back slightly, as if she wants to listen to and watch the man bending forward a bit better. It is also conceivable that she does not want to lean too close to him, thus creating a kind of juxtaposition that emphasises the interaction between them and gives the work a special tension. What the nature of the letter the man is reading remains unclear.

It is also unclear what the exact relationship is between the two people. For a servant, the woman is clearly wearing clothes that are too expensive. The narrative interpretation of the scene is clearly left to the viewer.

It has been suggested that with this painting, de Hooch – as often in his oeuvre – wanted to pay some kind of homage to the simplicity and intimacy of domestic life, giving the woman a central role, in this work by placing her fully in the light. In this regard, a possible allegorical significance of the painting in the upper right, with Mary, Joseph and the Jesus child, has also been pointed out, referring to inherent tenderness within family life. Interior with a man reading a letter and a woman sewing is widely regarded as one of the best works from De Hooch's later period. It is also often praised for its excellent condition.

== History ==
Around 1800, Interior with a Man Reading a Letter and a Woman Sewing was bought on the London art market by Willem Joseph van Brienen van de Groote Lindt, who hung it in his mansion on the Herengracht in Amsterdam. The work remained in his family for two generations. It is not known what happened to it in the 20th century. In 1997, art collectors George and Ilone Kremer bought it for £675,000 at a Christie's auction for their private art collection. The painting is regularly loaned for exhibitions.

== Letters by contemporaries ==
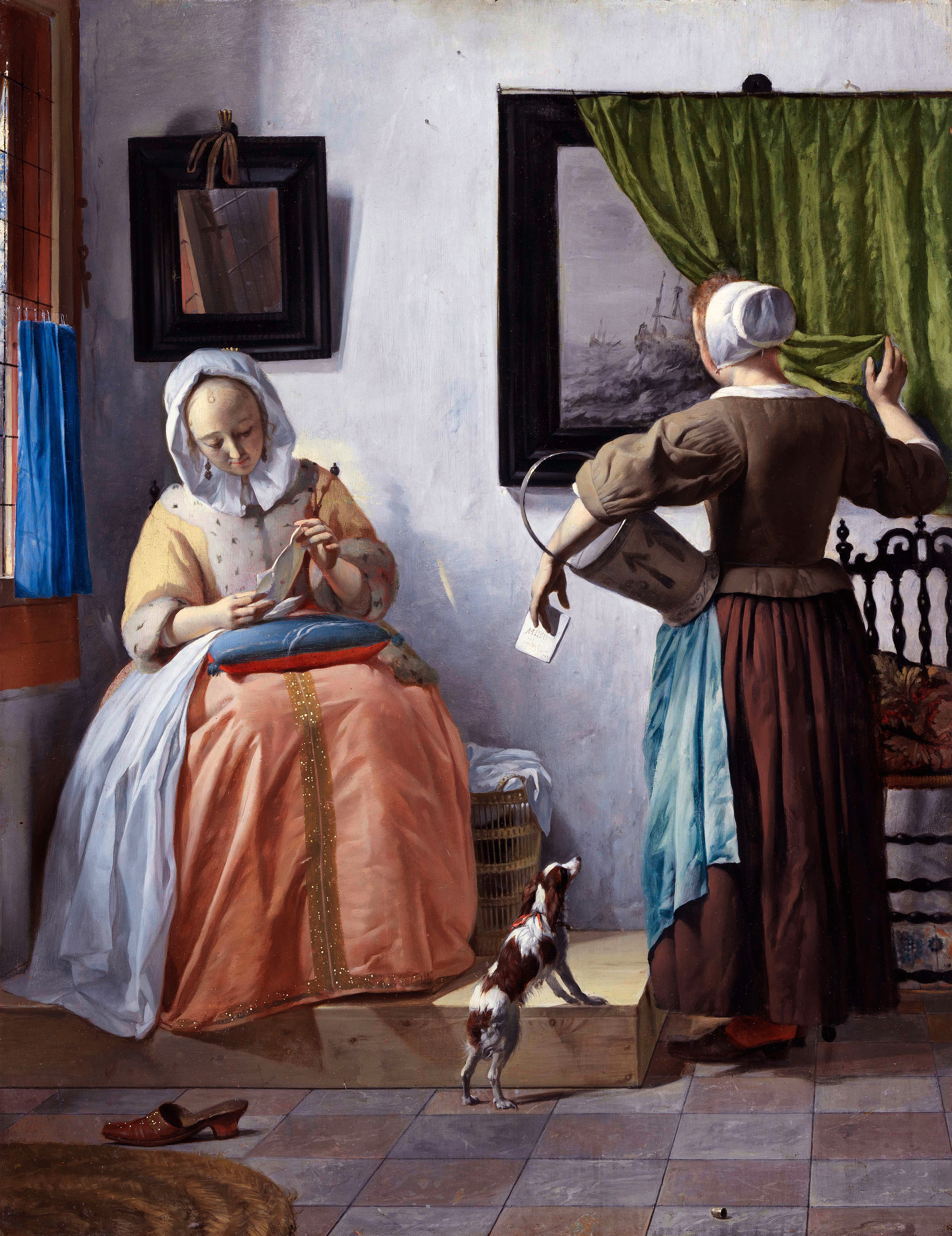
Gabriël Metsu, Woman Reading a Letter

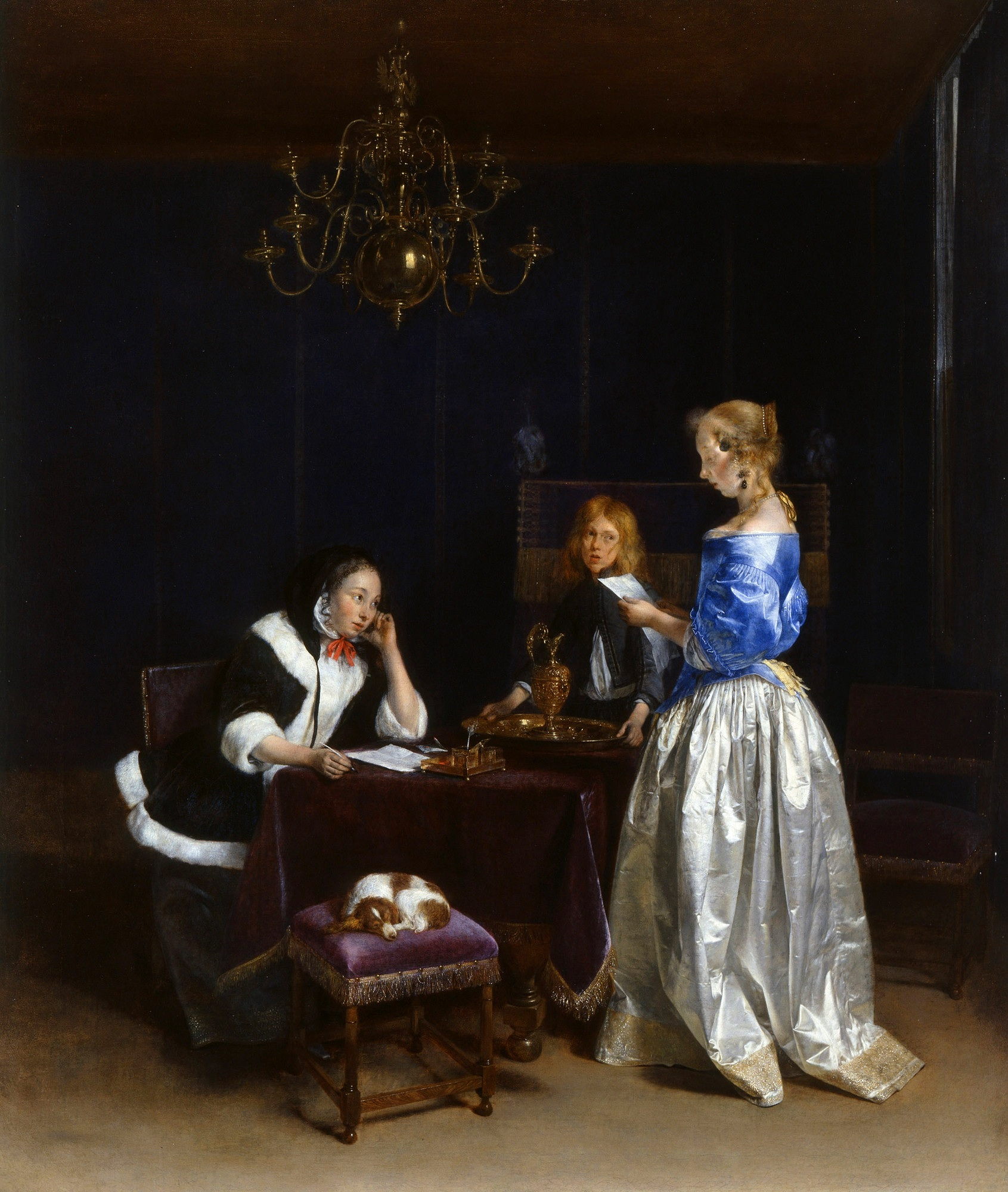
Gerard ter Borch, The Letter

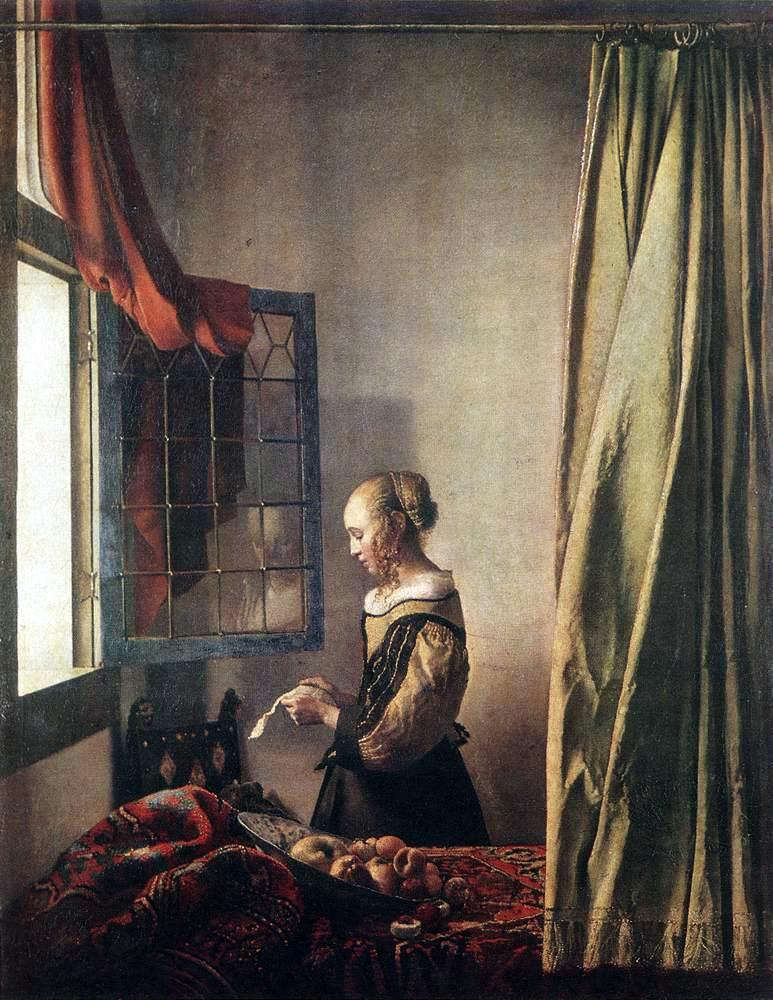
Johannes Vermeer, Girl Reading a Letter at an Open Window

== See also ==
- List of paintings by Pieter de Hooch
