= List of paintings by Pieter de Hooch =

The following is an incomplete list of paintings by Pieter de Hooch, a Dutch Golden Age painter, that are generally accepted as autograph by Peter C. Sutton and other sources. The list is more or less in order of creation, starting from around 1648 when Pieter de Hooch began painting on his own in Delft. Later he moved to Amsterdam and his interiors seem somewhat grander in style. Most of his works are genre scenes involving daily life, but he also made at least one religious allegory.

Image	Title	Year	Size	Inventory nr.	Gallery	Location
	Self-portrait	1648	32.5 × 34 cm	SK-A-181	Rijksmuseum	Amsterdam
	The Merry Drinker	1650	50 × 42 cm	B33	Gemäldegalerie	Berlin
	Two Soldiers and a Serving Woman with a Trumpeter	1650–1655	76 × 66 cm		Kunsthaus Zürich	Zurich
	Soldier Offering a Woman a Glass of Wine	с. 1653	71 × 69 cm	ГЭ-6316	Hermitage Museum	St. Petersburg
	Two soldiers drinking with a serving woman	1650–1655	52 × 46 cm		private collection	unknown
	Liberation of St. Peter from prison	1650–1655	30.5 cm × 37.5 cm		private collection	unknown
	A soldier smoking a pipe	1650	34.7 × 27 cm	499	Philadelphia Museum of Art	Philadelphia
	Woman with basket of beans in the kitchen garden	1651	69.5 × 59 cm		Kunstmuseum Basel	Basel
	Tric-Trac players	1652–1655	45 × 33.5 cm	NGI.322	National Gallery of Ireland	Dublin
	Tavern interior with a seated soldier, seen from behind, with a serving woman, figures playing cards in the background	1652–1655	42.7 × 33.5 cm		private collection	unknown
	Soldiers with a Serving Maid in a Barn	1650s	54.8 × 69.1 cm	498	Philadelphia Museum of Art	Philadelphia
	The Empty Glass	1652	44 × 35 cm	2499 (OK)	Museum Boijmans Van Beuningen	Rotterdam
	Soldiers with a serving woman and a flute player	1650–1655	60 × 73 cm	269	Galleria Borghese	Rome
	Two soldiers with a serving woman and a boy in a tavern	1650–1655	49 × 50 cm		private collection	unknown
	Bringer of Bad News	1655	68 × 56 cm	065005-000	Museu Nacional d'Art de Catalunya	Barcelona
	Soldier with maid and cardplayers in a tavern	1655	58 × 71 cm	WRM 2841	Wallraf-Richartz Museum	Cologne
	The Morning of a Young Man	1655–1657	40 × 53 cm	Ж-2621	Pushkin Museum	Moscow
	A Man with Dead Birds, and Other Figures, in a Stable	1655	53.5 × 49.7 cm	NG3881	National Gallery	London
	Interior with a woman and a child; outside a maid is sweeping the yard	1655–1656	59.7 × 47 cm		private collection	unknown
	Courtyard with a Woman Spinning	1656	69.2 × 54 cm	RCIN 405331	Royal Collection	London
	Woman and child by a window, with a maid sweeping	1655–1658	65 × 80 cm	37	Ranger's House	London
	Interior with mother and child and a maid sweeping	1655–1657	43.2 × 38.3 cm		private collection	unknown
	Two Women and a Child in a Courtyard	1657	68 × 57.5	1949.27	Toledo Museum of Art	Toledo
	Woman Peeling Vegetables in the Back Room of a Dutch House	1657	60 × 49 cm	1372	musée du Louvre	Paris
	A Woman and Child in a Bleaching Ground	1657–1659	73.5 × 63 cm		private collection	unknown
	A Woman and Two Men in an Arbour	1657	43 × 36.5 cm	1976.100.25	Metropolitan Museum of Art	New York City
	Merry company with two men and two women	1657	67.9 × 58.5 cm	29.100.7	Metropolitan Museum of Art	New York City
	Two soldiers playing cards and a girl filling a pipe	1657	50.5 × 45.7 cm		private collection	unknown
	Soldier paying a landlady in an inn	1658	71 × 63,5 cm		Mount Stuart House	Isle of Bute
	Woman Nursing an Infant, with a Child and a Dog	1658–1660	67.9 × 55.6 cm	61-44-37	de Young	San Francisco
	Woman and Child in a Courtyard	1658–1660	73.5 × 66 cm	1942.9.34	National Gallery of Art	Washington D.C.
	The Golf Players	1658	63.5 × 45.7 cm		Polesden Lacey	Polesden Lacey
	A Woman Drinking with Two Men	1658	73.7 cm × 64.6 cm	NG834	National Gallery	London
	Cardplayers in a Sunlit Room	1658	76.2 × 66 cm	RCIN 405951	Royal Collection	London
	A Woman with a Child in a Pantry	1658	65 × 60.5 cm	SK-A-182	Rijksmuseum	Amsterdam
	Woman drinking with two men and a maid in an interior	1658	68.8 cm × 60 cm	RF 1974-29	Louvre	Paris
	Interior with 5 soldiers and armor on the wall	1650–1655	46.7 × 64.2 cm		private collection	unknown
	A Woman with a Baby in Her Lap, and a Small Child	1658	60 × 47 cm		private collection	unknown
	Woman and Child in a Street	1657–1659	76.2 × 62.2 cm		private collection	lost in a fire
	A Dutch Courtyard	1658–1660	68 × 59 cm	1937.1.56	National Gallery of Art	Washington D.C.
	Group portrait of an unknown family or company	1650–1665	112.5 cm × 97 cm	715	Academy of Fine Arts Vienna	Vienna
	The Bedroom	1658	51.8 × 60.6 cm	259	Staatliche Kunsthalle Karlsruhe	Karlsruhe
	The Bedroom	1658–1660	51 × 60 cm	1942.9.33	National Gallery of Art	Washington D.C.
	A Mother's Duty	1658	52.5 × 61 cm	SA 7516	Amsterdam Museum; Rijksmuseum	Amsterdam
	Courtyard with an Arbour	1658	66.5 × 56.5 cm		private collection	unknown
	The Courtyard of a House in Delft	1658	73.5 cm × 60 cm	NG835	National Gallery	London
	A Man Smoking and a Woman Drinking in a Courtyard	1659	78 × 65 cm	835	Mauritshuis	The Hague
	Interior with a Woman weighing Gold Coin	1659–1662	61 × 53 cm	1401B	Gemäldegalerie	Berlin
	Woman with a glass of wine and a child in a garden	1658–1660	62 × 58 cm		private collection	unknown
	Woman and Maid in a Courtyard	1660–1661	73.7 cm × 62.6 cm	NG794	National Gallery	London
	Maid with a Bucket and Broom in a Courtyard	1660	49.4 × 41 cm		Staatliche Kunsthalle Karlsruhe	Karlsruhe
	A man and a serving woman behind a screen, with card players beyond	1660	88 × 81 cm		private collection	unknown
	Lady and her Cook	с. 1660	53 × 42 cm	ГЭ-943	Hermitage Museum	St. Petersburg
	A Woman Preparing Bread and Butter for a Boy	1660–1663	68.6 × 53.3 cm	84.PA.47	J. Paul Getty Museum	Los Angeles
	Woman Lacing Her Bodice Beside a Cradle	1661	92 × 100 cm	820B	Gemäldegalerie	Berlin
	Two men and a young woman in a distinguished interior	1660–1664	60 × 66 cm	GM406	German National Museum	Nuremberg
	Merry company in an interior	1663–1665	64.5 × 74.5 cm	1620-P	National Museum of Ancient Art	Lisbon
	Interior with a Young Couple and a Dog	1662–1665	54.8 × 62.8 cm	14.40.613	Metropolitan Museum of Art	New York City
	Man smoking and a young woman by a hearth	1660–1663	71.5 × 54 cm		private collection	unknown
	Company in a courtyard behind a house	1663	61 × 47 cm	SA 7517	Amsterdam Museum; Rijksmuseum	Amsterdam
	Portrait of a family making music	1663	100 × 119 cm	1951.355	The Cleveland Museum of Art	Cleveland
	Nursing Mother, and Child with Serving Maid	1663–1665	64 × 76 cm	GG 5976	Kunsthistorisches Museum	Vienna
	Card Players in an Opulent Interior	1663–1665	67 × 77 cm	INV 1373	Department of Paintings of the Louvre	Paris
	Going for a Walk in the Amsterdam Town Hall	1663–1665	72 cm × 85 cm	213	Musée des Beaux-Arts de Strasbourg	Strasbourg
	A Woman Peeling Apples	1663	70 × 54 cm	P23	Wallace Collection	London
	Two Women Beside a Linen Chest, with a Child	1663	72 × 77.5 cm	SA 7336	Amsterdam Museum; Rijksmuseum	Amsterdam
	A Boy Bringing Bread	1663	74 × 60 cm	P27	The Wallace Collection	London
	Interior with a woman reading and a child with a hoop	1662–1666	63.3 × 80.4 cm	LEAMG : A388.1953	Royal Pump Rooms	Leamington Spa
	The Council Chamber in Amsterdam Town Hall	1663–1665	112.5 × 99 cm	196 (1960.3)	Thyssen-Bornemisza Museum	Madrid
	Musical Party in a Hall	1664–1666	81 × 68.3 cm	1031	Museum der bildenden Künste	Leipzig
	Woman Reading a Letter	1664	55 × 55 cm	5933	Museum of Fine Arts	Budapest
	Leisure Time in an Elegant Setting	c. 1663–65	enlarged by 2 cm on all sides	1975.1.144	Metropolitan Museum of Art	New York City
	Game of Skittles	1663–1666	69.8 cm × 62.2 cm	2564	Waddesdon Manor	Waddesdon
	The intruder, Lady at her toilet, surprised by her lover	c. 1665	52 × 62 cm		Apsley House	London
	Mother with a Child and a Chambermaid	1665–1668	36.5 × 42 cm	SA 7518	Amsterdam Museum	Amsterdam
	Woman busy sewing in an interior	1662–1668	50 × 38.5 cm	PAM 893	Lower Saxony State Museum	Hannover
	Man with a glass and a jug and a woman lacing her bodice	1665	53.5 × 64 cm		private collection	unknown
	Interior with a Mother close to a Cradle	1665	54 × 65 cm	NM 473	Nationalmuseum	Stockholm
	A Woman Placing a Child in a Cradle	1663–1667	45 × 37 cm		private collection	unknown
	Merry Company in a Hall	1664–1666	72 × 67 cm	KMSsp615	Statens Museum for Kunst	Copenhagen
	Game of Skittles in a Garden	1663–1666	66,6 × 73 cm		Saint Louis Art Museum private collection	unknown
	Game of Skittles (copy)	1663–1666	74 × 66.3 cm	1950.19	Cincinnati Art Museum	Cincinnati
	Musical Company on a Terrace with a View of the Amsterdam Town Hall	1667	67.7 × 82 cm		private collection	unknown
	The Maidservant	1667	61.5 × 52 cm	32.100.15	Metropolitan Museum of Art	New York City
	A Wounded Man being Treated in a Stable	1667	41 × 49 cm		private collection	unknown
	A Woman with a Cittern and a Singing Couple at a Table	1667–1670	70 × 58 cm	1931.395	Taft Museum of Art	Cincinnati
	Portrait of a family on a terrace	1667	66.7 × 76.2 cm		private collection	unknown
	A Musical party	1667	52.1 × 58.7 cm	RCIN 403028	Royal Collection	Royal Collection
	Teaching a Child to Walk	1668–1672	67.5 × 59 cm	1558	Museum der bildenden Künste	Leipzig
	Interior with a gentleman and two ladies conversing	1668–1670	70 × 61.8 cm	1979.465	Manchester Art Gallery	Manchester
	Mother and Child with a Boy descending a Stair	1668	65 × 55 cm		private collection	unknown
	Interior looking out on water	1668	56.5 × 47.6 cm	33/6	Michaelis Collection	Cape Town
	Interior with a Woman sewing and a Child	1662–1668	55 × 45 cm	195 (1958.7)	Thyssen-Bornemisza Museum	Madrid
	Woman reading a letter and a man at a window	1669	57 × 49 cm	NM 471	Nationalmuseum	Stockholm
	A Woman Receiving a Man in the Doorway	1669	72.4 × 63.5 cm		private collection	unknown
	Man with a glass and a woman with a jug in an interior	1669	51 × 47 cm		private collection	unknown
	Music making company with a monkey on a terrace	1669	71 × 85.5 cm		private collection	England
	Young woman feeding a parrot, with a man and a serving woman	1669–1671	52 × 44.5 cm		private collection	unknown
	Young woman in an interior, receiving a letter	1668–1670	57 × 53 cm	184	Kunsthalle Hamburg	Hamburg
	Card Players at a Table	1670–1674	107.3 × 93.3 cm		private collection	unknown
	Interior of a Kitchen with a Woman, a Child and a Maid	1668–1672	70 × 63.5 cm		private collection	unknown
	A woman and a maid in an interior	1670	83 × 72 cm	2500 (OK)	Museum Boijmans Van Beuningen	Rotterdam
	Couple playing cards and a serving woman	1665–1675	68 × 58.5 cm	1975.1.143	Metropolitan Museum of Art	New York City
	Merry company with trumpeter in a distinguished interior	1670	99 × 113 cm	7018	Royal Museums of Fine Arts of Belgium	Brussels
	Man playing a lute and woman singing in an interior	1670	73.5 × 62.2 cm		private collection	unknown
	A Sick Child	1670–1680	52 × 61 cm	Ж-2030	Pushkin Museum	Moscow
	Interior with a Child Feeding a Parrot	1668–1672	79.5 × 66 cm		private collection	unknown
	An Elegant Company Making Music in a Vestibule, with a View of a City	1665–1684	56.5 × 69.4 cm		private collection	unknown
	Officer paying a woman in a stable	c. 1670	94.5 × 111.1 cm	58.144	Metropolitan Museum of Art	New York City
	A Woman with a Duck and a Woman with a Cabbage	1677–1684	63 × 75 cm		private collection	unknown
	Woman giving Money to a Servant-Girl	1668–1672	73 × 66 cm		Los Angeles County Museum of Art private collection	unknown
	Family Jacott-Hoppesack	1670	97 × 114.5 cm	SA 41337	Amsterdam Museum	Amsterdam
	Young woman with a letter and a messenger in an interior	1670	68 × 59 cm	SA 7515	Amsterdam Museum; Rijksmuseum	Amsterdam
	The Fireside	1670–1675	64 × 77 cm	52.9.45	North Carolina Museum of Art	Raleigh, NC
	A Woman and Child with a Serving Woman with Asparagus	1670–1674	71 × 82 cm		private collection	unknown
	Interior with a woman knitting and a maid with a girl	1673	72.4 × 62.7 cm		City of London Corporation	London
	Interior with two women, two children and a parrot	1673	76 × 67 cm		private collection	unknown
	Two women and a child, 'A Mother's Care'	1673	75 × 61 cm	Ж-1679	Pushkin Museum	Moscow
	A Merry Company with a Trumpeter	1673–1675	85 × 92 cm		private collection	unknown
	Musical company with a dog in an interior	1672–1676	90 × 108 cm		private collection	London
	Interior with two embracing couples	1673–1675	63.5 × 80 cm		private collection	unknown
	A Musical Conversation	1674	98 × 115 cm	3798.1	Honolulu Museum of Art	Honolulu
	Merry Company with a mandolin and a dog	1673–1675	57 × 65.5 cm		Fondation Bemberg	unknown
	Woman nursing by a cradle with a dog at her feet	1674–1676	79.7 × 59.7 cm	89.39	Detroit Institute of Arts	Detroit
	Standing woman with a woman playing the cello	1675	67 × 52 cm		private collection	unknown
	The Asparagus Vendor	1675–1680	76.2 × 104 cm	82.46	Minneapolis Institute of Arts	Minneapolis
	Interior with Two Gentleman and a Woman Beside a Fire	1675–1680	43.7 × 52.7 cm		private collection	unknown
	Couple with Parrot	1675	73 × 62 cm	WRM 3218	Wallraf-Richartz Museum	Cologne
	Party	1675	81.8 × 98.9 cm	W1912-1-7	Philadelphia Museum of Art	Philadelphia
	A mother with two children and a maid with a pail by a fireplace	1675–1680	83.8 × 81.6 cm		private collection	unknown
	A Housewife Instructing her Maid	1674–1676	91.5 × 83 cm	KMSsp614	Statens Museum for Kunst	Copenhagen
	A Lady and a Child with a Serving Maid		86.2 × 79.7 cm	501	Philadelphia Museum of Art	
	Musical company in an interior	c. 1675	104 × 135 cm		Apsley House	London
	Musical company in a distinguished interior	1675	92.7 × 109.8 cm	67.21	Indianapolis Museum of Art	Indianapolis
	Interior with a Man Reading a Letter and a Woman Sewing	1674–1676	69.9 × 77 cm		George Kremer	unknown
	Merry Company with five figures	1674–1677	92 × 105.5 cm	KMSsp614	Statens Museum for Kunst	Copenhagen
	The Empty Jug	1675–1680	54.5 × 64.7 cm	872130	Saltram House	Plympton
	Woman plucking a duck	1675	54 × 64.5 cm	MNG/SD/360/M	National Museum, Gdańsk	Gdansk
	Woman with a Child and a Maid in an Interior	1675	56.2 × 65.8 cm	1925.117	Worcester Art Museum	Worcester, MA
	Merry company in a distinguished interior	1675–1677	73 × 62 cm	Corcoran 26.103	National Gallery of Art	Washington D.C.
	A Man with a Book and Two Women	1676	63.5 × 75 cm	B102	Gemäldegalerie	Berlin
	A Woman Paying a Girl and a Woman Sweeping	1675–1680	59 × 66 cm		private collection	unknown
	Elegant company with a woman at the virginal	1675–1680	92.5 × 115 cm		private collection	unknown
	Tavern Scene with a Smoker	1675–1680	51 × 64 cm	NM 472	Nationalmuseum	Stockholm
	A Musical Party in a Courtyard	1677	83.5 × 68.5 cm	NG3047	National Gallery	London
	A Woman Holding a Wineglass in a Doorway	1675–1680	40 × 31.6 cm		private collection	unknown
	A Doctor and a Sick Woman	1675–1680	65 × 56 cm		private collection	unknown
	A woman with a baby on her lap and a maid seen from the back	1675–1680	51.8 × 60.7 cm		private collection	unknown
	A Woman Playing a Lute with other Figures	1677	67 × 57 cm		private collection	unknown
	A Musical Party with Three Figures and Serving Woman	1677–1680	64.5 × 73.6 cm		private collection	unknown
	A Woman with a Lute and a Man with a Violin	1677–1684	66 × 59 cm		private collection	unknown
	Outside the Tavern	1677–1680	84.5 × 69.5 cm	KMS1641	Statens Museum for Kunst	Copenhagen
	A Woman Sewing with a Serving Girl and a Child	1680	67.5 × 58 cm		private collection	unknown
	A Couple Making Music at a Table, with a Serving Girl	1680	65 × 53 cm	815	Hermitage Museum	St. Petersburg
	Interior with two women talking, a man and a dog	1680–1684	74 cm × 84 cm	347	musée Granet	Aix-en-Provence
	Elegant couple playing music on a terrace, with a maidservant pouring wine	1680	51.2 × 62.2 cm		private collection	unknown
	A Woman with a Serving Girl	1680	65 × 55 cm	P304	Palais des Beaux-Arts de Lille	Lille
	Company with a black pageboy and a woman feeding a parrot	1680–1684	67 × 56 cm		private collection	unknown
	A Musical Trio in an interior	1680	58.4 × 45.4 cm		private collection	unknown
	A Woman Seated at a Window and a Child in a Doorway	1680	54.1 × 67.2 cm		private collection	unknown
	Interior of a Dutch house with a woman kneeling by a fire conversing with a woman standing	1680	57.5 × 69.8 cm	03.607	Museum of Fine Arts	Boston
	Woman playing the virginal with a man and two dancing dogs	1680–1684	50 × 42.5 cm		private collection	unknown
	Company in an interior eating oysters	1681	60.3 × 52 cm	(CTB.1995.2)	Thyssen-Bornemisza Museum	Madrid
	A Woman kneeling by a Fire with a Musical Company	1680–1684	68 × 82.5 cm		private collection	unknown
	A Musical Company of Four Figures with a Small Boy Dancing	1680–1684	65 × 75 cm		Berkshire Museum	Pittsfield, MA
	Two Women and a Man in Bed	1680–1684	70 × 82 cm		private collection	unknown
	A Musical Company of Four Figures	1684	72 × 84 cm		private collection	unknown
	A Woman kneeling by a Fire with Figures at a Table	1680–1684	67.3 × 83.8 cm		private collection	unknown
	A Woman Taking Butter from a Plate Held by a Little Girl	1680–1684	93 × 82 cm		private collection	unknown
	A Lady and a Gentleman making Music with dancing Dogs	1680–1684	62.2 × 53.3 cm		private collection	unknown
	Man with a letter and a woman feeding a bird	1680–1684	57.5 × 50.8 cm		private collection	unknown
	A Woman Standing before a Man Seated at a Table	1683	43 × 38 cm		private collection	unknown
	Portrait of an unknown man and woman	1684	109.3 × 127.5 cm		private collection	unknown
	A Musical Company of Three Figures	1684	53.3 × 62.8 cm		private collection	unknown

== Sources ==
- A Catalogue Raisonné of the Works of the Most Eminent Dutch Painters of the Seventeenth century Based on the work of John Smith, Volume I (Jan Steen, Gabriel Metsu, Gerard Dou, Pieter de Hooch, Carel Fabritius, Johannes Vermeer of Delft), by Cornelis Hofstede de Groot, with the assistance of Wilhelm Reinhold Valentiner, translated by Edward G. Hawke, Macmillan & Co., London, 1908
- Pieter de Hooch:Complete Edition, by Peter C. Sutton, Phaidon Press, Oxford, 1980, ISBN 0714818283
- Pieter de Hooch in the RKD
