= Gustav Friedrich Waagen =

German art historian (1794–1868)

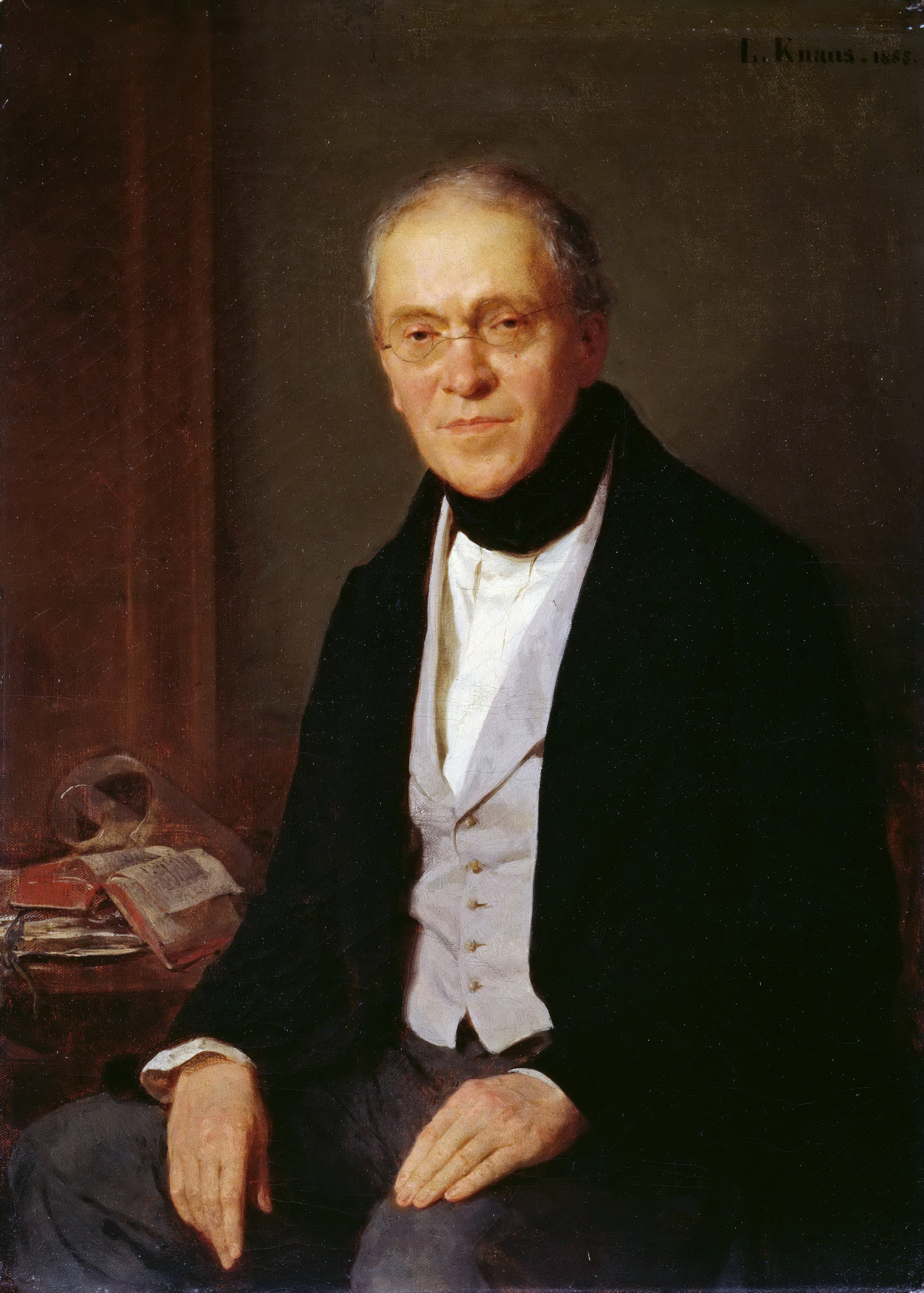
"Portrait of Gustav Friedrich Waagen"; Ludwig Knaus (1855)

Gustav Friedrich Waagen (11 February 1794 – 15 July 1868) was a German art historian. His opinions were greatly respected in England, where he was invited to give evidence before the royal commission inquiring into the condition and future of the National Gallery, for which he was a leading candidate to become director. He died on a visit to Copenhagen in 1868.

== Biography ==
Waagen was born in Hamburg, the son of a painter and a nephew and lover of the poet Ludwig Tieck. Having passed through the college of Hirschberg, Silesia (modern Jelenia Góra), he volunteered for service in the Napoleonic campaign of 1813–14, and on his return attended the lectures at Breslau University. He devoted himself to the study of art, which he pursued in the great European galleries, first in Germany, then in the Netherlands and Italy.

A pamphlet on the brothers van Eyck led in 1832 to his appointment to the directorship of the newly founded Berlin Museum (now vastly expanded as the Berlin State Museums), although his main interest was the paintings in what is now the Gemäldegalerie, Berlin. The result of a journey to London and Paris was an important publication in three volumes, Kunstwerke und Künstler in England und Paris (Berlin, 1837–39), which became the basis for his more important The Treasures of Art in Great Britain, translated by Elizabeth Eastlake, (4 vols, London, 1854 and 1857). This remains a significant source for the provenance of paintings then in English collections. Although Waagen has been criticised for his "amateurish and erratic expertise" by modern standards, his work was regarded as highly authoritative for the following half-century.

In 1844, he was appointed professor of art history at Berlin University, and in 1861 he was called to Saint Petersburg as adviser in the arranging and naming of the pictures in the imperial collection. On his return, he published a book on the Hermitage collection (Munich, 1864). Among his other publications are some essays on Peter Paul Rubens, Andrea Mantegna and Luca Signorelli; Kunstwerke und Künstler in Deutschland; and Die vornehmsten Kunstdenkmäler in Wien.

In 1849 Waagen became a corresponding member, living abroad, of the Royal Institute of the Netherlands. In 1861, he was elected an honorary associate of the Imperial Academy of Arts in St Petersburg.
