= Hofstede de Groot =

Hofstede de Groot is a Dutch surname. Notable people with this surname include:

- Cornelis Hofstede de Groot (1863–1930), Dutch art cataloguer
- Petrus Hofstede de Groot (1802–1886), Dutch theologian
