= Bedroom (disambiguation) =

A bedroom is a residential room used for sleeping.

Bedroom(s) or The Bedroom may also refer to:

== Film and television ==
- Bedrooms (film), a 2010 American film by Youssef Delara
- Bedroom (film), a 2012 Bengali film
- Bedroom TV, a defunct British music channel

== Paintings ==
- The Bedroom (Karlsruhe), a 1658–1660 oil by Pieter de Hooch
- The Bedroom (Widener Collection), a 1658–1660 oil by Pieter de Hooch
- The Bedroom (Van Gogh) or Bedroom in Arles, three similar 1888–1889 paintings by Vincent van Gogh

== Music ==
- "Bedroom", by Ball Park Music from Ball Park Music, 2020
- "Bedroom", by John Cale from Process, 2005
- "Bedroom", by JJ Lin featuring Anne-Marie, 2021
- "Bedroom", by Mabel, 2017
- "Bedroom", by Sarge from Charcoal, 1996
- Bedroom (album), the 2020 debut album by British band Bdrmm
