= Reputation (disambiguation) =

Reputation is generalized or held view of a person or a group

Reputation may also refer to:

== Film and television ==
- Reputation (1917 film), a silent film produced by Frank Powell
- Reputation (1921 film), a silent film produced by Irving Thalberg
- Reputation (2024 film), a low budget British crime drama directed by Martin Law
- Reputation (TV series), an upcoming British legal drama television series.
- "Reputation" (Lewis), a 2006 television episode

== Music ==
- Reputation (album), a 2017 album by Taylor Swift
  - Reputation Stadium Tour, a concert tour to promote that album
- "Reputation", a song by Post Malone from Twelve Carat Toothache
- Reputation (Dusty Springfield album), 1990
- The Reputation, a defunct indie rock band from Chicago, Illinois
  - The Reputation (album), a 2002 album by The Reputation

== See also ==
- Reputation management is the practice of understanding or influencing an individual or business' reputation
- Bad Reputation (disambiguation)
