= Bob Nanna/Elizabeth Elmore EP =

EP by Bob Nanna and Elizabeth Elmore
- Released: 2001
- Genre: indie rock
- Label: Troubleman Unlimited
- Producer: Bob Nanna, Elizabeth Elmore

Elizabeth Elmore chronology
Bob Nanna/Elizabeth Elmore EP (2001)

Bob Nanna/Elizabeth Elmore EP is a split EP by Bob Nanna of Braid and The City on Film and Elizabeth Elmore of The Reputation and Sarge. Released on Nanna's Troubleman Unlimited label in 2001, it features a single song from each performer. This release in particular was Elmore's only output in between her work with Sarge and The Reputation.

== Track listing ==
1. Forgiveness - Robert Nanna
2. You Blink - Elizabeth Elmore
