= Arapi Family House =

Cultural heritage monument of Kosovo

- Shtëpia e familjes Arapi (Albanian)
- Location: Prizren, Kosovo

History
- Built: 19th century

The Arapi Family House is a cultural heritage monument in Prizren, Kosovo.

== History ==
The Arapi family home is in Prizren's historic city center, facing south in the neighborhood of Saraçëve. The house was built in the late 19th century and has been continually inhabited since. The foundation and the ground floor walls (80 centimetres (31 in) thick and 1 metre (3.3 ft) to 1.5 metres (4.9 ft) high) are built from river stone with lime mortar, while the tiles are otherwise hatched together horizontally. The foundation walls are lined with a material known as bondruk and made from clay-mortared adobe; retaining walls are up to 65 centimetres (26 in) thick and partition walls up to 20 centimetres (7.9 in). The mezzanine, windows, doors, and roof are wooden, the latter covered in two layers of tile. The rectangular, two-story building opens onto the street by a large wooden door behind an open porch, above which lies a closed alcove with five front windows. Furniture includes elaborately decorated ceilings, molded wooden cupboards, stairs, a chimney and a bathroom, in addition to ample fire utensils. The ceilings are finished with blue stucco and include an octagonal rose decorated with floral ornaments. The yard has a landscaped garden and dining patio.
