= Distant =

Distant may refer to:

- Distant (album), an album by Sarge, or the title track
- Distant (2002 film), the North American title of a 2002 Turkish film released as Uzak
- Distant (2024 film), a 2024 American film directed by Will Speck and Josh Gordon
- Distant, a deathcore band from The Netherlands
- "Distant", a 2018 song by Jaden Smith from The Sunset Tapes: A Cool Tape Story
- William Lucas Distant (1845–1922), an English entomologist
- Distant signal in railway signalling
