= Charcoal (disambiguation) =

Charcoal is a blackish residue of impure carbon obtained by heating animal and vegetable substances.

Charcoal may also refer to:

- Charcoal (album), the debut album by indie rock band Sarge
- Charcoal (art), a dry art medium made of finely grounded organic materials held together by a binder
- Charcoal (color), a colour that has the hue of charcoal
- Charcoal (comics), a Marvel Comics character and member of the Thunderbolts
- Charcoal (typeface), a sans-serif typeface designed by David Berlow of Font Bureau
- Charcoal (film), a 2022 drama

== See also ==
- Charcoal filter
- Carbonari, or "charcoal burners"
