= To Force a Fate =

Studio album by The Reputation
- Released: 2004
- Genre: Indie rock
- Length: 39:16
- Label: Lookout! Records

The Reputation chronology
| The Reputation (2002) | To Force a Fate (2004) |

Professional ratings
Review scores
| Source | Rating |
|---|---|
| AllMusic | 4/5 stars |
| Robert Christgau | A− |

To Force a Fate is the second album by indie rock band The Reputation, their first for Lookout! Records. It was released in the spring of 2004.

"March" was co-written by Elizabeth Elmore and John Davis of Q and Not U for an unrealized collaborative project called Cosmopolitan.

The album is unique to other Elmore projects in that the original songs were not written and sung by her alone. "Follow-Through Time" was co-written by then-Reputation bass player Joel Root, and "The Lasting Effects" features vocals by guitarist Sean Hulet.

== Track listing ==
1. "Let This Rest" – 4:15
2. "Bottle Rocket Battles" – 2:59
3. "Follow-Through Time" – 3:57
4. "Face It" – 3:09
5. "The Lasting Effects" – 3:48
6. "March" – 2:53
7. "Cartography" – 4:45
8. "Some Senseless Day" – 3:39
9. "The Ugliness Kicking Around" – 5:44
10. "Bone-Tired" – 4:07
