= The Reputation (album) =

Studio album by The Reputation
- Released: 2002
- Recorded: 2001
- Genre: Indie rock
- Length: 45:21
- Label: Initial Records
- Producer: Matt Ellison, Elizabeth Elmore, Jay Bennett

The Reputation chronology
The Reputation (2002)	To Force a Fate (2004)

Professional ratings
Review scores
Source	Rating
AllMusic	4/5 stars
Los Angeles Times	3.5/4 stars
The Stranger	3/4 stars
The Village Voice	A−

The Reputation is the debut album by indie rock band The Reputation. It was released in 2002 on Initial Records.

Written almost entirely by lead singer Elizabeth Elmore, the album was well-received critically. The Los Angeles Times gave the album 3.5 out of 4 stars, saying that "[Elmore's] streaming anecdotes give the listener the feeling of walking right into the middle of life-altering events. The College Music Journal's Amy Wan called the album "showcase for Elmore's powerfully biting lyrics and her passionate voice, dancing deftly between little-girl sweet and outright roar," and Robert Christgau of the Village Voice gave the album an A−.

The album featured regular members Elmore, Sean Hulet (on guitar), and Joel Root (bass). Chad Romanowski, who played in Elmore's previous band Sarge, played drums for most of the album. The song "Almost Blue" is a cover of the same song by Elvis Costello, from his album Imperial Bedroom. With Elmore on vocals, Root on upright bass, and Romanski on drums, the cover also featured former Wilco guitarist Jay Bennett on piano.

== Track listing ==
All songs written by Elizabeth Elmore, except where noted.

1. "Either Coast" – 3:27
2. "Stars of Amateur Hour" – 3:30
3. "Misery by Design" – 3:58
4. "She Turned Your Head..." – 4:22
5. "This Town" – 3:50
6. "Alaskan" – 4:10
7. "The Uselessness of Friends..." – 4:47
8. "Truth" (Elmore, Mike Longo) – 4:03
9. "For the Win" – 10:17
10. "Almost Blue" (Elvis Costello) – 2:57
