= A Mother's Duty =

Painting by Pieter de Hooch

- Artist: Pieter de Hooch
- Year: 1658–1660
- Medium: Oil on canvas
- Dimensions: 52.5 cm × 61 cm (20.7 in × 24 in)
- Location: Amsterdam Museum on loan to the Rijksmuseum; Amsterdam
- Website: Amsterdam Collection online

A Mother's Duty (1658–1660) is an oil-on-canvas Dutch Golden Age painting by the Dutch painter Pieter de Hooch. It is part of the collection of the Amsterdam Museum, on loan to the Rijksmuseum.

== Description ==
This painting by Hooch showing a woman delousing a child's hair was documented by Hofstede de Groot in 1910, who wrote:

71. MOTHER COMBING HER CHILD'S HAIR. Sm. 33, 4, 67; de G. 5. In a homely bedroom sits a woman in profile to the right. She wears a red blouse and blue skirt, and is de-lousing her daughter's hair who kneels before her with her head in her lap. Behind her is an elevated, recessed bed with curtains; a child's chair stands in the right foreground. The door on the left, near which is a little dog, opens into a second room, through the door of which is seen a garden with slender trees. This is one of the finest pictures by De Hooch in Holland. [Compare 74.] Signed on the chair "Pr d' hooch"; canvas on panel, 21 inches by 24 inches. Wrongly attributed to E. Boursse in the 1887 catalogue of the Rijksmuseum ; the signature is absolutely genuine, and is wrongly described as doubtful in the 1905 catalogue.

- Gerard Braamcamp, Amsterdam, July 31, 1771, No. 88 (610 florins, Van der Dussen), (compare also Hoet, ii. 504).
- J. L. van der Dussen, in Amsterdam, October 31, 1774, No. 7 (750 florins).
- J. J. de J. J. de Faesch, in Amsterdam, July 3, 1833, No. 20 (3500 florins plus 7 1/2 per cent, bought in; or 2590 florins, Jansen for Moget).
- Amsterdam, April 24, 1838, No. 18 (3311 florins, Brondgeest). Formerly in the Van der Hoop collection, Amsterdam.
- Now in the Rijksmuseum at Amsterdam, Van der Hoop bequest; No. 1250 in the 1905 catalogue (formerly No. 685).

== Gallery ==
This painting seems to have been a successful design for De Hooch as there are several variations on the subject of this bedroom and its doorway outside:

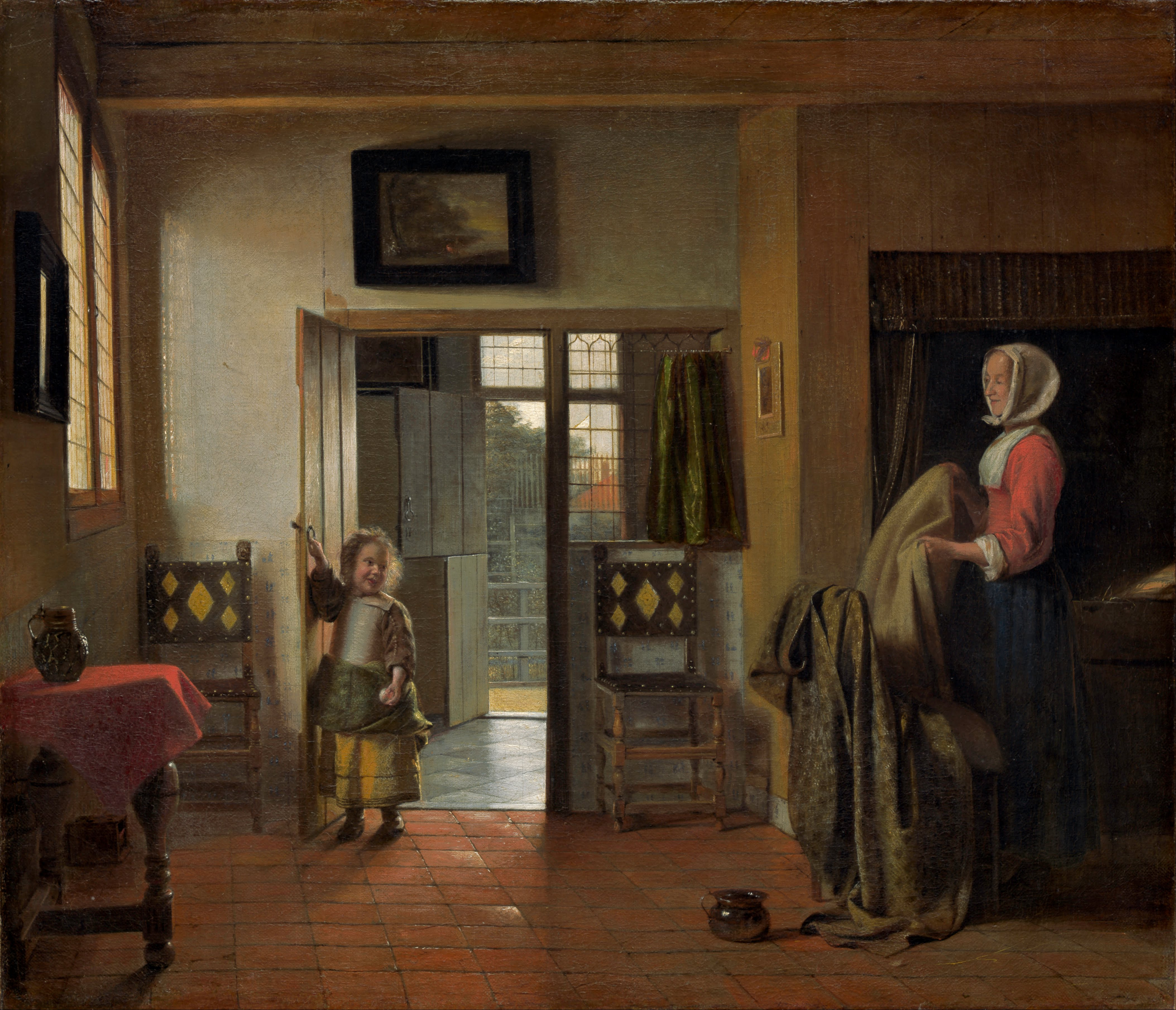
The Bedroom (Widener Collection)

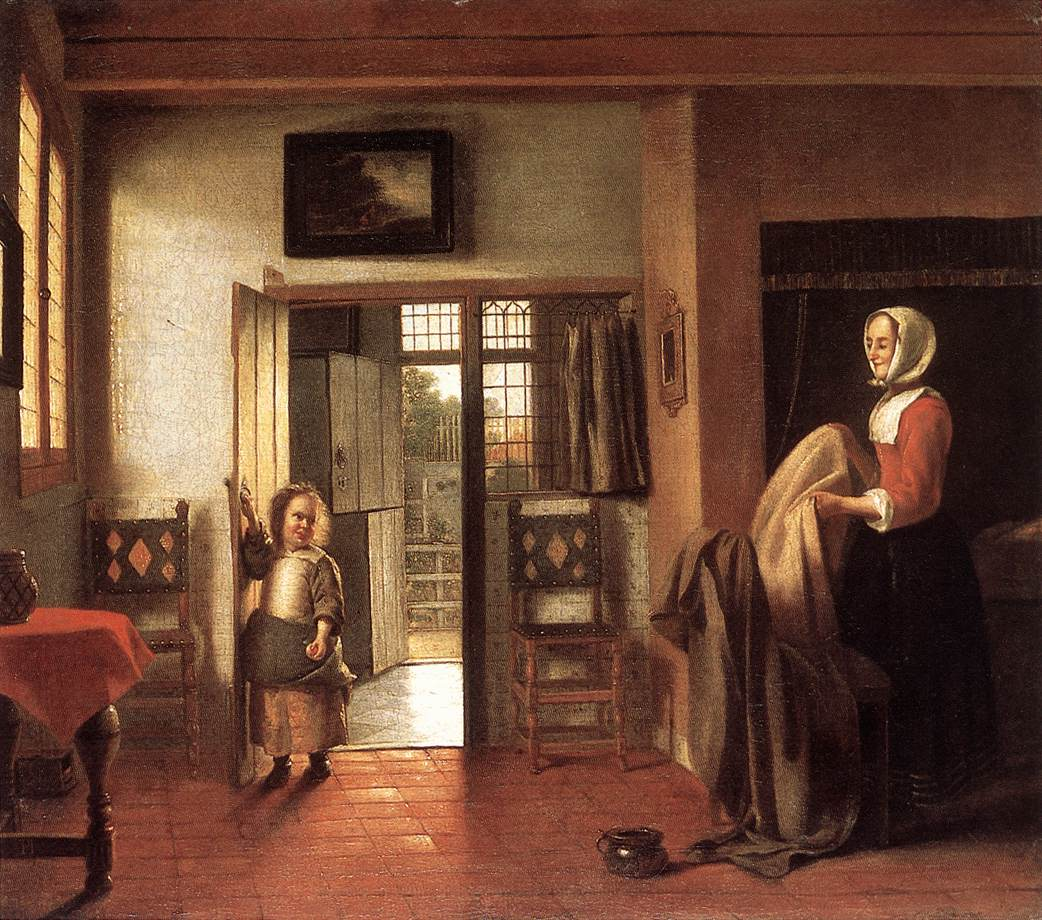
The Bedroom (Karlsruhe)

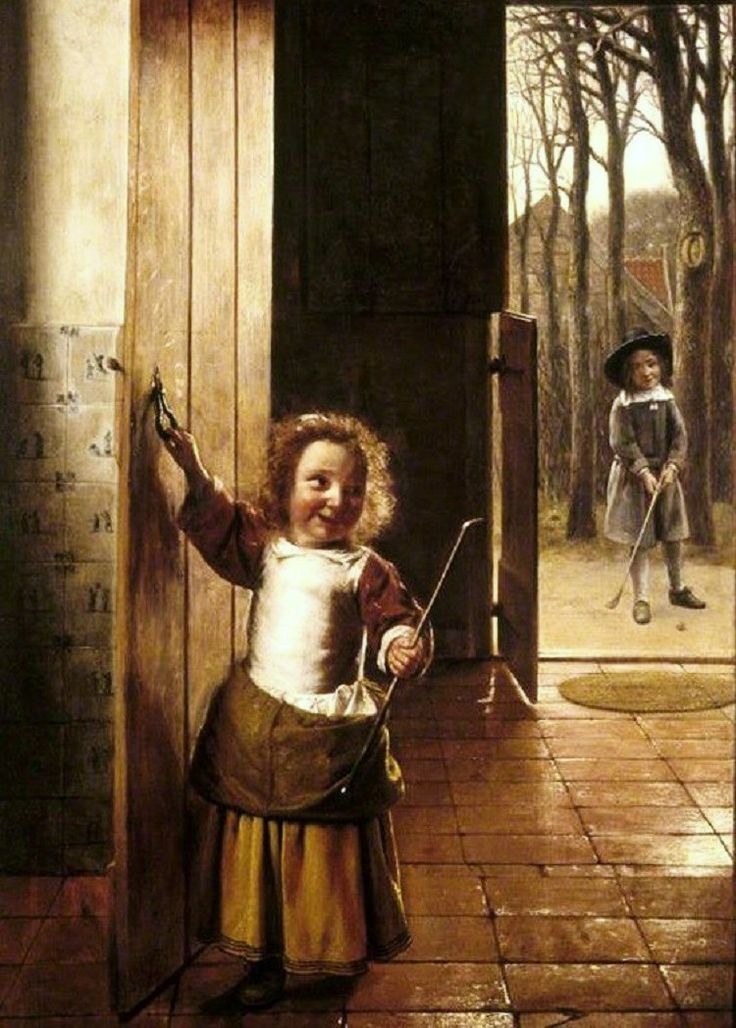
The Golf Players

== See also ==
- List of paintings by Pieter de Hooch
