= The Golf Players =

1658 painting by Pieter de Hooch

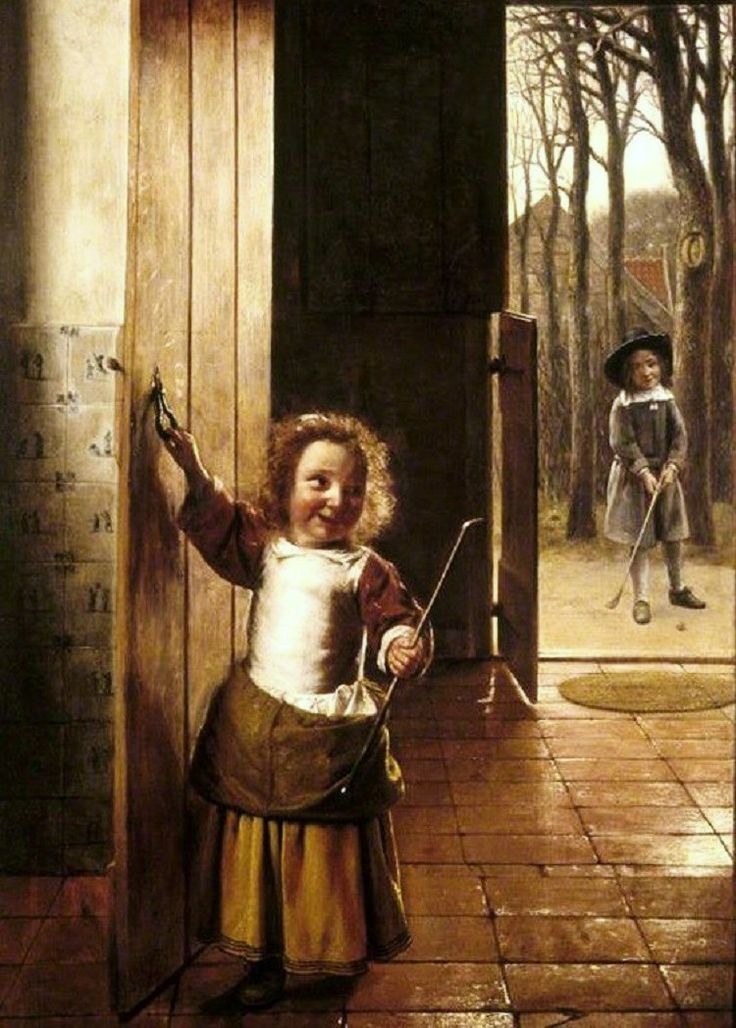
- Artist: Pieter de Hooch
- Year: 1658
- Medium: Oil on panel
- Dimensions: 63.5 cm × 45.7 cm (25.0 in × 18.0 in)
- Location: Polesden Lacey; Surrey

The Golf Players (1658) is an oil-on-panel painting by the Dutch painter Pieter de Hooch. It is an example of Dutch Golden Age painting and is part of the collection of Polesden Lacey.

The painting was documented by Hofstede de Groot in 1910, who wrote: "305. The Game of Golf. In an entrance-hall paved with red tiles a little girl carrying a golf-club stands with her hand on the latch of an open door. She looks at a boy who is playing golf in the courtyard. In the distance is a village. Panel, 25 inches by 18 inches. Formerly in the collection of Count von Fries, Vienna. Sales:

- Heris of Brussels, in Paris, June 19, 1846, No. 27.
- Pierard of Valenciennes, in Paris, March 21, 1860, No. 29.
- Sir H. H. Campbell, in London, 1867 (bought in for £63)."

This painting seems to have been a successful design for de Hooch as there are several variations on the subject of this young girl in the doorway:

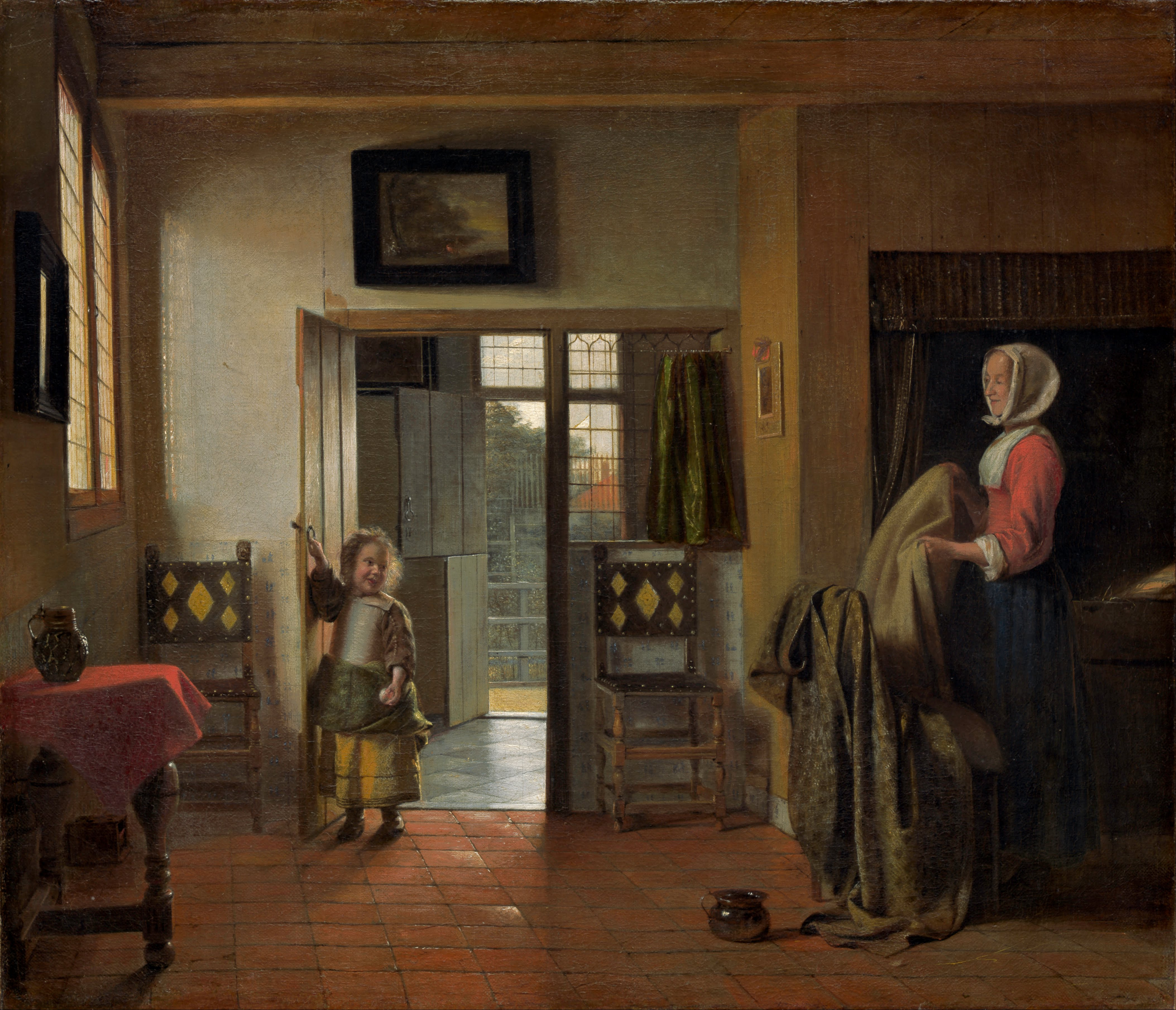
The Bedroom (National Gallery of Art)

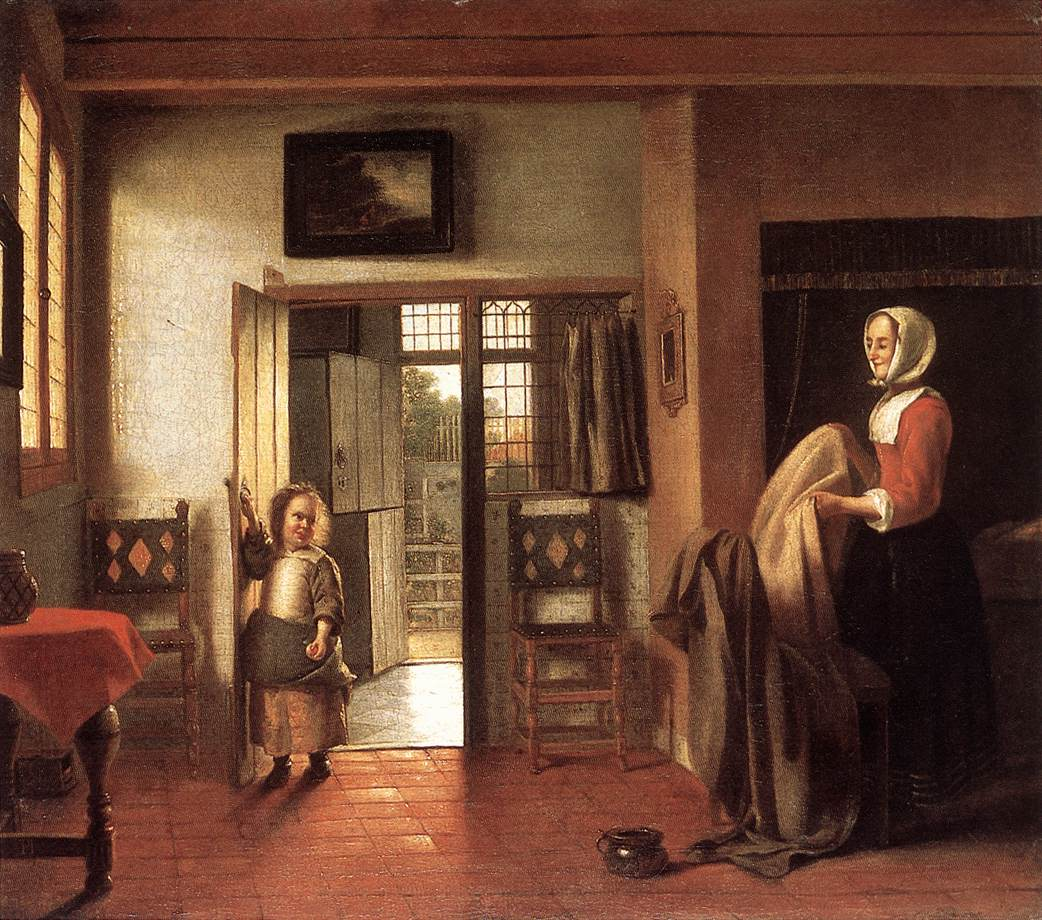
The Bedroom (Karlsruhe)

A Mother's Duty (Rijksmuseum)

== See also ==
- List of paintings by Pieter de Hooch
