= Quietdrive =

American alternative rock band

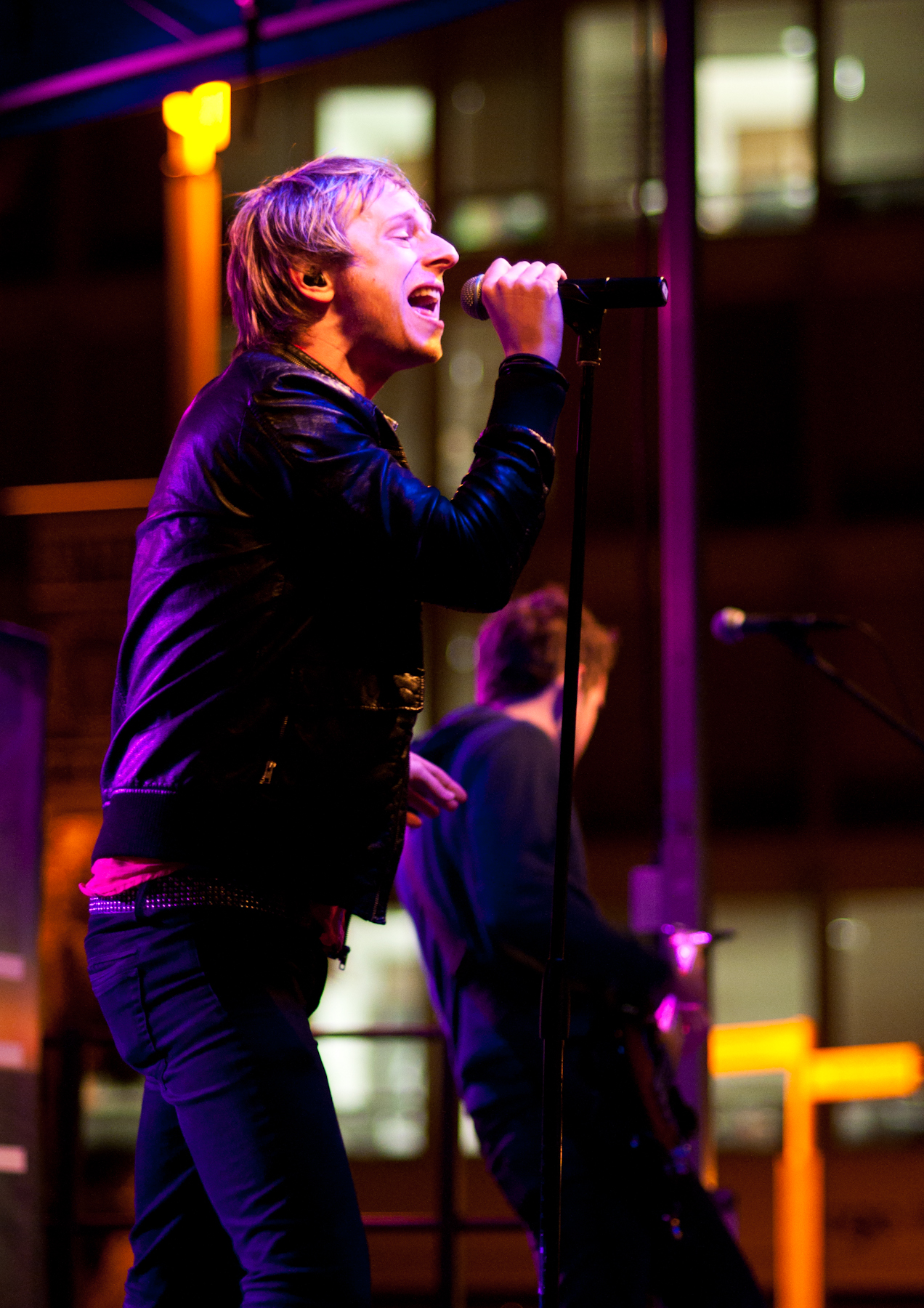
- Kevin Truckenmiller singing for the first annual Revellution at UC San Diego

Background information
- Also known as: Sneaker 2 Bombs (2002-2006)
- Origin: Hopkins, Minnesota, United States
- Genres: Alternative rock, pop punk, emo, hard rock (early)
- Instruments: Guitars, vocals, drums, bass guitar, violin
- Years active: 2002–present
- Labels: Red Ink/Epic (2004–2007); The Militia Group (2008–2009); Sneaker 2 Bombs (2009-) Twilight Records (2014)
- Members: Kevin Truckenmiller; Brandon Lanier; Will Caesar; Brice Niehaus; Brady Trudeau
- Website: www.quietdrivemusic.com

Quietdrive is an alternative rock band based in Hopkins, Minnesota, USA, that was formed in 2002. Quietdrive released their first album, When All That's Left Is You, on May 30, 2006, on Epic Records. In April 2008, Quietdrive left Epic Records and released an album titled Deliverance on October 14, 2008, with the Militia Group. In 2009, they left Militia Group and released an independent EP titled Close Your Eyes on their own record label, Sneaker 2 Bombs Records. Their third full-length album, Quietdrive, was released on December 14, 2010, and a full-length album, Up or Down, on April 24, 2012. The Ghost of What You Used to Be was released on December 16, 2014.

== History ==
The original members of the band attended Armstrong High School in Plymouth, Minnesota and in ninth grade, Brandon Lanier started telling Droo Hastings that he was a great drummer and that they should start a band with him and his friend Justin Bonhiver. Initially, the band was a trio with Hastings as lead singer and bass guitar, Lanier playing drums, and Bonhiver on guitar. The band posted an audition for a lead singer on MP3.com. Kevin Truckenmiller entered the band after submitting his solo work, including an early incarnation of the song "I Go Both Ways", which was named after their friend, Jennings Lane. Matt Kirby began attending Saint John's University with Truckenmiller. The group eventually joined together and formed in 2002 under the name "Sneaker 2 Bombs," a hard rock band which reflected the evolving Minneapolis local music scene.

Quietdrive initially built a following at The Garage in Burnsville, Minnesota. The band pursued music venues in Minneapolis but found better connection with younger crowds and stayed between suburban and city clubs. As Quietdrive, the band recorded demo songs with Eric Trelstad. These songs were heard by Will.I.Am from Black Eyed Peas during a visit to Minneapolis recording studio IPR. Will arranged for the band to retain attorney Peter Lewitt and to showcase in Los Angeles but executives from Interscope passed on signing the band. Afterwards, Truckenmiller began strongly to consider reorganizing the band with inclusion of Matt Kirby. By April 2004, Kirby was officially made a band member and Sneaker2bombs began live performances in local bars including The Lodge. Truckenmiller and Kirby also performed as an acoustic duo at the graduation night for Holy Angels Academy High School in June 2004.

The band put Sneaker2bombs recordings on music industry mp3 sites and Chris Foitle, an intern at Epic Records in Santa Monica, began contacting Bonhiver and Truckenmiller. In July 2004, Epic arranged to see the band perform in Minneapolis with the assistance of Greg Sheldon. Pete Giberga, a Vice President of A&R at Epic's Santa Monica's office, flew in and decided to sign the band. Giberga was familiar with Sui Generis, a young emo act from Apple Valley who Giberga unsuccessfully pursued for Epic in 2003. In early August 2004, Giberga contacted attorney Lewitt and offered a deal memo binding Quietdrive to Epic. Truckenmiller consented. Over the next four months, the band sought advice from industry veterans including Danny Nozell, and emerged with the decision to dismiss Lewitt, hire Sui Generis attorney Jeff Biederman, and negotiate a long form contract with Epic. During this time, Atlantic Records also expressed interest in meeting with the band but that interest was held in check by Epic's deal memo and Epic's executive intimations that it would pursue legal action if it lost the band to another label.

In November 2004, the band flew to New York and met with Epic department heads, including head of A&R Ben Goldman, label chief Steve Barnett, head of marketing Lee Stimmel, and radio-promo heads Joel Klaiman and Jacqueline Saturn. Following that visit, final terms were negotiated and a long form was signed.

When All That's Left Is You is Quietdrive's first LP, produced, engineered and mixed by Matt Kirkwold and James Harley of World Record Productions with additional mixing by Chris Lord-Alge, Mark Endert and Brian King from Burlington Ontario Canada, was released in May 2006. Its first single was "Rise from the Ashes" and was used on EA Sports' NHL 07 soundtrack. In 2006, the band released a cover version of the Cyndi Lauper song "Time After Time" to nationwide radio play. The song is also used for the WNBA "Have You Seen Her?" advertising campaign. The song became a minor hit on pop radio, reaching No. 25 on the syndicated American Top 40 countdown show. It was also used on the soundtrack of the 2006 feature film John Tucker Must Die, and in the trailer for the 2008 remake of the film Prom Night.

After the CD release into 2007, the band had a lengthy US tour and was the "Artist of the Month" on Xbox Live in January 2007. Quietdrive, with producers Kirkwold and Harley, released a new single titled "Pretend" on their AbsolutePunk.net page in early 2007 for fans. Though the band garnered success with Epic Records, in April 2008 they cancelled their contract, partly citing the restricting management of the major music industry.

Quietdrive released their second full-length album Deliverance on October 14, 2008, and supported this album with an extensive tour with announced dates in the US, UK and Japan.

Quietdrive released their EP "Close Your Eyes" independently on October 13, 2009. Their first single was "Jessica". Robby Starbuck produced the music video, which premiered on buzznet.com on December 15, 2009. Shortly after the release of Close Your Eyes, Matt Kirby decided to leave the band. In the summer of 2010, bassist Droo Hastings also decided to leave Quietdrive while the band was touring in support of Close Your Eyes.

Matt Kirby left the band due his first child being born. He became the band's manager shortly after. Several guitarists filled in for him at live shows. including Ryan Irey and Jack Swagger (Machine 22).

The band released their self-titled third studio album on December 14, 2010.

In the summer of 2010 Droo Hastings left the band to pursue his own music and he also was expecting his first child. The band didn't make an official announcement at first. They took him off the official members area on Facebook and fans speculated that he had left the band and the band confirmed soon after. Droo still remains good friends with all the members of Quietdrive and frequents their shows in the Twin Cities.

They were looking for a full-time guitarist and bassist to fill Kirby and Droo's positions in the band. Will Caesar auditioned sometime in mid-2010 and Brice Niehaus auditioned for bassist soon after that. They both played in Milwaukee in August 2010 for the first time with the whole band which Will has said was basically their final audition for the band. Soon after that they were both added as official members of Quietdrive on their official Facebook page.

Quietdrive began a fundraising project on Kickstarter, and on July 31, 2011, just two hours before their deadline, the band exceeded their goal of $15,000 to record the cover album "Your Record Our Spin". The band began recording in October 2011, and intended the album to include 10 songs voted on by fans and one original song. In late December 2011, fans who donated $10 or more via Kickstarter began receiving their copy of the album; the final version only included the ten songs voted on by Kickstarter-donating fans, with an original eleventh track available later for digital download via a password distributed to those who had donated to the fundraising campaign.

On February 1, 2012, Quietdrive released their single "Until the End (Acoustic)" on iTunes, with all proceeds going to the Dean Randazzo Cancer Foundation. A music video was released on YouTube that same day, featuring the Grand Nationals, Colin Kassekert and Phil Costa of the Dallas Cowboys.

On April 24, 2012, Quietdrive released their fourth studio album titled Up or Down. Originally it was going to be an eight-song EP that was to be released late 2011 or early 2012. The release was changed to late spring 2012 due to unforeseen circumstances. In the past, Truckenmiller was the primary songwriter but due to Caesar's writing experience in previous jobs him and Truckenmiller cowrote many of the songs on the album.

On October 10, 2012, Bonhiver announced he was leaving the band to pursue other interests

After two years of some touring and time at home they released their fifth studio record The Ghost of What You Used to Be in December 2014. It was originally planned to release it in mid-2014 but they delayed it to December to release it in the U.S. shortly before their annual holiday show.

In December 2014, Caesar quit as a full-time member of Quietdrive but still plays if no one else is available. In 2015 they did not have plans to release another record but still tour occasionally. The members of the band rotate depending on who is available, including previous members Justin Bonhiver, Droo Hastings, and Matt Kirby.

On April 23, 2019, Quietdrive announced that they were reuniting for their first public show in nearly 4 years, and promised "a lot of surprises" over the coming summer and fall.

== Band members ==
The band members occasionally play instruments other than their primary instruments listed below.

Current members

- Kevin Truckenmiller – vocals/acoustic guitar/violin bass (2002–present)
- Brandon Lanier – drums (2002–present)
- Will Caesar – rhythm guitar/vocals (2010–present)
- Brice Niehaus – bass guitar (2010–present)
- Brady Trudeau – lead guitar (2012–present)

Former members

- Justin Bonhiver – lead guitar (2002–2012)
- Matt Kirby – rhythm guitar/vocals (2002–2009), manager (2009–present)
- Droo Hastings – bass guitar (2002–2010)

== Discography ==
=== Studio albums ===
Year	Title	Details	US Billboard Peak
2006	When All That's Left Is You	Released: May 30, 2006; Label: Epic Records; Format: Digital download, CD	29 Heatseekers
2008	Deliverance	Released: October 14, 2008; Label: The Militia Group; Format: Digital download, CD	1 Alternative New Artist and No. 6 Heatseakers
2010	Quietdrive	Released: December 14, 2010; Label: Sneaker 2 Bombs; Format: Digital download, CD	
2011	Your Record / Our Spin	Released: December 28, 2011; Label: Sneaker 2 Bombs; Format: Digital download, CD	
2012	Up or Down	Released: April 24, 2012; Label: Sneaker 2 Bombs; Format: Digital download, CD	
2014	The Ghost of What You Used to Be	Released: December 16, 2014; Label: Sneaker 2 Bombs; Format: Digital download, CD	

=== Compilation albums ===
Year	Title	Details	Notes
2015	The Best of Quietdrive	Released: May 15, 2015; Label: Twilight Records; Format: CD	Japan-only release

=== Extended plays ===
Year	Title	Details	Notes
2002	Demo	Released: 2002; Label: Self Released	
2003	Leaving Dramatics	Released: November 30, 2003; Label: Self Released	
2004	Quietdrive	Released: August 4, 2004; Label: Epic Records	
2005	Fall from the Ceiling	Released: September 27, 2005; Label: Epic Records; Format: Digital download, CD	Also iTunes exclusive
2006	Rise from the Ashes	Released: March 27, 2006; Label: Epic Records; Format: Digital download, CD	
2009	Close Your Eyes	Released: October 13, 2009; Label: Sneaker 2 Bombs; Format: Digital download, CD	
2012	Every Day	Released: October 3, 2012; Label: Twilight Records; Format: Digital download, CD	Japan-only release

=== Singles ===
Year	Title	Chart Positions					Certifications	Album
Year	Title	US Hot 100	US Pop 100	US Digital Songs	Mainstream Top 40	New Zealand RIANZ Singles	Certifications	Album
2006	"Rise from the Ashes"							When All That's Left Is You
2007	"Time After Time"	102	57	73	25	35	RIAA: Gold	When All That's Left Is You
2008	"Deliverance"							Deliverance
2009	"Jessica"							Close Your Eyes EP
2010	"Way Out"							Quietdrive
2010	"Fading Light"							Quietdrive
2012	"Until The End (Acoustic Version)"							Quietdrive
2013	"Even When I'm Gone"							

=== Music videos ===
- "Rise from the Ashes" (2006), from When All That's Left Is You
- "Jessica" (2009), from Close Your Eyes EP
- "Way Out" (2010), from Quietdrive
- "Until the End (Acoustic Version)" (2011), from Quietdrive
- "Body Out of Bed (feat. Liz Akhavan)" (2013), from Quietdrive
- "Lie to me" (2012), from Up Or Down

=== Lyric videos ===
- "Without My Hands" (2014), from The Ghost Of What You Used To Be
- "On My Own" (2015), from The Ghost Of What You Used To Be

=== Other ===
- Quietdrive's song "Rise from the Ashes" appeared on the EA Sports NHL 07 Soundtrack.
- Quietdrive's song Time After Time appeared in John Tucker Must Die (2006), Prom Night (2008), and Parks and Recreation (Season 5 episode 16).
- Quietdrive's songs "Kissing Your Lips", "Deliverance", and "Hollywood" appeared on the Xbox 360 snowboarding game soundtrack, STOKED(2009)
