= The Glass Intact =

Studio album by Sarge
- Released: 1998
- Length: 39:16
- Label: Mud

Sarge chronology
Charcoal (1996)	The Glass Intact (1998)	Distant (2000)

The Glass Intact is the second album by the Champaign, Illinois band Sarge. It was released in 1998 on Mud Records.

The album was somewhat of a breakout hit, getting a feature-length review at Salon.com and the Village Voice, and causing the band to become a 1998 "Hot Band" in Rolling Stone as well as being one of Spin Magazine's "98 for '98."

== Reception ==
Professional ratings
Review scores
Source	Rating
AllMusic	4.5/5 stars
Spin	(8/10)

Jason Ankeny of AllMusic declared the album to be "a kind of apotheosis of '90s-era girl-punk", finding the album combined the "emotional intensity of Sleater-Kinney, the melodic aggression of Team Dresch, and the sheer exuberance of Cub, yet their best trick of all is that they sound like an absolute original." Ankeny noted that Elizabeth Elmore "a gifted composer, an acute lyricist, and a nakedly honest vocalist", concluding that the album "is at heart a rock & roll album in the classic sense: cathartic, impassioned, and vividly alive." Stephanie Zacharek of Spin also noted the albums debt to riot grrl music with its "explosive emotional intensity", finding the album "nervy, hopelessly seductive and hell-bent for trouble and heartache, The Glass Intact peers at the world through a very dark lens - but the sun, with its menace and warmth is never far from view.

== Track listing ==
1. Stall
2. A Torch
3. Beguiling
4. Charms and Feigns
5. Homewrecker
6. Half as Far
7. I Took You Driving
8. Fast Girls
9. The First Morning
10. Put in the Reel
11. To Keep You Trained

== Credits ==
Credits adapted from the album's liner notes.

- Elizabeth Elmore - guitars, vocals, piano
- Rachel Switzky - bass
- Chad Romanski - drums
- Pat Cramer - additional guitars on tracks 1, 3, 4, and 5
- Matt Allison - engineer, producer
- Sarge - producer
- Brendan Gamble - recording engineer on tracks 3, 5, and 9
