= Time After Time (Cyndi Lauper song) =

1984 single by Cyndi Lauper

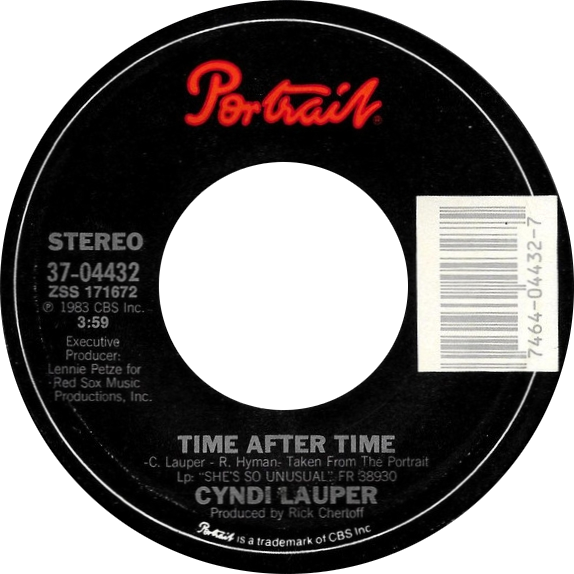
- Side A of the US 7-inch single

Single by Cyndi Lauper

from the album She's So Unusual
- B-side: "I'll Kiss You"
- Released: March 10, 1984
- Recorded: June 1983
- Studio: Record Plant (New York City)
- Genre: Pop; new wave; soft rock
- Length: 4:01
- Label: Epic; Portrait
- Songwriters: Cyndi Lauper; Rob Hyman
- Producer: Rick Chertoff

Cyndi Lauper singles chronology
"Girls Just Want to Have Fun" (1983)	"Time After Time" (1984)	"She Bop" (1984)

Music video
- "Time After Time" on YouTube

"Time After Time" is a song by the American pop singer Cyndi Lauper from her debut album, She's So Unusual (1983). It was released as the album's second single in March 1984, by Epic and Portrait Records. Written by Lauper and Rob Hyman, who also provided backing vocals, the song was produced by Rick Chertoff. It was written in the album's final stages, after "Girls Just Want to Have Fun", "She Bop" and "All Through the Night" had been written or recorded. The writing began with the title, which Lauper had seen in TV Guide, referring to the science fiction film Time After Time (1979).

"Time After Time" received positive reviews from music critics, with many commending it as a solid and memorable love song. It has since been named as one of the greatest pop songs of all time by many media outlets, including Rolling Stone, Nerve, and MTV. The song was also nominated for the Grammy Award for Song of the Year at the 27th Annual Grammy Awards. Commercially, "Time After Time" was another success for Lauper, becoming her first No. 1 hit single in the United States, topping the Billboard Hot 100 on June 9, 1984, and remaining at the top for two weeks. It additionally peaked at No. 6 on the Australian Kent Music Report chart and No. 3 on the UK singles chart.

== Background and recording ==
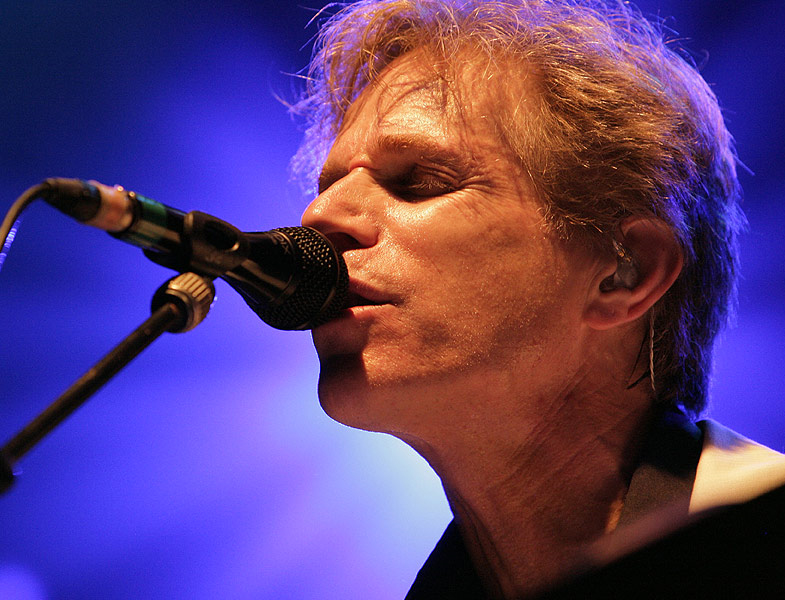
Rob Hyman co-wrote and sings backing vocals on the track.

Although "Time After Time" would eventually become one of Lauper's signature songs, it was one of the last songs on her debut studio album to be recorded. While Lauper was still writing material for She's So Unusual in early 1983, her producer, Rick Chertoff introduced her to American musician Rob Hyman, a founding member of the Hooters. Lauper had by then already recorded the majority of the album, including the songs "Girls Just Want to Have Fun" and "She Bop," but Chertoff insisted that she and Hyman needed to record just "one more song". Therefore, she and Hyman sat at a piano and started working on "Time After Time".

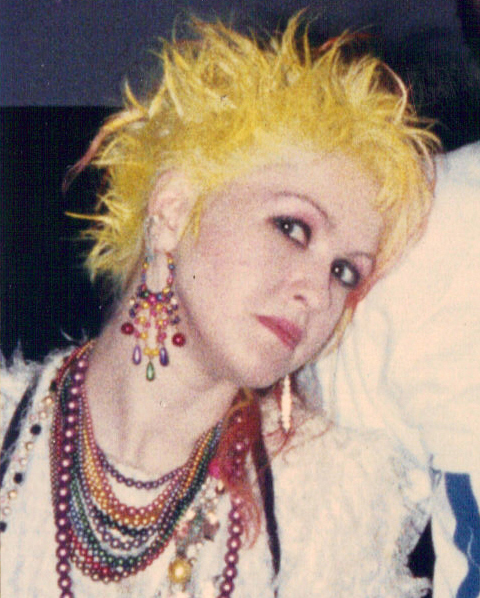
Cyndi Lauper, 1985

The inspiration for the song came from the fact that both songwriters were going through similar challenges in their respective romantic relationships; Hyman was coming out of a relationship, and Lauper was having difficulties with her boyfriend and manager, David Wolff. One of the early lines Rob Hyman wrote was "suitcase of memories", which according to Lauper, "struck her", claiming it was a "wonderful line", and other lines came from Lauper's life experiences. The song's title was borrowed from a TV Guide listing for the science fiction film Time After Time (1979), which Lauper had intended to use only as a temporary placeholder during the writing process. Although she later tried to change the song's name, she said that she felt at some point that "Time After Time" had become so fundamental to the song that it would fall apart with a different title.

Initially, Epic Records wanted "Time After Time" as the album's lead single. However, Lauper felt that releasing a ballad as her debut solo single would have pigeonholed her stylistically as a balladeer, limiting her future work and thus potentially killing her career. Wolff felt that "Girls Just Want to Have Fun" could become a successful pop anthem and was a better choice; ultimately the label agreed and released it as the lead single. "Time After Time" became the album's second single, released on March 27, 1984.

== Composition and lyrics ==
Written by Cyndi Lauper and Rob Hyman and produced by Rick Chertoff, "Time After Time" is built over simple keyboard-synth chords, bright, jangly guitars, clock ticking percussion, and elastic bassline. Lyrically, the track is a love song of devotion. Pam Avoledo of Blogcritics speculates that, "In 'Time After Time,' the speaker believes she is a difficult person, unworthy of love. She runs away and shuts people out. However, her devoted boyfriend who loves her unconditionally is willing to help her through anything. The relationship is given depth. The couple's intimacy and history is apparent. They've been together for a long time. They love and have seen each other through every tough part of their life."

"Time After Time" is written in the key of C major with a tempo of 130 beats per minute in common time. Lauper's vocals span from G_{3} to C_{5} in the song.

== Critical reception ==
The song received critical acclaim:

- Sal Cinquemani of Slant Magazine praised the track, calling it "the album's finest moment, if not Lauper's greatest moment period."
- Susan Glen of PopMatters also called it a standout track, naming it "gorgeous".
- Bryan Lee Madden of Sputnikmusic simply called it "a masterpiece" and "the best and most significant song she ever wrote or recorded."
- Brenon Veevers of Renowned for Sound labeled it "sentimental" and "gorgeous".
- Scott Floman, music critic for Goldmine magazine, described the song as "gorgeously heartfelt" and "one of the decade's finest ballads".
- Chris Gerard of Metro Weekly summarized the song as a "beautiful and bittersweet ballad."
- Cashbox said that the song "is a gentle, reflective tune that displays the deep resonance of Lauper's vocal talents."

=== Accolades ===
"Time After Time" has entered many lists of "Best Love Songs of All Time", "Best Ballads from the 80s" and others. Bill Lamb, also from About.com, placed the song at number 21 on his "Top 100 Best Love Songs of All Time" list. On Nerve's list of "The 50 Greatest Love Songs of All Time", "Time After Time" was placed at number 5, being called "Lauper's most enduring masterpiece hits at the very essence of commitment," with the article pointing out that "she captures real romance in the most simple and straightforward of lines: 'If you're lost, you can look and you will find me, time after time'."

The song also appeared on Rolling Stone and MTV's "100 Greatest Pop Songs" at number 66. The song also entered VH1's "100 Best Songs of the Past 25 Years and "100 Greatest Songs of the 80s" lists, at numbers 22 and 19 respectively. The song was also on NME's 100 Best Songs of the 1980s, ranked number 79. The website declared that "'Time After Time' was a change in tack for Lauper, whose musical persona had previously been unstoppably light and frothy. 'Time After Time' was demoed quickly in time for inclusion on her debut 'She's So Unusual', and ended up being a key song for both Lauper's career and the decade itself."

=== Awards and nominations ===
Won

- 1984 – American Video Awards for Best Female Performance
- 1984 – American Video Awards for Best Pop Video
- 1984 – BMI Awards for Pop Award
- 1984 – Billboard Awards for Best Female Performance
- 1985 – Pro Canada Awards for Most Performed Foreign Song
- 2008 – BMI Millionaire Award for 5 Million Spins on US Radio
- 2009 – BMI Awards for Pop Award

Nominations

- 1984 – MTV Video Music Award for Best New Artist
- 1984 – MTV Video Music Award for Best Female Video
- 1984 – MTV Video Music Award for Best Direction
- 1985 – Grammy Award for Song of the Year

==== Lists of best songs ====
Year	By	List	Work	Ranked
2000	Rolling Stone	100 Greatest Pop Songs	"Time After Time"	#66
2000	MTV	100 Greatest Pop Songs	"Time After Time"	#66
2003	VH1	100 Best Songs of the Past 25 Years	"Time After Time"	#22
2006	VH1	100 Greatest Songs of the 80s	"Time After Time"	#19
2021	Rolling Stone	500 Greatest Songs of All Time	"Time After Time"	#494

== Chart performance ==
"Time After Time" became Lauper's first number-one single on the Billboard charts, reaching the top of the Billboard Hot 100 chart in June 1984. It also reached the top of the U.S. Adult Contemporary list, and The Record's and RPM Top Singles charts in Canada. In Europe, the single peaked at number 2, on July 9, 1984. In New Zealand, the song reached number 3, in Austria it reached number 5, in Switzerland it reached number 7, in France it peaked at number 9 and in Sweden it reached a peak of number 10. In Mexico's Notitas Musicales or Hit Parade the song was number 2 for four weeks, beginning on June 15, 1984.

In the United Kingdom, "Time After Time" debuted at number 69 on March 24, 1984 and initially peaked at number 54 two weeks later. The single later re-entered the charts on June 9, 1984 and climbed to a new peak of number 3 six weeks later, becoming Cyndi's second top 10 single in the country. For the re-release, the song was supported by a radio campaign by the record label Starblend who included it on a compilation album titled Broken Dreams.

When the song reached number 3 of the Billboard Hot 100, Cyndi Lauper become only the second female artist of the rock era to reach the Top 3 of the chart with her first two chart entries following Petula Clark.

Before its official release as a single, "Time After Time" charted on the Billboard Top Rock Tracks chart, debuting in the week of December 17, 1983. After its single release, it peaked at number 10 on the chart in May 1984.

A version from Lauper's ninth studio album, The Body Acoustic (2005), featuring Canadian singer-songwriter Sarah McLachlan, reached No. 14 on the Adult Contemporary chart.

== Music video ==
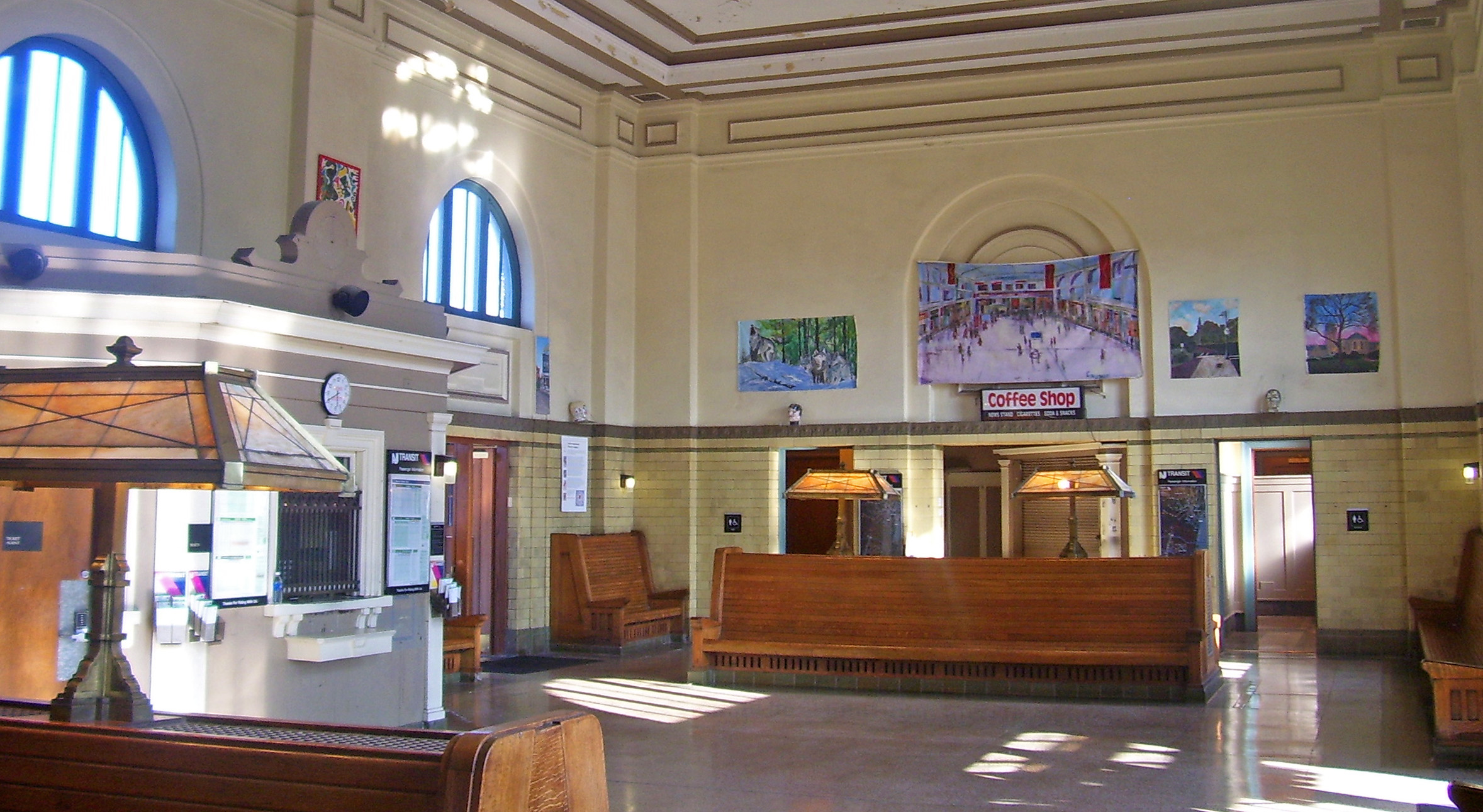
Morristown, New Jersey, train station, seen at the end of the video.

The video for "Time After Time" was directed by Edd Griles, who had directed the music video for "Girls Just Want to Have Fun". The video follows a young woman leaving her lover behind. Lauper's mother, brother, and boyfriend, Dave Wolff, appear in the video, and Lou Albano, who played her father in the "Girls Just Want to Have Fun" video, can be seen as a cook. Portions of the video were filmed at the Tom's Diner, since demolished, in Roxbury, New Jersey, the intersection of Route 46 and Route 10, and at the Morristown train station.

Portions of the video were also shot in front of Betty's Department Store in Wharton, New Jersey, which was a staple of the community in the 1970s. According to Lauper, "It was important to me that we were natural and human in the video. I wanted to convey somebody who walked her own path and did not always get along with everyone and did not always marry the guy." The video opens with Lauper watching the adventure drama romance film The Garden of Allah (1936), and in the final scene, where she gets on the train and waves goodbye to David, Lauper is crying.

The music video began receiving airplay on MTV in late March 1984.

== Track listings ==
European 12" single

1. "Time After Time" – 4:01 (Cyndi Lauper, Rob Hyman)
2. "I'll Kiss You" – 4:12 (Cyndi Lauper, Jules Shear)
3. "Girls Just Want to Have Fun" (extended version) – 6:08 (Robert Hazard)
4. "Girls Just Want to Have Fun" (instrumental) – 7:10 (Robert Hazard)

US vinyl, 7-inch single

1. "Time After Time" – 3:52
2. "I'll Kiss You" – 4:05

== Personnel ==
- Written by Cyndi Lauper, Rob Hyman
- Produced by Rick Chertoff
- Executive producer: Lennie Petze
- Associate producer: William Wittman
- Engineered by William Wittman
- Arranged by Cyndi Lauper, Rick Chertoff, Rob Hyman, Eric Bazilian

=== Musicians ===
- Cyndi Lauper – lead vocals; backing vocals
- Rob Hyman – keyboards; backing vocals
- Peter Wood – synthesizers
- Eric Bazilian – electric guitar
- Anton Fig – drums

== Charts ==
=== Weekly charts ===
1984 weekly chart performance for "Time After Time"
Chart (1984)	Peak position
Australia (Kent Music Report)	6
Austria (Ö3 Austria Top 40)	5
Belgium (Ultratop 50 Flanders)	3
Belgium (VRT Top 30 Flanders)	3
Canada (The Record)	1
Canada Top Singles (RPM)	1
Canada Adult Contemporary (RPM)	1
Canada (CHUM)	2
Chile (Clasificación Nacional del Disco)	1
Colombia (UPI)	3
Denmark (Hitlisten)	10
Europe (Eurochart Hot 100)	2
France (SNEP)	9
Ireland (IRMA)	2
Israel (IBA)	2
Italy (Discografia internazionale)	4
Italy (Musica e dischi)	3
Luxembourg (Radio Luxembourg)	3
Netherlands (Single Top 100)	8
Netherlands (Dutch Top 40)	5
Mexico Hit Parade (RPM)	2
New Zealand (Recorded Music NZ)	3
Paraguay (UPI)	6
South Africa (Springbok Radio)	25
Sweden (Sverigetopplistan)	10
Switzerland (Schweizer Hitparade)	7
UK Singles (Official Charts)	3
US Billboard Hot 100	1
US Adult Contemporary (Billboard)	1
US Mainstream Rock Airplay (Billboard)	10
US Adult Contemporary (Radio & Records)	1
US AOR/Hot Tracks (Radio & Records)	12
US Contemporary Hit Radio (Radio & Records)	1
US Hot R&B/Hip-Hop Songs (Billboard)	78
US Cash Box Top 100	1
Venezuela (UPI)	2
West Germany (GfK)	6
Zimbabwe (ZIMA)	1

2012 weekly chart performance for "Time After Time"
Chart (2012)	Peak position
Japan Hot 100 (Billboard)	56

2025 weekly chart performance for "Time After Time"
Chart (2025)	Peak position
Israel International Airplay (Media Forest)	6

=== Featuring Sarah McLachlan (2005) ===
2005 weekly chart performance for "Time After Time" featuring Sarah McLachlan
Chart (2005–06)	Peak position
Canada Adult Contemporary (Radio & Records)	17
Canada Digital Songs (Billboard)	28
US Adult Contemporary (Billboard)	14
US Dance Airplay (Billboard)	20
France (SNEP)	170

=== US re-release (2014) ===
2014 weekly chart performance for "Time After Time" (re-release)
Chart (2014)	Peak position
US Dance Club Songs (Billboard)	2
US Hot Dance/Electronic Songs (Billboard)	30
US Hot Singles Sales (Billboard)	17

=== Year-end charts ===
1984 year-end chart performance for "Time After Time"
Chart (1984)	Position
Australia (Kent Music Report)	40
Belgium (Ultratop 50 Flanders)	38
Canada Top Singles (RPM)	8
Netherlands (Single Top 100)	69
Netherlands (Dutch Top 40)	46
New Zealand (RIANZ)	44
Switzerland (Schweizer Hitparade)	20
UK Singles (OCC)	25
US Billboard Hot 100	17
US Adult Contemporary (Billboard)	4
US Cash Box Top 100	18
US Adult Contemporary (Radio & Records)	5
US Contemporary Hit Radio (Radio & Records)	8
West Germany (Media Control)	36

=== US re-release ===
2014 year-end chart performance for "Time After Time" (re-release)
Chart (2014)	Position
US Dance Club Songs (Billboard)	35

== Certifications ==
Region	Certification	Certified units/sales
Canada (Music Canada) physical	Platinum	100,000^{^}
Denmark (IFPI Danmark)	Platinum	90,000^{‡}
Germany (BVMI)	Gold	300,000^{‡}
Italy (FIMI) sales since 2009	Platinum	100,000^{‡}
Japan (RIAJ) digital	Gold	100,000^{*}
New Zealand (RMNZ)	4× Platinum	120,000^{‡}
Portugal (AFP)	Gold	20,000^{‡}
Spain (Promusicae)	Platinum	60,000^{‡}
United Kingdom (BPI) digital sales since 2005	2× Platinum	1,200,000^{‡}
United Kingdom (BPI) physical sales – 1984	Silver	250,000^{^}
United States (RIAA)	5× Platinum	5,000,000^{‡}
^{*} Sales figures based on certification alone.^{^} Shipments figures based on certification alone.^{‡} Sales+streaming figures based on certification alone.

== Release history ==
Region	Date	Format(s)	Label(s)	ID	Ref.
United Kingdom	March 12, 1984	7-inch single; 12-inch single	Epic	A4290; TA4290	
United Kingdom	July 9, 1984	7-inch Picture disc single	Epic	WA4290	

== Cover versions ==
=== Miles Davis versions ===
Jazz trumpeter Miles Davis, perhaps the earliest artist to interpret the song, recorded an instrumental version of the song for his studio album You're Under Arrest (1985). The song became a regular part of Davis's live concerts until the end of his career, such as on Live Around the World (a live compilation recorded 1988 to 1991, released 1996). Lauper later stated that while the song has been recorded by dozens of musicians, "The most honored I ever felt was when Miles Davis covered it", adding: "the way he played it was pure magic."

=== INOJ version ===
American R&B singer INOJ recorded her Miami bass version of the song in 1998. It peaked at number six on the U.S. Billboard Hot 100 chart. The music video of this version first aired on BET and The Box.

==== Weekly charts ====
Chart (1998)	Peak position
Australia (ARIA Charts)	88
Canada (Nielsen SoundScan)	7
New Zealand (Recorded Music NZ)	10
US Billboard Hot 100	6
US Dance Singles Sales (Billboard)	42
US Hot R&B/Hip-Hop Songs (Billboard)	30
US Pop Airplay (Billboard)	21
US Rhythmic Airplay (Billboard)	9

==== Year-end charts ====
Chart (1998)	Position
US Billboard Hot 100	64

==== Certifications ====
Region	Certification	Certified units/sales
United States (RIAA)	Gold	500,000^{^}
^{^} Shipments figures based on certification alone.

=== Novaspace version ===
Novaspace, a German Eurodance project, covered the song on their debut studio album Supernova (2003). It reached number six in Germany, number seven in Austria, and number 15 in Australia.

==== Track listings ====
Australia, European and U.S. CD single

1. "Time After Time" (radio edit) – 3:43
2. "Time After Time" (Time mix) – 5:36
3. "Time After Time" (After Time mix) – 6:29
4. "Time After Time" (Novaspace mix) – 6:06
5. "Time After Time" (instrumental) – 6:06

Sweden CD single

1. "Time After Time" (UK radio edit) – 3:18
2. "Time After Time" (Time mix) – 5:36
3. "Time After Time" (After Time mix) – 6:32
4. "Time After Time" (Novaspace mix) – 6:06
5. "Time After Time" (Sol Productions remix) – 6:14
6. "Time After Time" (Pascal remix) – 6:30

UK CD single

1. "Time After Time" (radio edit) – 3:18
2. "Time After Time" (Pascal remix) – 6:32
3. "Time After Time" (Time mix) – 5:36

UK 12-inch vinyl

1. "Time After Time" (Time mix)
2. "Time After Time" (I Nation remix)
3. "Time After Time" (Nick Skitz remix)

==== Weekly charts ====
Chart (2002–2003)	Peak position
Australia (ARIA)	15
Australian Dance (ARIA)	3
Austria (Ö3 Austria Top 40)	7
Europe (Eurochart Hot 100)	25
Germany (GfK)	6
Ireland (IRMA)	42
Netherlands (Dutch Top 40)	33
Netherlands (Single Top 100)	28
Scottish Singles Sales (Official Charts)	19
Switzerland (Schweizer Hitparade)	67
UK Singles (Official Charts)	29
UK Dance (Official Charts)	12

==== Year-end charts ====
Chart (2002)	Position
Australian Dance (ARIA)	20
Austria (Ö3 Austria Top 40)	62
Germany (Media Control)	82

=== Quietdrive version ===
American alternative rock band Quietdrive covered the song for their debut studio album When All That's Left Is You (2006). The cover version was featured in the romantic comedy film John Tucker Must Die (2006), starring Jesse Metcalfe and Brittany Snow. The cover is their only charting song, hitting number 25 on the Mainstream Top 40 Countdown. The cover was certified gold by the RIAA.

==== Weekly charts ====
Chart (2007)	Peak position
New Zealand (Recorded Music NZ)	35
US Hot Digital Songs (Billboard)	73
US Mainstream Top 40 (Billboard)	25

==== Certifications ====
Region	Certification	Certified units/sales
United States (RIAA)	Gold	500,000^{‡}
^{‡} Sales+streaming figures based on certification alone.

=== Dash Berlin, DubVision & Emma Hewitt version ===
Dutch electronic music group Dash Berlin, Dutch DJ duo DubVision and Australian singer Emma Hewitt released a cover of the song on December 15, 2022.

=== Cyril and Tones and I version ===
==== Charts ====
Chart performance
Chart (2026)	Peak position
Australia Airplay (RCS)	18
Chile Anglo Airplay (Monitor Latino)	10
CIS Airplay (TopHit)	174
Lithuania Airplay (TopHit)	18
Panama Anglo Airplay (Monitor Latino)	8
Romania Airplay (TopHit)	61

=== Other versions ===
Husband-and-wife jazz duo Tuck & Patti recorded a cover on their debut album "Tears of Joy".

In 1993, Mark Williams and Tara Morice recorded a cover for the Strictly Ballroom soundtrack.

Lauper did a parody of the song on a 1995 episode of Late Show with David Letterman as "Lactose Intolerant".

American indie rock band Sarge recorded a cover of the song in 1997, which was included on a 7" single that year. In 2000, it appeared on their compilation album Distant. AllMusic's Mike DaRonco said that their version "outshines the original."

On her 1999 tribute album to Miles Davis, Traveling Miles, jazz singer Cassandra Wilson included her Miles-infused, jazz vocal version of Lauper's "Time After Time".

Eva Cassidy recorded a cover of the song, which was included on her posthumous album of the same name in 2000.

Lil' Mo recorded a cover of the song for her debut studio album Based on a True Story (2001).

Uncle Kracker covered the song for the science fiction action comedy film Clockstoppers (2002).

A UK garage version, released in 2002 by Distant Soundz, was a top 20 hit in the UK, peaking at No. 20 on the UK Singles Chart and No. 4 on the UK Dance Singles Chart.

American contemporary Christian music artist Nichole Nordeman recorded a live version on her 2003 album Live at the Door.

On Billboard charts for the week ending May 14, 2011, Javier Colon's version peaked at number 65 on Hot 100, number 41 on Digital Song Sales number four on Top Heatseekers and number sixteen on R&B/Hip-Hop Digital Songs Sales.

British Synthwave band Gunship covered the song on their 2018 album Dark All Day. In 2026 unused footage from the 2025 film Whistle was used to create a music video for the cover.

Swedish duo Undressd released a cover of the song on March 12, 2021.

Sam Smith released a cover also in March of 2021, as part of the release of the album Love Goes: Live at Abbey Road Studios.

A cover version by British-Swedish-Spanish singer Mabel featured in the McDonald's Christmas commercial in the UK in 2021, and peaked at No. 71 on the UK Singles Chart.

== In popular culture ==
The song was featured in the comedy film Romy and Michele's High School Reunion (1997). Director David Mirkin explained that he felt it "was the only song that had the proper emotion" to fit the scene.

The song is featured in the independent coming-of-age comedy film Napoleon Dynamite (2004).

The song was featured in the Snow Ball dance scene in Netflix series Stranger Things season 2 as Nancy Wheeler dances with her brother's (Mike) best friend Dustin Henderson after he was rejected by another girl. The song also made a comeback to Generation Z.

The song was featured in the film Where'd You Go, Bernadette.

The cover by Eva Cassidy was used in the popular series Smallville.

The Sam Smith version was used in the final sequence of Love, Victor's season 2 finale.

== See also ==
- List of number-one singles of 1984 (Canada)
- List of Billboard Hot 100 number ones of 1984
- List of Hot Adult Contemporary number ones of 1984
- List of Cash Box Top 100 number-one singles of 1984
