= Deliverance (Quietdrive album) =

Studio album by Quietdrive
- Released: October 14, 2008
- Recorded: 2007–2008 (Minneapolis, Minnesota)
- Genre: Alternative rock
- Length: 44:41
- Label: The Militia Group

Quietdrive chronology
When All That's Left Is You (2006)	Deliverance (2008)	Quietdrive (2010)

Professional ratings
Review scores
Source	Rating
AllMusic	4/5 stars
AbsolutePunk.net	58%

Deliverance is the second full-length studio album from American rock band Quietdrive, released on October 14, 2008 through The Militia Group.

== Track listing ==
All songs written by Kevin Truckenmiller.

1. "Believe" - 3:32
2. "Deliverance" - 3:22
3. "Daddy's Little Girl" - 3:43
4. "Motivation" - 2:50
5. "Birthday" - 3:14 (written by Lisa Rogers)
6. "Afterall" - 2:59
7. "Pretend" - 3:09
8. "Hollywood" - 2:56
9. "Kissing Your Lips" - 2:58
10. "Take Me Now" - 3:59
11. "Promise Me" - 3:13
12. "Secret" - 4:18
13. "Starbright" - 4:28
