= Alcove (architecture) =

Recessed section of a room

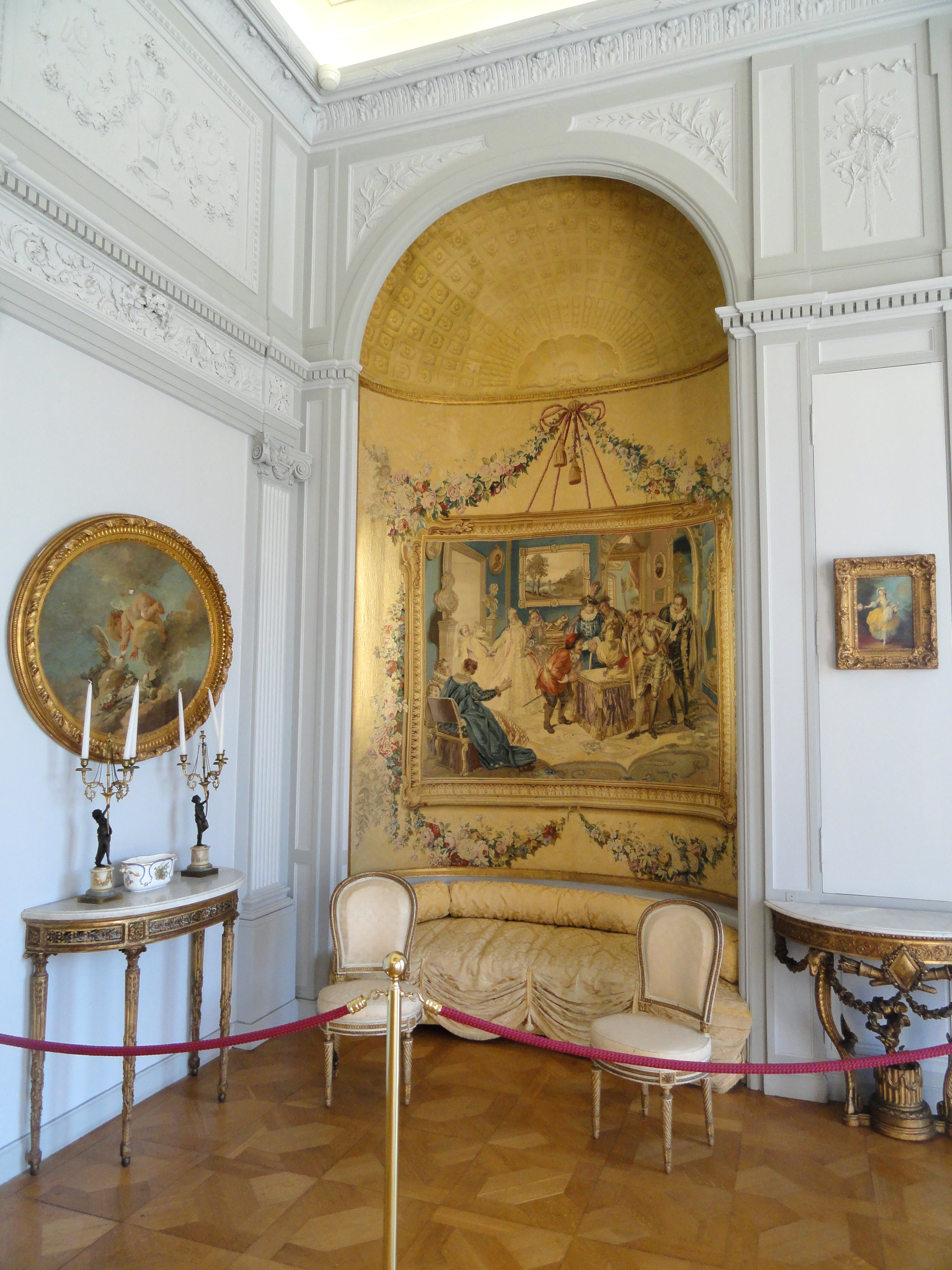
A semi-dome surmounting an alcove in the Villa Ephrussi de Rothschild

In architecture, an alcove is a small recessed section of a room or an arched opening (as in a wall). The section is partially enclosed by such vertical elements as walls, pillars, and balustrades.

== Etymology ==
The word alcove originates from Arabic القبة ([ʔalqubːa]), al- 'the' and qubbah 'vault' (through the Spanish alcoba).

== See also ==
- Niche (architecture)
- Mihrab
- Box-bed
- Tokonoma
- Setback (architecture)
