= Distant (album) =

Compilation album by Sarge
- Released: 2000
- Genre: Indie rock
- Labels: Mud; Parasol

Sarge chronology
The Glass Intact (1998)	Distant (2000)

Professional ratings
Review scores
Source	Rating
AllMusic	3/5 stars
Robert Christgau	A−

Distant is the final, posthumous, album by indie rock band Sarge. Released in 2000 on Mud Records, it features three demo versions of unreleased songs, six live songs, three cover songs, and two solo acoustic numbers by lead singer Elizabeth Elmore.

== Track listing ==
1. "Detroit Star-Lite"
2. "The End of July"
3. "Clearer"
4. "Stall" (Live)
5. "Fast Girls" (Live)
6. "Half as Far" (Live)
7. "Dear Josie, Love Robyn" (Live)
8. "Homewreaker" (Live)
9. "The First Morning" (Live)
10. "These Boots Are Made for Walkin'"
11. "Last Christmas"
12. "Time After Time"
13. "Distant"
14. "All My Plans Changed..."
