= Bad Reputation =

Bad Reputation may refer to:

== Music ==
=== Albums ===
- Bad Reputation (Dirty White Boy album), or the title song, 1990
- Bad Reputation (Joan Jett album), or the title song (see below), 1980
- Bad Reputation (Kid Rock album), 2022
- Bad Reputation (Thin Lizzy album), or the title song (see below), 1977
- Bad Reputation (David Wilcox album), or the title song, 1984
- Bad Reputation, by the Ritchie Family, 1979
- Bad Reputation, by Vacca, 2020

=== Songs ===
- "Bad Reputation" (Adelitas Way song), 2016
- "Bad Reputation" (Joan Jett song), 1980; covered by Avril Lavigne, 2012
- "Bad Reputation" (Freedy Johnston song), 1994
- "Bad Reputation" (Thin Lizzy song), 1977
- "Bad Reputation", by Avicii from Tim, 2019
- "Bad Reputation", by Damn Yankees from Damn Yankees, 1990
- "Bad Reputation", by the dB's from Stands for Decibels, 1981
- "Bad Reputation", by Donna Summer from All Systems Go, 1987
- "Bad Reputation", by Kelly Clarkson from Piece by Piece, 2015
- "Bad Reputation", by Shawn Mendes from Illuminate, 2016
- "Bad Reputation", by Vixen from Rev It Up, 1990

== Film, television and theatre ==
- Bad Reputation (2005 film), an American horror film
- Bad Reputation (2018 film), a 2018 American film about the rock musician Joan Jett
- "Bad Reputation" (Glee), a 2010 episode of Glee
- "Bad Reputation", an episode of Holby City
- Bad Reputation, a performance piece by Penny Arcade

== See also ==
- Reputation, an evaluation or opinion of one's social standing or character
- Reputation (disambiguation)
