= When All That's Left Is You =

Studio album by Quietdrive
- Released: May 30, 2006
- Recorded: Minneapolis, Minnesota; Atlanta, Georgia
- Genre: Emo
- Length: 31:20
- Label: Epic
- Producer: Butch Walker; Matt Kirkwold

Quietdrive chronology
| Rise from the Ashes EP (2006) | When All That's Left Is You (2006) | Deliverance (2008) |

Singles from When All That's Left Is You
- 1. "Rise from the Ashes" Released: 2006; 2. "Time After Time" Released: 2007

Professional ratings
Review scores
| Source | Rating |
|---|---|
| AbsolutePunk | 4.5/5 stars |
| AllMusic | 2.5/5 stars |

When All That's Left Is You is the debut studio album by Quietdrive. It was released through Epic Records on May 30, 2006.

The single "Rise from the Ashes" is featured on the soundtrack of both NHL 07 and ATV Offroad Fury Pro.

All of the songs on the album were written by lead singer Kevin Truckenmiller and Quietdrive, with the exception of Track 9, which is the cover of "Time After Time" by Cyndi Lauper.

== Track listing ==
All songs written by Kevin Truckenmiller, except for where noted.

1. "Rise from the Ashes" – 2:59
2. "Get Up" – 3:34
3. "Take a Drink" – 2:43
4. "Let Me Go In" – 2:39
5. "Rush Together" – 3:32
6. "Maybe Misery" – 2:59
7. "I Lie Awake" – 3:10
8. "The Season" (Truckenmiller, Matt Kirby) – 3:01
9. "Time After Time" (Cyndi Lauper, Rob Hyman) – 3:07
10. "Both Ways" – 3:39

== Singles ==
- "Rise from the Ashes"
- "Time After Time"

== Personnel ==
- Butch Walker – Producer
- Matt Kirkwold – Producer
- James "Fluff" Harley - Engineer, Mixing
- Chris Lord-Alge – Mixer
- Kevin Truckenmiller – Vocals, Guitar, Fiddle
- Matt Kirby – Vocals, Guitar
- Justin Bonhiver – Guitar
- Droo Hastings – Bass
- Brandon Lanier – Drums
- Walter Powell - Drums
