= The Bedroom (Widener Collection) =

1658–1660 painting by Pieter de Hooch

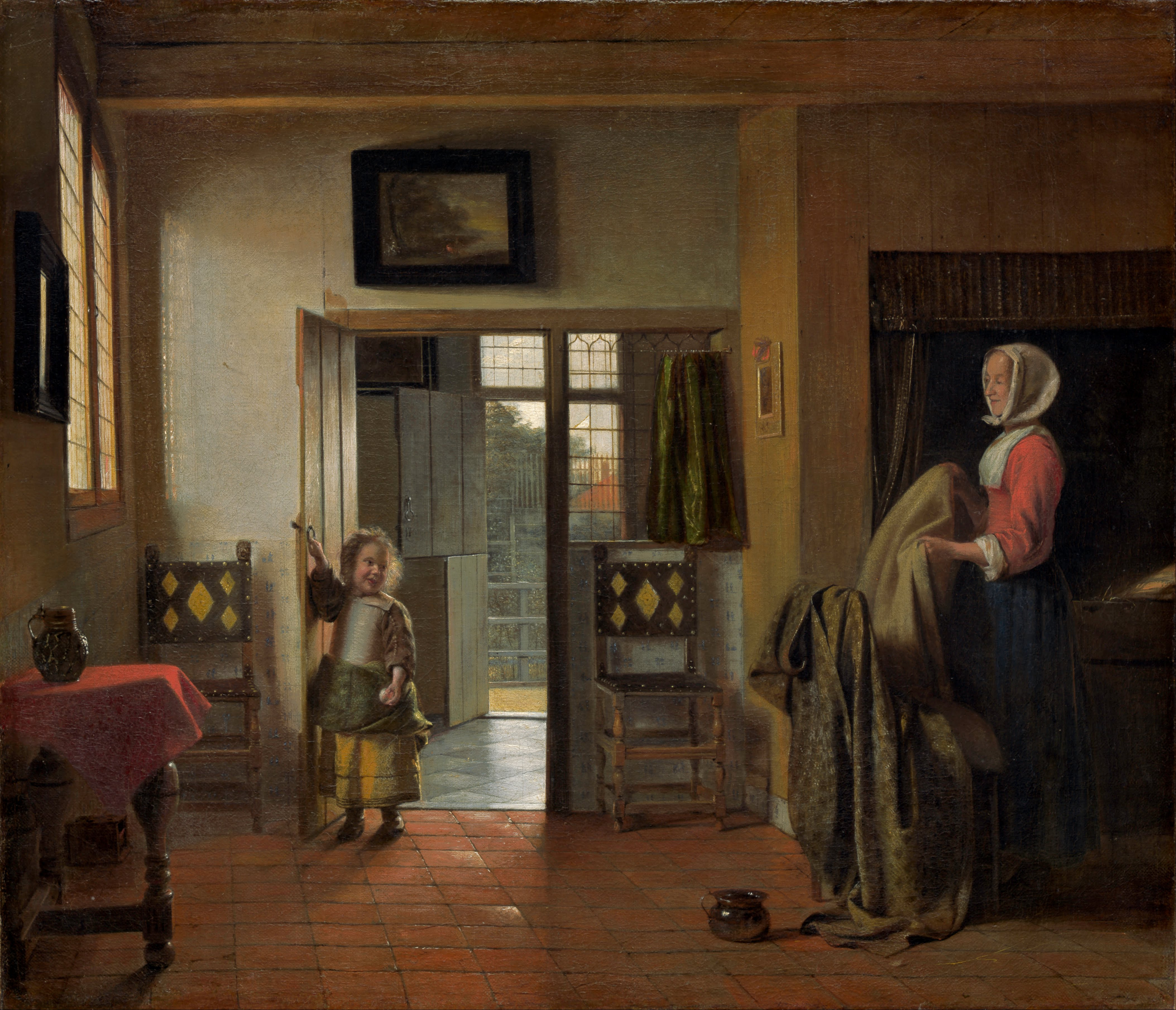
- Artist: Pieter de Hooch
- Year: 1658–1660
- Medium: Oil on canvas
- Dimensions: 51 cm × 60 cm (20 in × 24 in)
- Location: National Gallery of Art; Washington, D.C.

The Bedroom (1658–1660) is an oil-on-canvas painting by the Dutch painter Pieter de Hooch. It is an example of Dutch Golden Age painting and is part of the collection of the National Gallery of Art in Washington, D.C., United States.

The painting was documented in 1910 by Hofstede de Groot, who wrote:

78. THE BEDROOM. Sm. 29, 55. This picture is similar in

all respects to the picture at Karlsruhe (72), except that the little mirror hanging at the side of the bed has no ornament at the top and bottom. It has every sign of authenticity. Canvas, 20 inches by 23 inches. Mentioned by Waagen, ii. 71.

Sales:

- S. J. Stinstra, in Amsterdam, May 22, 1822, No. 86 (25 florins, De Vries).
- Lord Radstock, at Christie's, in London, 1826 (70 guineas); 1827 (bought in at 150).
- Said by Smith (in 1833) and by Waagen to be in the collection of Lord Stafford, but not mentioned in the book on this collection which is still at Bridgewater House.
- Sales. Amsterdam, April 24, 1838 (3311 florins, Brondgeest).
- E. P. Cremer, in Middelburg, May 17, 1847, No. 8. Field, London, 1856 (^43 : is.).
- C. Scarisbrick, in London, May 1861 (441, F. N.).
- Adrian Hope, in London, June 30, 1894, No. 32 (2257 : 10s., C. Wertheimer).
- In the 1898 catalogue of 300 paintings of the dealer Sedelmeyer of Paris, No. 70.

It is now in the collection of P. A. B. Widener, Philadelphia. Probably a second version of Mr. Widener's picture was included in the above-mentioned sales, for it is impossible that the picture was first in Holland, then in England, then in Holland again, and finally in England. This second version was not the picture at Karlsruhe, which, according to the director of that gallery, was in the possession of the Baden reigning house in the eighteenth century. Possibly it was an old copy which was in the hands of a London dealer about the year 1900. [Compare also the small picture in the Munro sale (86 and 84).]

This painting seems to have been a successful design for de Hooch as there are several variations on the subject in addition to the picture in Karlsruhe:

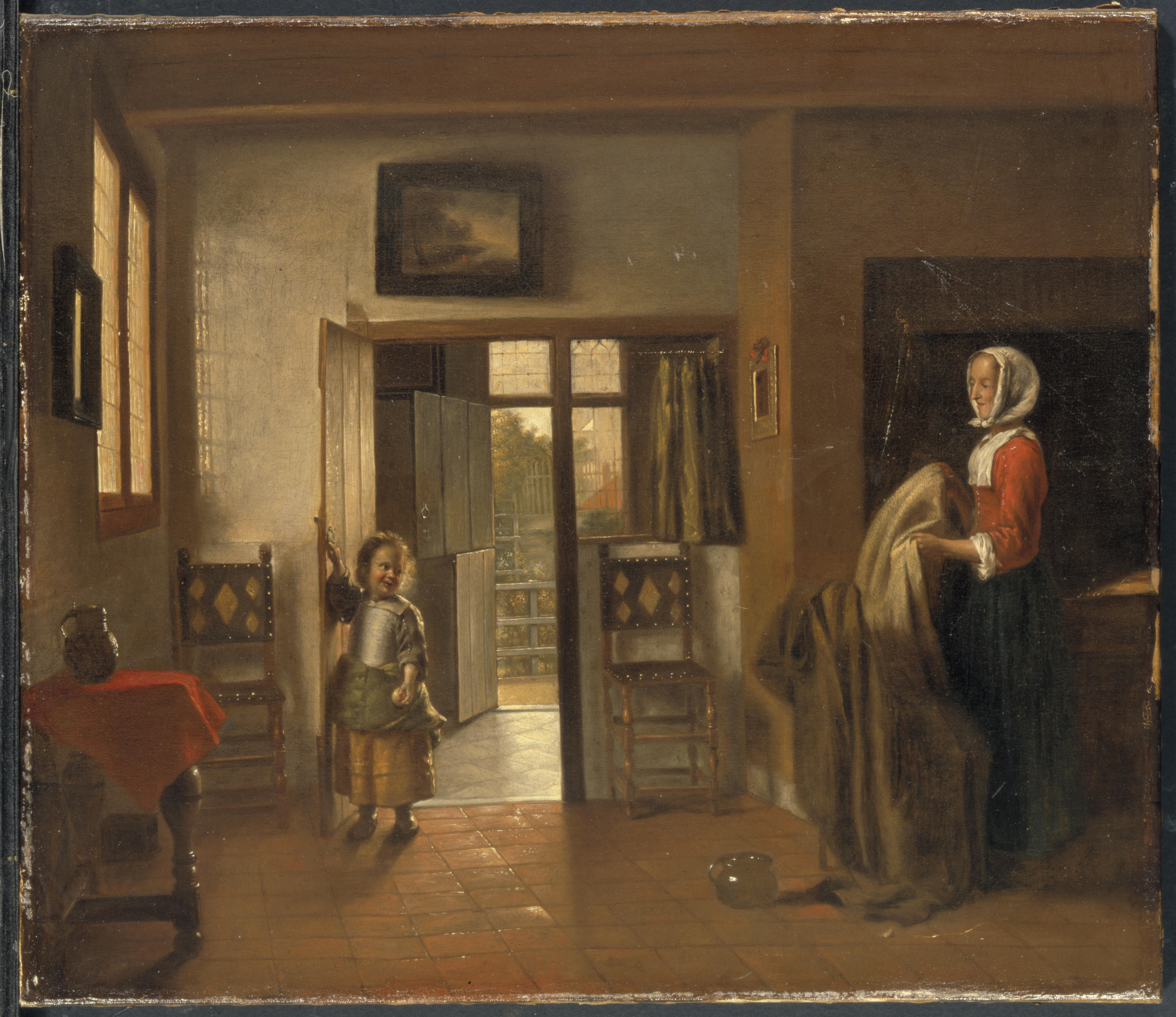
Copy of this painting

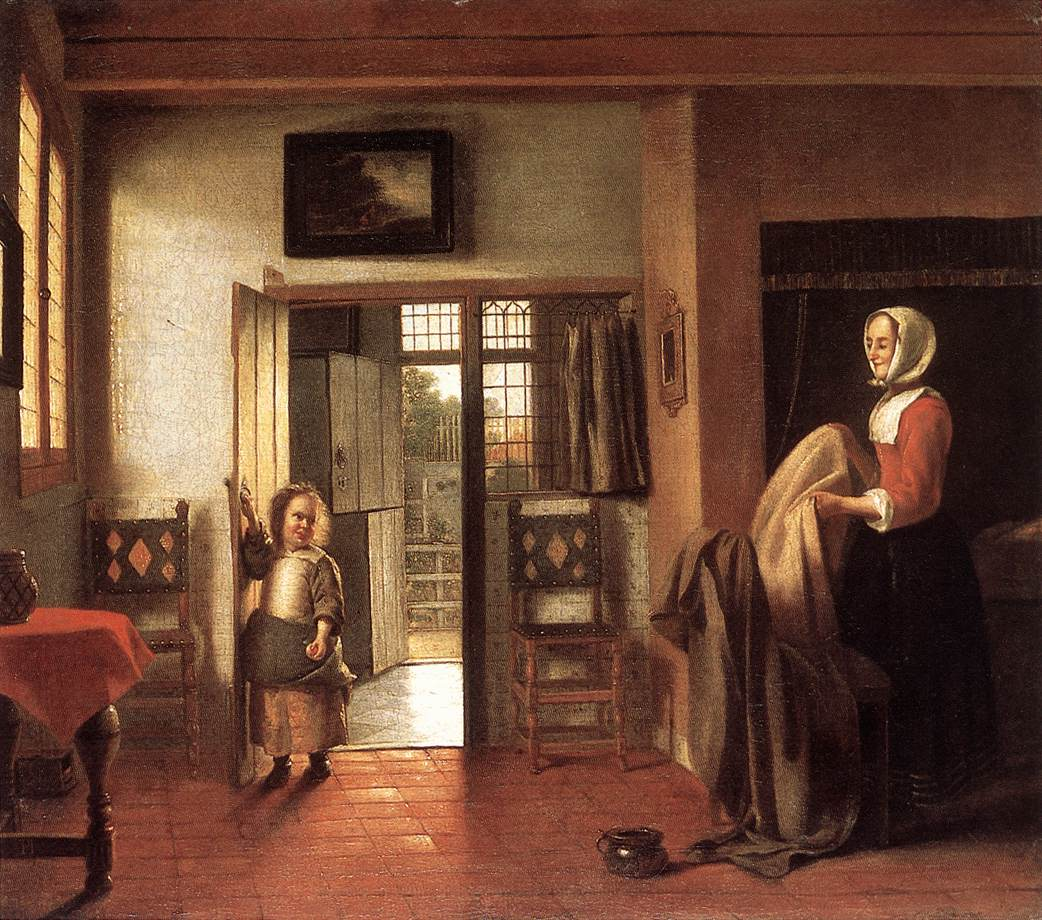
The Bedroom (Karlsruhe)

A Mother's Duty (Rijksmuseum)

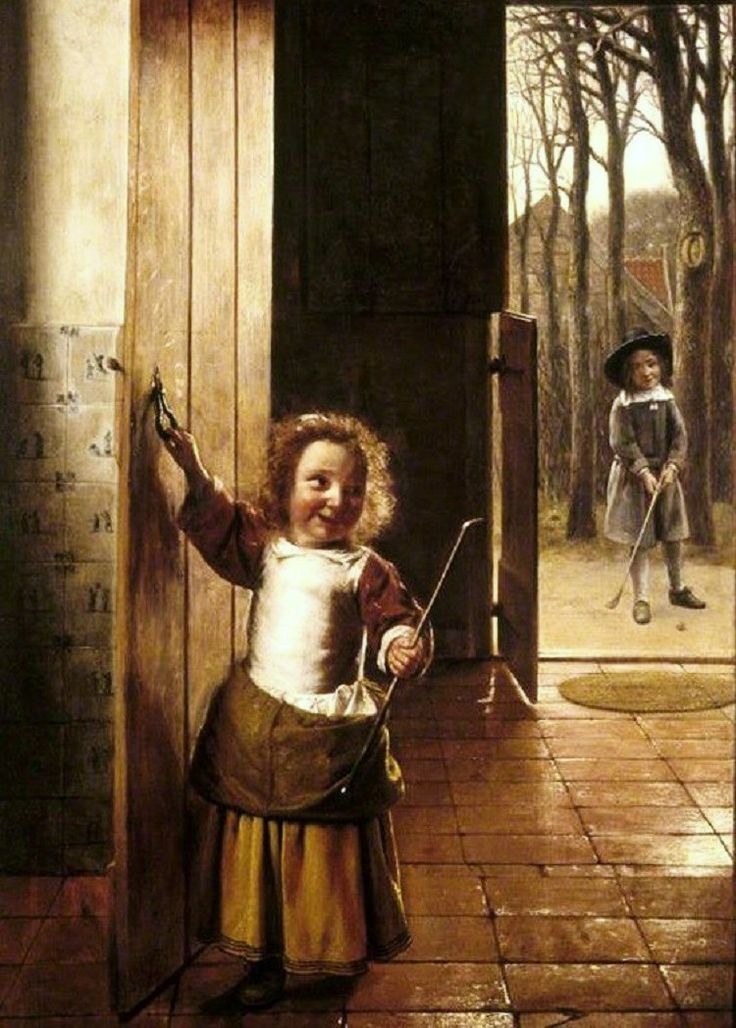
The Golf Players (Polesden Lacey, Surrey)

== See also ==
- List of paintings by Pieter de Hooch
