= Bedroom TV =

Concept music channel in which people could make their favorite songs by lip sync

Bedroom TV (or BTV for short) was a concept music channel in which people could make videos to their favourite songs by Lip Sync, slide shows or animations using models or cartoon style drawings. The channel launched in late July 2007 but was forced to close down in August 2008 due to running costs. The channel was on channel 376 in the music section on Sky Digital until July 2008 when it moved to channel 381, at the same time all the other music channels moved due to Sky Movies launching in high-definition. In August 2008 the channel ceased to broadcast and moved to the shopping section on channel 683 as Trondirect1. Following the end of the use of the channel EPG by Trondirect1 in January 2009 the channel name returned on Sky showing teleshopping on channel 962 in the adult section from 6 am to 9 am. this was in a holding position awaiting another client for use as the channel EPG was still owned by BedroomTV. Despite the channel having now gone off air, the website remained online until early 2012 running with people still making videos and adding them to the website.
