= The Reputation =

American indie rock band

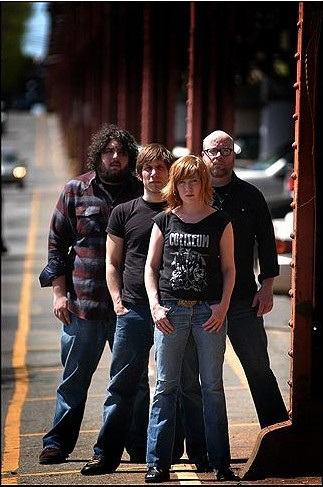
- The Reputation outside the 46th Street subway station in Philadelphia in 2005

Background information
- Origin: Chicago, Illinois, United States
- Genres: Indie rock
- Years active: 2001–2006
- Labels: Lookout! Records; Initial Records
- Members: Elizabeth Elmore; Sean Hulet; Greg Mytych; Steve Van Horn
- Past members: Scott Rosenquist; Ben Kane; Chad Romanski; Matt Espy; Joel Root
- Website: www.reputationmusic.com

The Reputation was an indie rock band from Chicago, Illinois. The band was fronted by former Sarge singer-songwriter Elizabeth Elmore, with other positions filled by various members.

The band, which formed while Elmore was attending law school, released two albums between the years of 2001 and 2006, both of which were met with generally positive reviews. The band toured extensively in the United States and Canada, as well as in the United Kingdom.

== History ==
Following the disbanding of her old band, Sarge, Elmore enrolled in law school at Northwestern University. She embarked on a series of solo tours between classes, but after growing tired of performing solo Elmore recruited ex-Sarge drummer Russ Horvath and ex-Chisel bassist and law school classmate Chris Norborg to tour with. The group toured together and recorded a five song demo, but after a while Horvath and Norborg were no longer able to tour due to schooling. Elmore recruited friend and ex-Moreno guitarist/singer Sean Hulet, ex-Moreno drummer Scott Rosenquist, and ex-Andiamo bassist Joel Root. The new group completed a tour of the East Coast.

Elmore requested a leave of absence from Northwestern Law School in 2001 to focus on the band. After ex-Nymb drummer Ben Kane replaced the unavailable Rosenquist, the group signed to Initial Records. Kane left the band, and former Sarge drummer Chad Romanski joined the group after several weeks of Elmore begging. The band completed a fall West Coast tour and began recording their debut album with Romanski. The band took on the name The Reputation at this time.

=== Self-titled debut ===
The Reputation, the band's self-titled debut album, was released in 2002 after the band spent much of the fall and winter of 2001 in the recording studio. The majority of the album was recorded in Chicago at Atlas, with the exception of a cover of Elvis Costello's song "Almost Blue," which was recorded with then-Wilco guitarist Jay Bennett on piano and production duties, as well as extra arrangements and recording on other tracks. Elmore, as she did with her work in Sarge, wrote all of the original songs and lyrics, and assisted with the production along with Matt Allison.

The album was well received critically. The Los Angeles Times gave the album 3.5 out of 4 stars, with reviewer Kevin Bronson saying that "[Elmore's] streaming anecdotes give the listener the feeling of walking right into the middle of life-altering events." The College Music Journal's Amy Wan called the album a "showcase for Elmore's powerfully biting lyrics and her passionate voice, dancing deftly between little-girl sweet and outright roar," and The Village Voice gave the album an A−, with famed music journalist Robert Christgau praising the debut, saying that "Elmore left a great band to go to law school. Now she leaves a great law school to start a better band."

Along with the positive feedback for the album, the band was able to secure its first permanent drummer in Matt Espy. The band would tour the United States and parts of Canada a number of times following the release of the album. Along with the performance agenda in 2003, Elmore balanced touring, songwriting for their next album, and a return to law school while the band suffered the loss of yet another drummer, as Espy was forced to leave after a tenure of nearly a year and a half for personal reasons.

=== To Force a Fate ===
The band settled on their second permanent drummer, Steve Van Horn, shortly after Espy left following their round of touring. At the same time, the band began negotiations with Lookout! Records to release their follow-up. After a marathon run of shows and songwriting toward the end of 2003, the band recorded their second album. The sessions were difficult, with 14-hour recording days being balanced with Elmore attempting to finish remaining law school papers, combined with weekend tour jaunts to the East Coast. The album was unique compared to other Elmore projects in that other members of the band assisted in the songwriting process.

To Force a Fate was ultimately released in April 2004 on Lookout! Records. The album received generally positive press, including favorable reviews in Spin Magazine, calling the album "a bang of power pop epiphany." Blender Magazine gave the album four stars, stating that "Elizabeth Elmore, a law-school graduate with boy trouble to match her student loans, writes songs that are as much legal briefs as diary entries." Entertainment Weekly called the album "muscular yet lush," and gave the album a B+. The album would eventually reach No. 58 on the CMJ charts.

=== Post-album touring ===
The band spent 2004 and 2005 touring the United States for over nine months, including opening slots for Ted Leo and the Pharmacists, The Killers, Modest Mouse, Death Cab for Cutie, and the Donnas. The band's performance at South by Southwest in particular was covered positively in Entertainment Weekly.

2005 took the band overseas to tour the United Kingdom for the first time, as well as two separate two-month United States tours. In June 2005, bassist Joel Root left the band for personal reasons. They completed their summer tour with Stereo South bassist Greg Mytych, and planned to record a new album in 2006, but came to a halt due to mitigating factors, including the issues with Lookout! Records. In September 2005, the band performed at North East Sticks Together. Elmore, in November 2006, posted a message to the band's official mailing list noting that the band had dissolved and no further plans had been announced. Drummer Steve Van Horn has joined former Chicagoan and current Austin, TX based singer-songwriter Che Arthur's touring band.

== Musical and lyrical style ==
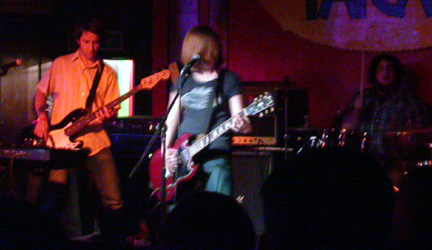
The Reputation performing at Mary Jane's in 2005

The Reputation's music is influenced by that of Elmore's previous band, Sarge. The band also drew comparisons to the Fastbacks, Liz Phair, Neil Young, and Elvis Costello, the last of which the band covered with their version of the song "Almost Blue". Elmore drew influence from a wide variety of music, including post-hardcore, alternative country, 1970s singer-songwriters, indie rock, classical music, country music, bluegrass, and 1980s pop music. While the band's first album used conventional punk rock instruments, To Force a Fate included more diverse instruments such as piano, strings, and horns. According to a review in Allmusic, To Force a Fate's contains "thoughtful songwriting and dashes of indie rock anthemics".

The subjects of the band's songs are frequently related to Elmore's relationships. She stated "as far as I can tell, I am too brutally honest and opinionated for most people."

== Members ==
The Reputation's lineup changed numerous times during the band's existence.

Final members

- Elizabeth Elmore – vocals and guitar
- Sean Hulet – guitar and vocals
- Greg Mytych – bass guitar
- Steve Van Horn – drums

Former members

- Matt Espy – drummer
- Ben Kane – touring drummer
- Chad Romanski – recording drummer on The Reputation
- Joel Root – bass guitar
- Scott Rosenquist – touring drummer

== Releases ==
Albums

- The Reputation (2002)
- To Force a Fate (2004)

Compilations

| Year | Song | Compilation | Notes |
|---|---|---|---|
| 2002 | "For the Win" (Demo) | Fields and Streams | Re-recorded version appears on The Reputation |
| 2002 | "For What It's Worth" | Don't Know When I'll Be Back Again: A Compilation Benefiting American Veterans of the Vietnam War | |
| 2002 | "Some Senseless Day" | OIL | Later appeared on Force a Fate |
| 2005 | "Face It" | That's My Bag | Also appeared on Force a Fate |
