= Box-bed =

Type of enclosed bed

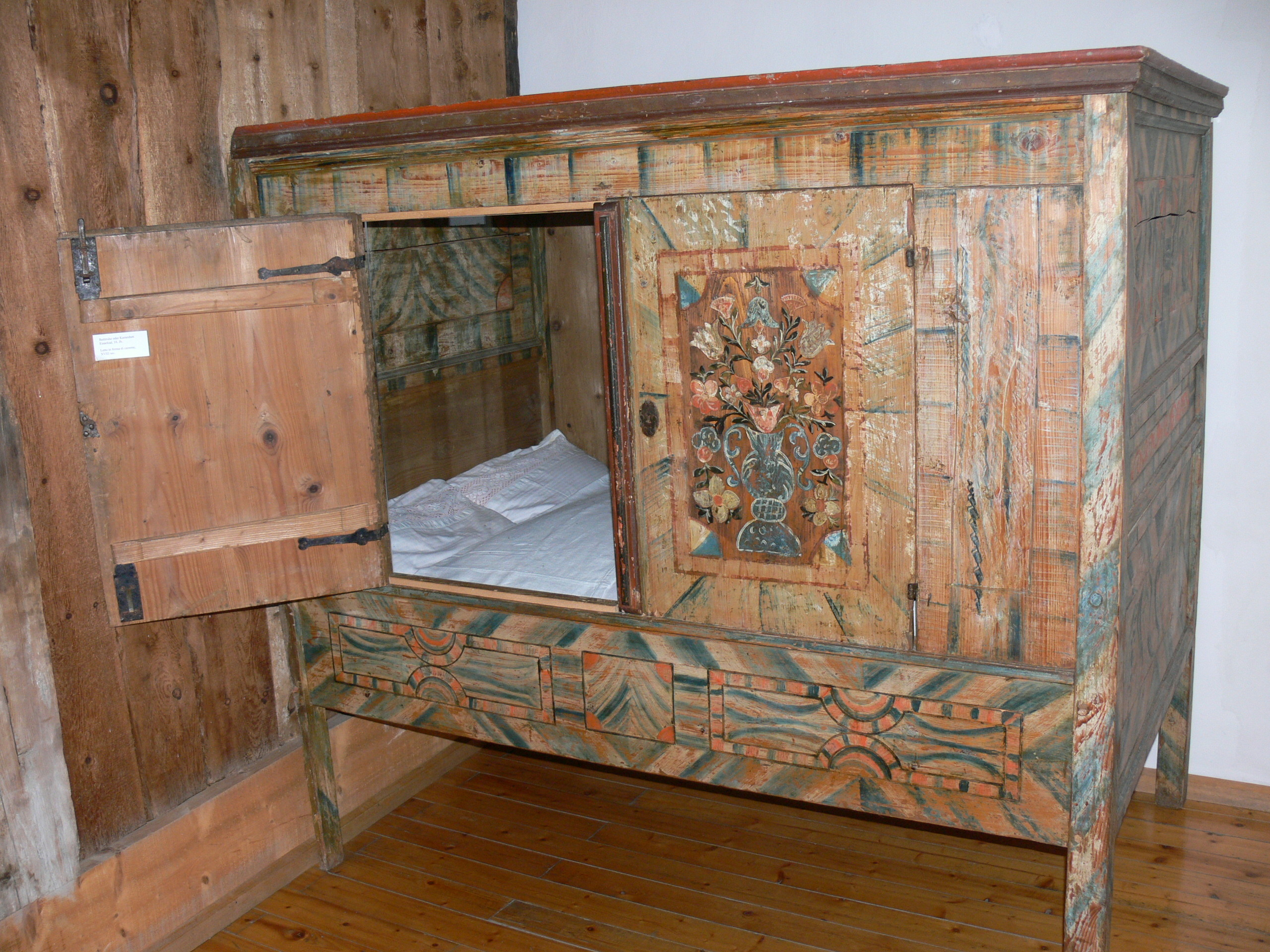
Box-bed in Austria

A small box-bed (also known as a closed bed, close bed, or enclosed bed; less commonly, shut-bed) is an enclosed bed made to look like a cupboard, half-opened or not. The form originates in western European late medieval furniture.

The box-bed is closed on all sides by panels of wood. One enters it by moving curtains, opening a hinged door or sliding doors on one or two slides. The bed is placed on short legs to prevent moisture intrusion and rot when used on a dirt floor.

In front of the box-bed is often a large oaken chest, the same length as the bed. This was always the 'seat of honour,' and served also as a step for climbing into the bed. It was also used to store clothing, underwear and bedding the rest of the time.

== The closed-bed in Brittany ==
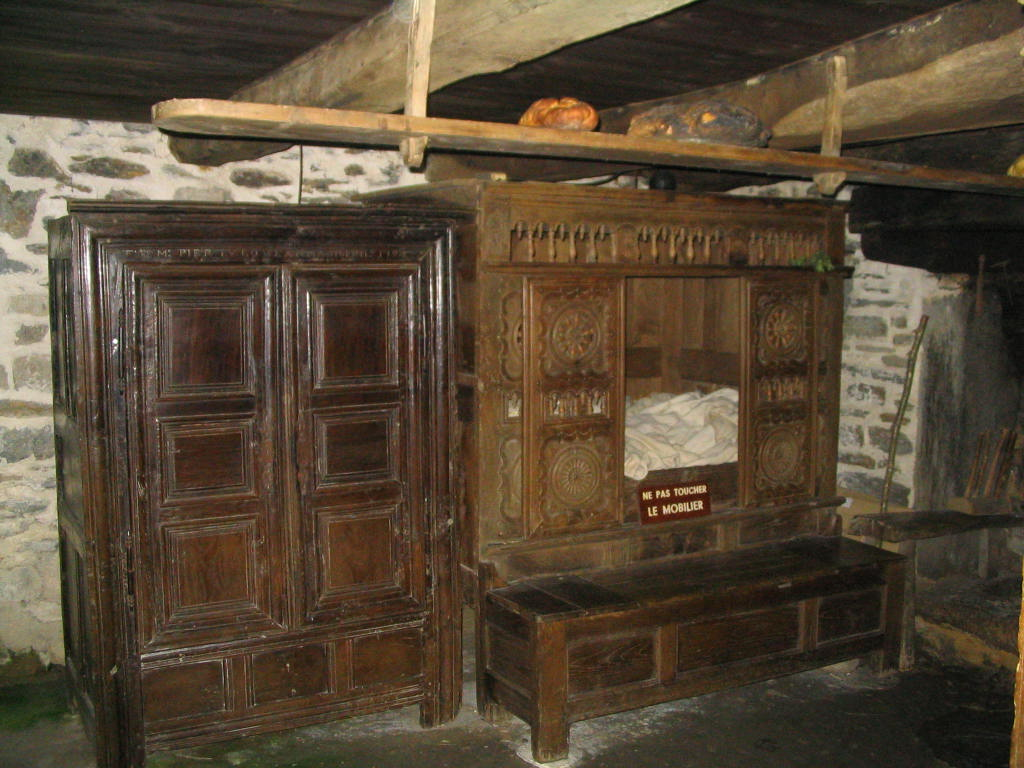
Closed bed in Finistère (France)

In Brittany, the closed-bed (French: lit-clos) (Breton: gwele-kloz) is a traditional furnishing. In homes with only one room, the box-bed allowed some privacy and helped keep people warm during winter. It was the main furniture of rural houses in Brittany until the 20th century. Often carved and decorated, it was the pride of its owners.

Some closed-beds were built one above the other in a double-decker, two-story arrangement. In these cases, young people would sleep in the top area.

Closed-beds were 1.60 to 1.70 m length, long enough for people of that region who were rather small.

Box-beds were also used to protect people of the home from the domestic animals (pigs, hens) living in the house. In Breton culture, the box-bed was also believed to offer protection against wolves.

Similar types of enclosed bed furniture was once also found in western Britain; Devon, Cornwall, Wales, and particularly in Gower.

Later box-beds fell out of fashion and because they were expensive to make, box-beds were gradually abandoned in the 19th and 20th centuries. Fine pieces were put in museums (Lampaul-Guimiliau, Nantes, Quimper, Rennes, St-Brieuc), while most of them were converted into bookshelves, dressers or TV cabinets. In the 21st century, rental companies offer nights in authentic box-beds. The contemporary Breton designers Erwan and Ronan Bouroullec have reinterpreted the form with their lit-clos, 2000 for Galerie kreo.

== The closet-bed in the Netherlands ==
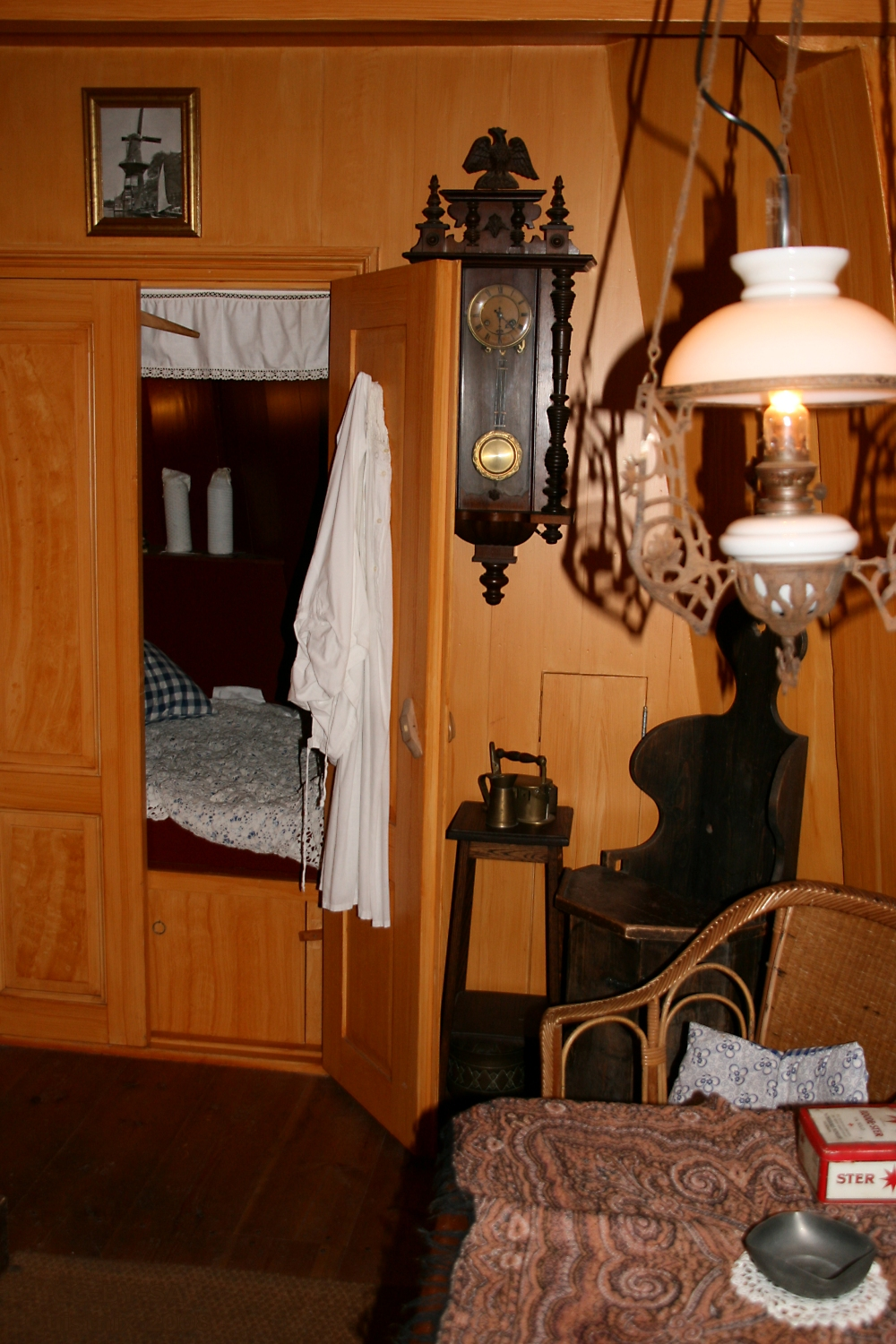
A Dutch bedstede

In the Netherlands the closet-bed, or bedstede, was in common use into the 19th century, particularly in farmhouses in the countryside. Closet-beds were closed off with a door or a curtain.

One of the advantages of the closet-bed was that it could be built into the living room and closed off during the day, making a separate bedroom unnecessary. The other main advantage was that, during the winter, the small area of the closet-bed would be warmed by body heat. This meant the stove would not need to be kept stoked at night. The door would not be shut completely, but left open a bit.

During the 16th and 17th century, closet-beds were much smaller. Lying down was associated with death, and therefore sleeping was done in a half-upright position. These closet-beds held two people, and beneath them were often drawers "rolkoetsen" that pulled out and provided beds for the children.

A Mother's Duty by Pieter de Hooch shows a woman delousing her child's hair in front of a raised box bed that can be climbed into from the chest below it.

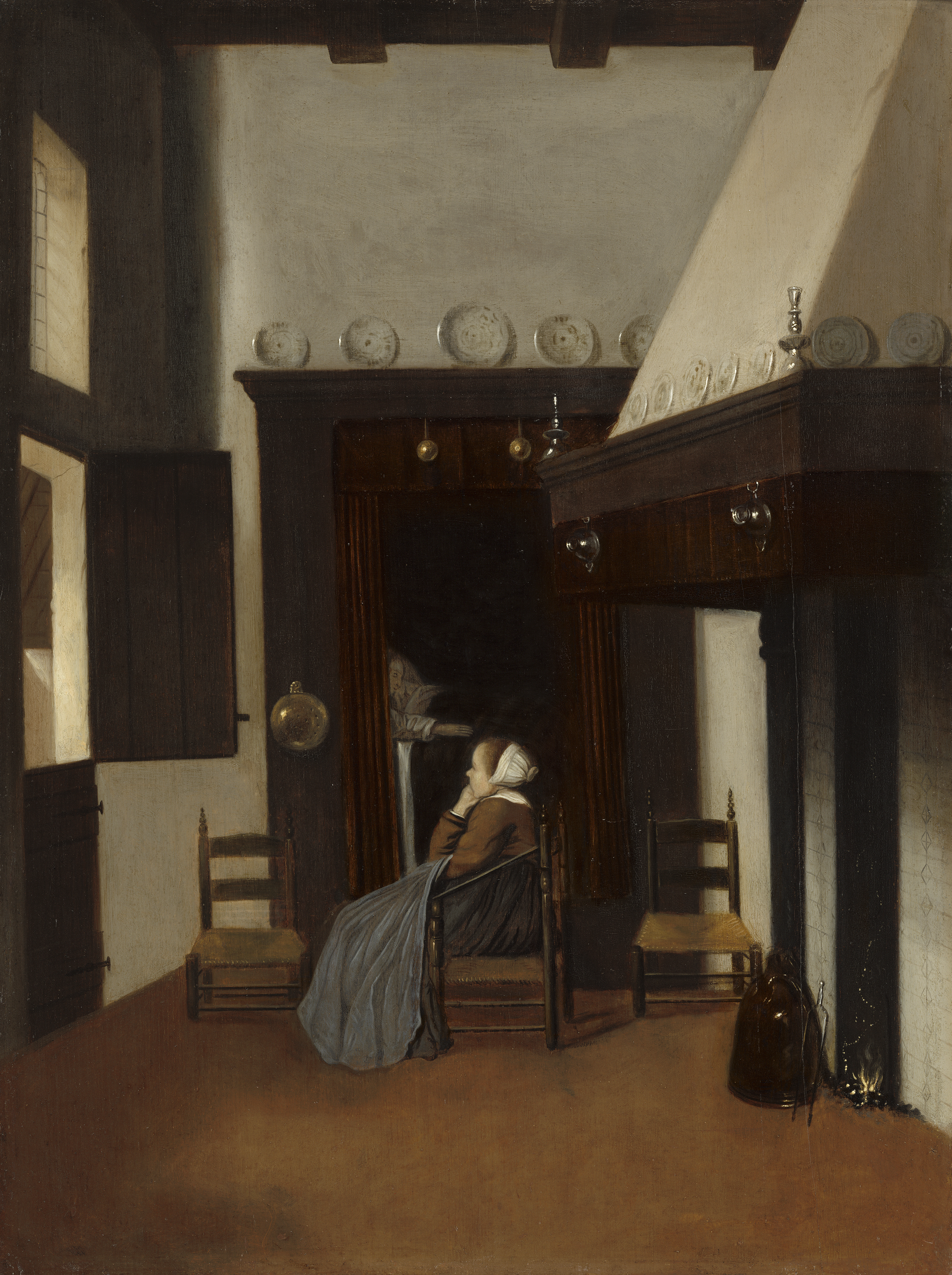
Young Woman in an Interior by Jacob Vrel shows an older woman resting or sleeping in a box bed with the titular companion sitting beside her.
