= The Bedroom (Karlsruhe) =

1658–1660 painting by Pieter de Hooch

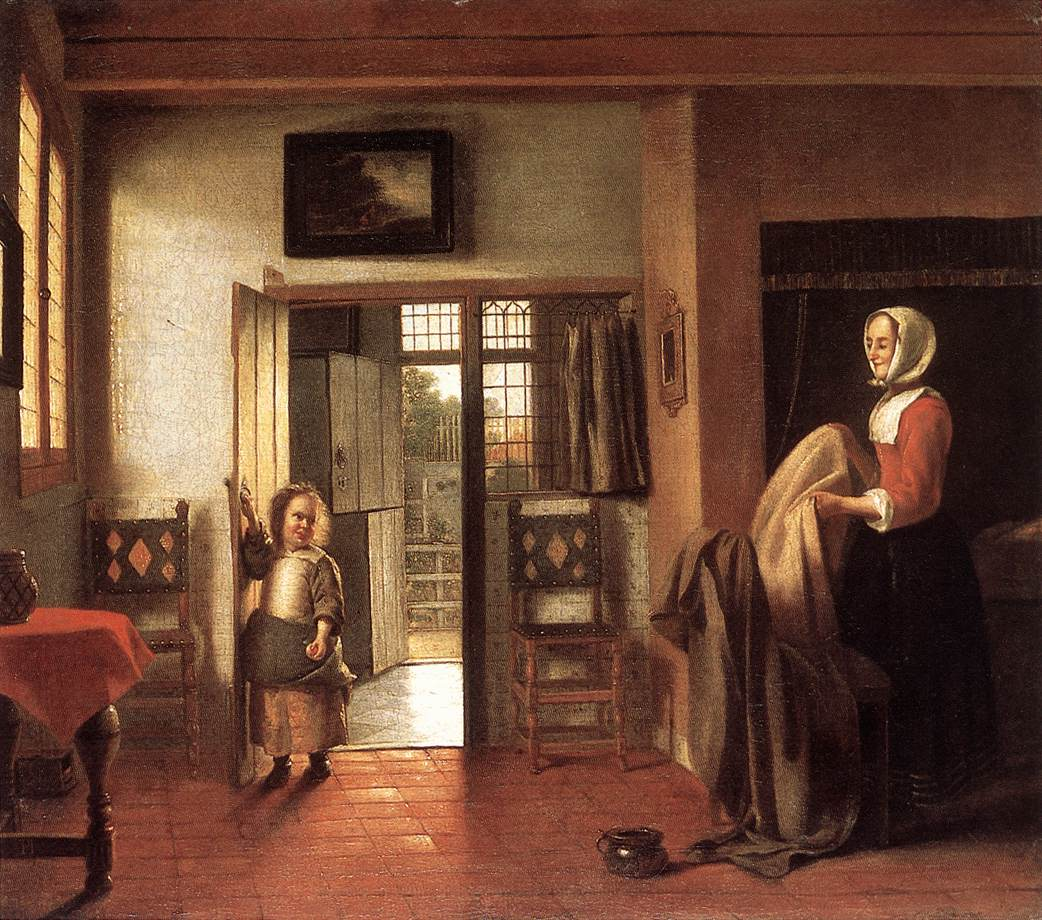
- Artist: Pieter de Hooch
- Year: 1658–1660
- Medium: Oil on canvas
- Dimensions: 50.8 cm × 61 cm (20.0 in × 24 in)
- Location: Staatliche Kunsthalle Karlsruhe; Karlsruhe

The Bedroom (1658–1660) is an oil-on-canvas painting by the Dutch painter Pieter de Hooch. It is an example of Dutch Golden Age painting and is part of the collection of the Staatliche Kunsthalle Karlsruhe in Germany.

The painting was documented by Hofstede de Groot in 1910, who wrote:

72. THE BEDROOM. To the right a young woman is making a bed. She has taken the clothes from a bed enclosed in a wooden partition, and has laid them over a chair. She stands in profile to the left, and smiles at her little girl, who stands in the open doorway to the left with an apple in her left hand. The child's figure is illumined from a high window on the left and from a door in the background. This door leads from a little ante-room into the open air, where walls and garden hedges are visible. In the left foreground is a table with a jug; behind it is a chair. Signed to the left on the table-leg with a monogram of the letters P and H (apparently genuine); canvas, 19 1/2 inches by 25 inches. Mentioned by Parthey, 1863 (i. 622, 3). According to a letter from K. Koelitz, the picture belonged to the reigning house of Baden in the eighteenth century. Now in the Grand Ducal Picture Gallery at Karlsruhe, No. 259 in the 1894 catalogue.

This painting seems to have been a successful design for De Hooch as there are several variations on the subject and another version of this painting in Washington, D.C.

== Gallery ==
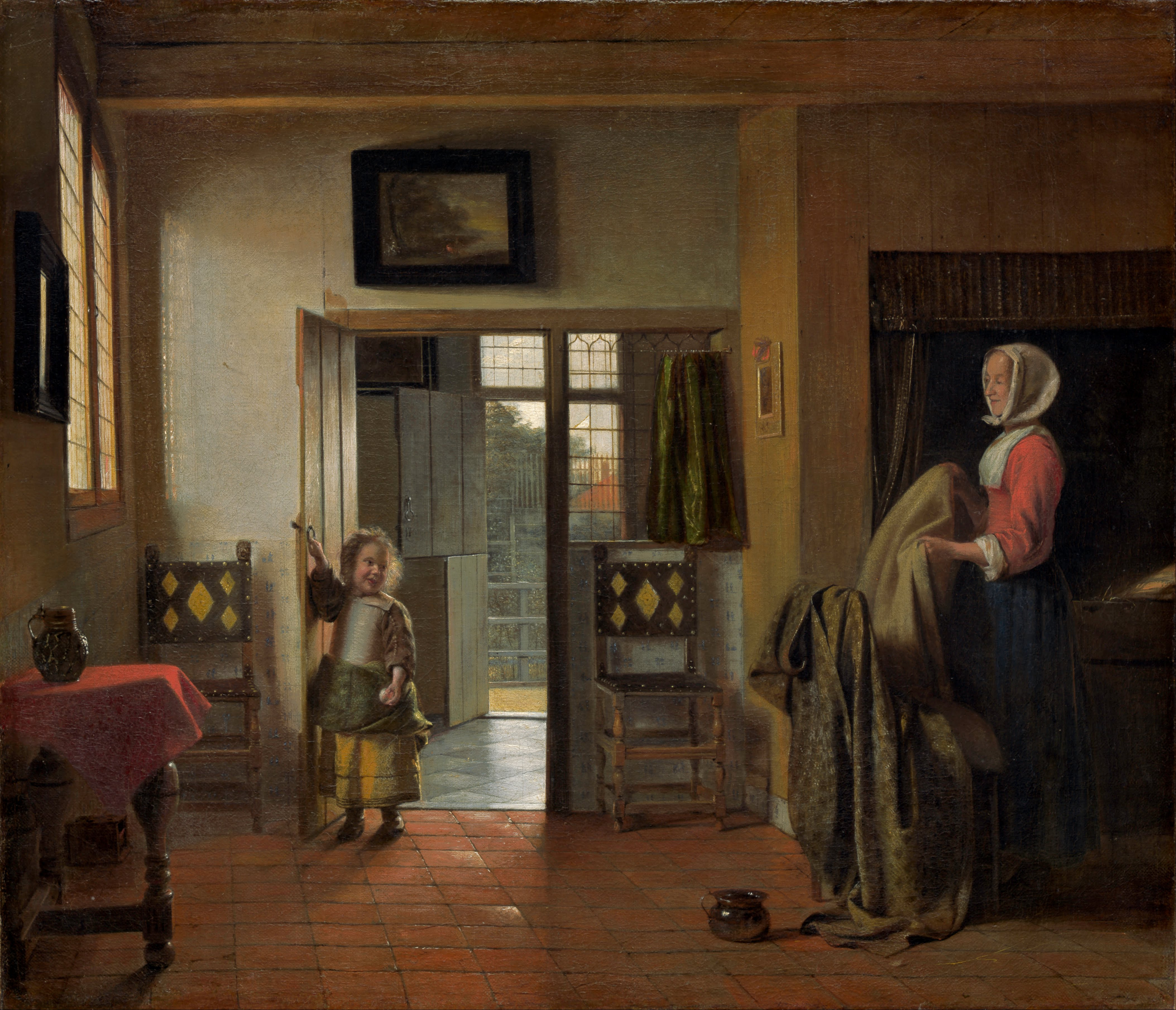
The Bedroom (National Gallery of Art)

A Mother's Duty (Rijksmuseum)

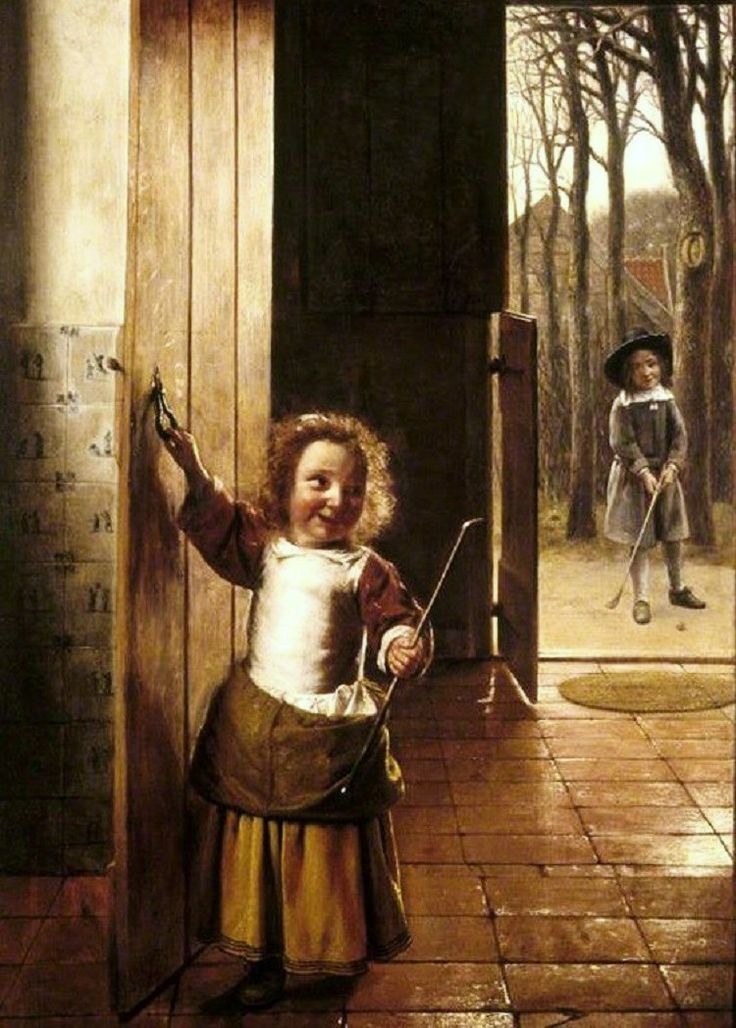
The Golf Players (Polesden Lacey, Surrey)

== See also ==
- List of paintings by Pieter de Hooch
