= Charcoal (album) =

Studio album by Sarge
- Released: 1996
- Genre: indie rock
- Label: Mud Records, Parasol Records

Sarge chronology
Charcoal (1996)	The Glass Intact (1998)

Professional ratings
Review scores
Source	Rating
Allmusic	link

Charcoal is the debut album by Champaign, Illinois, indie rock band Sarge. It was released in 1996 on Mud Records, and featured the single "Dear Josie, Love Robyn".

== Track listing ==
1. "Smoke"
2. "Backlash"
3. "Dear Josie, Love Robyn"
4. "Chicago"
5. "Crush"
6. "Bedroom"
7. "I Don't"
8. "Another Gear Uncaught"
9. "The Last Boy"
