= Elizabeth Elmore =

American singer-songwriter

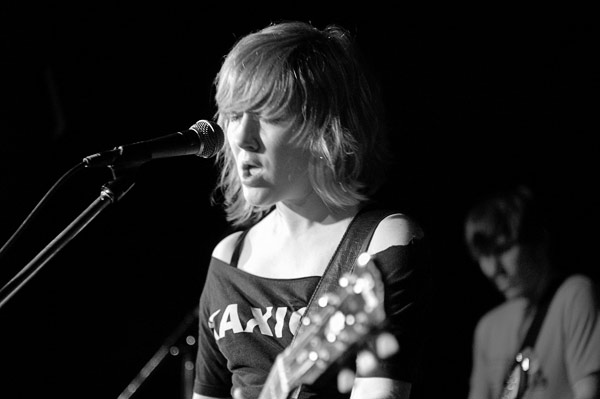
- Elizabeth Elmore, playing with The Reputation

Background information
- Born: April 30, 1976 (age 50)
- Origin: Chicago, Illinois, U.S.
- Genres: Rock, Indie
- Occupations: Singer-songwriter, Lawyer

Elizabeth Elmore (born April 30, 1976) is an American singer-songwriter and lawyer who has worked with the rock bands The Reputation and Sarge.

== Career and education ==
Elmore formed Sarge in the Chicago area in 1996, and the band broke up in 1999. The Chicago Tribune wrote that Elmore "was in total command" of performing with Sarge. The Tallahassee Democrat wrote that her song-writing helped keep Sarge "a cut above the usual indie offerings."

Elmore had a short solo stint, during which she recorded a self-titled split EP with Bob Nanna of Braid featuring her song "You Blink."

In 2001, Elmore would form The Reputation, a band she played with until 2006. In 2002, The Reputation released a self-titled album.

Elmore is also a lawyer, having received a J.D. degree from Northwestern University. She enrolled in law school around 1999, which is one of the reasons Sarge disbanded. Elmore was admitted to the Illinois Bar around 2004.

== Discography ==
Elmore has been featured on a number of albums, singles, and compilations.

=== Solo release ===
- Bob Nanna/Elizabeth Elmore EP (CD/7") – Troubleman Unlimited – 2001

=== Compilations ===
- Christmas Singles (CD) – Parasol Records – 2000 (featuring a solo version of "White Christmas")

=== Selected guest vocals ===
- Very Secretary – Best Possible Souvenir on the song "Composure."
- The City on Film – The My Pal God Holiday Album on the song "Fairytale of New York."
- The Hold Steady – Boys and Girls in America on the song "Chillout Tent."
- Hushdrops – Volume One on the songs "Emily", "It's Alright" and "Here She Comes."
- The Red Hot Valentines – Red Hot Valentines/Retro Morning on the song "Better Than Last Time."
