= Sarge (band) =

American indie rock band

- Origin: Champaign, Illinois, U.S.
- Genres: Indie rock
- Years active: 1996–2000
- Label: Mud Records
- Past members: Elizabeth Elmore; Rachel Switzky; Chad Romanski; Sue Roth; Russ Horvath

Sarge was an indie rock band from Champaign, Illinois, in the United States. They released three albums on Mud Records.

== About ==
The band Sarge was formed in Champaign, Illinois by singer-songwriter Elizabeth Elmore and bassist Rachel Switzky. They later recruited a drummer, Chad Romanski. A second guitarist, Pat Cramer, volunteered to work for the band later. The band's first gig was at the Blind Pig in January 1996.

The band was considered "punk rock" and called "thoroughly solid" by CMJ New Music Monthly. In 1999, the Chicago Tribune called the band a "well-honed pop group." The band broke up in 1999, when Elmore returned to law school.

== Discography ==
Sarge released albums on Mud Records, as well as released a number of singles.

Albums

- Charcoal (CD/LP) – Mud Records (1996)
- The Glass Intact (CD/LP) – Mud Records (1998)
- Distant (CD) – Mud Records (2000)

Singles

- "Dear Josie, Love Robyn"/"The Last Boy" (7") – Mud Records (1996)
- "Stall"/"Time After Time" (7") – Mud Records (1997)
