= Devil among the tailors (disambiguation) =

Devil among the tailors (disambiguation) or De'il amang the tailors (scots) may refer to:

- A Scottish traditional dance
- The De'il amang the tailors a Scottish fiddle tune, a reel played for the dance of the same name and also for the Eightsome Reel.
- A pub skittles game devil among the tailors
- A track on In/Casino/Out, the second full-length LP by American post-hardcore band "At the Drive-In"
- Devil-among-the-Tailors, a race horse who finished third in the Newmarket Sweepstakes in 1842
- A type of firework .
