= Niedernberg =

- Municipality
- Coat of arms

- Location of Niedernberg within Miltenberg district
- Interactive map of Niedernberg
- Location within Germany Location within Bavaria
- Coordinates: 49°55′N 9°8′E
- Country: Germany
- State: Bavaria
- Admin. region: Unterfranken
- District: Miltenberg

Government
  - Mayor (2024–30): Ralf Sendelbach (FW)

Area
  - Total: 15.6 km^{2} (6.0 sq mi)
- Elevation: 117 m (384 ft)

Population (2025-12-31)
  - Total: 4,756
  - Density: 305/km^{2} (790/sq mi)
- Time zone: UTC+01:00 (CET)
  - Summer (DST): UTC+02:00 (CEST)
- Postal codes: 63843
- Dialling codes: 06028
- Vehicle registration: MIL
- Website: www.niedernberg.de

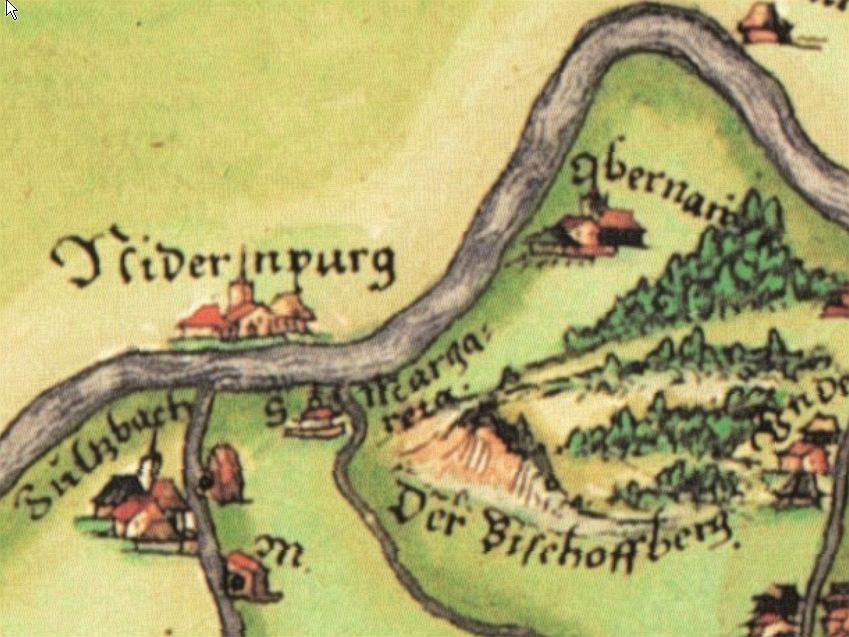
Niedernberg on a map from 1562

Niedernberg (German pronunciation: [ˈniːdɐnbɛʁk]) is a municipality in the Miltenberg district in the Regierungsbezirk of Lower Franconia (Unterfranken) in Bavaria, Germany.

== Geography ==
=== Location ===
Niedernberg is just under 10 km from Aschaffenburg to the north, which itself lies some 50 km southeast of Frankfurt am Main. Niedernberg is the Miltenberg district's northernmost municipality and is found right on the Main’s left bank. In both the east and the west, it is hilly.

=== Geology ===
Distinguishing the natural areas is the gradual downward slope of the eastern part of the municipal area from the west to the east. Niedernberg belongs to the Lower Main Plain (Untermainebene) and to the peripheral mountain zone of the Odenwald. The soil composition is what one would expect from this: throughout the even areas it is overwhelmingly sands and loamy layers. In the west are also found layers of loam at the surface, although these quickly yield to bunter.

Particularly as of the mid 20th century, there was an extensive gravel quarrying operation.

=== Natural events ===
Owing to its geographical location, Niedernberg has since yore had to deal repeatedly with wintertime floods in which, in particular, land near the Main has been involved. Since this especially great danger from rising floods came about from icejams, in 1559, for protection, a cutwater was built at the southeast end of the fortifications, which, however, did not work as had been hoped.

The highest ever flood reached Niedernberg in February 1784 during spring runoff as the Main flowed almost 10 m higher than normal through the valley. The flood tore away whole ships, huts and stables, sometimes along with the animals in them.

=== Municipal area’s extent ===
The municipal area stretches off mainly to the west, as in the north it is bounded by the water protection area (Wasserschutzgebiet), in the east by the Main and in the south by the lake plateau. Even its westward stretch, though, it is limited by Bundesstraße 469.

=== Constituent communities ===
Constituent communities

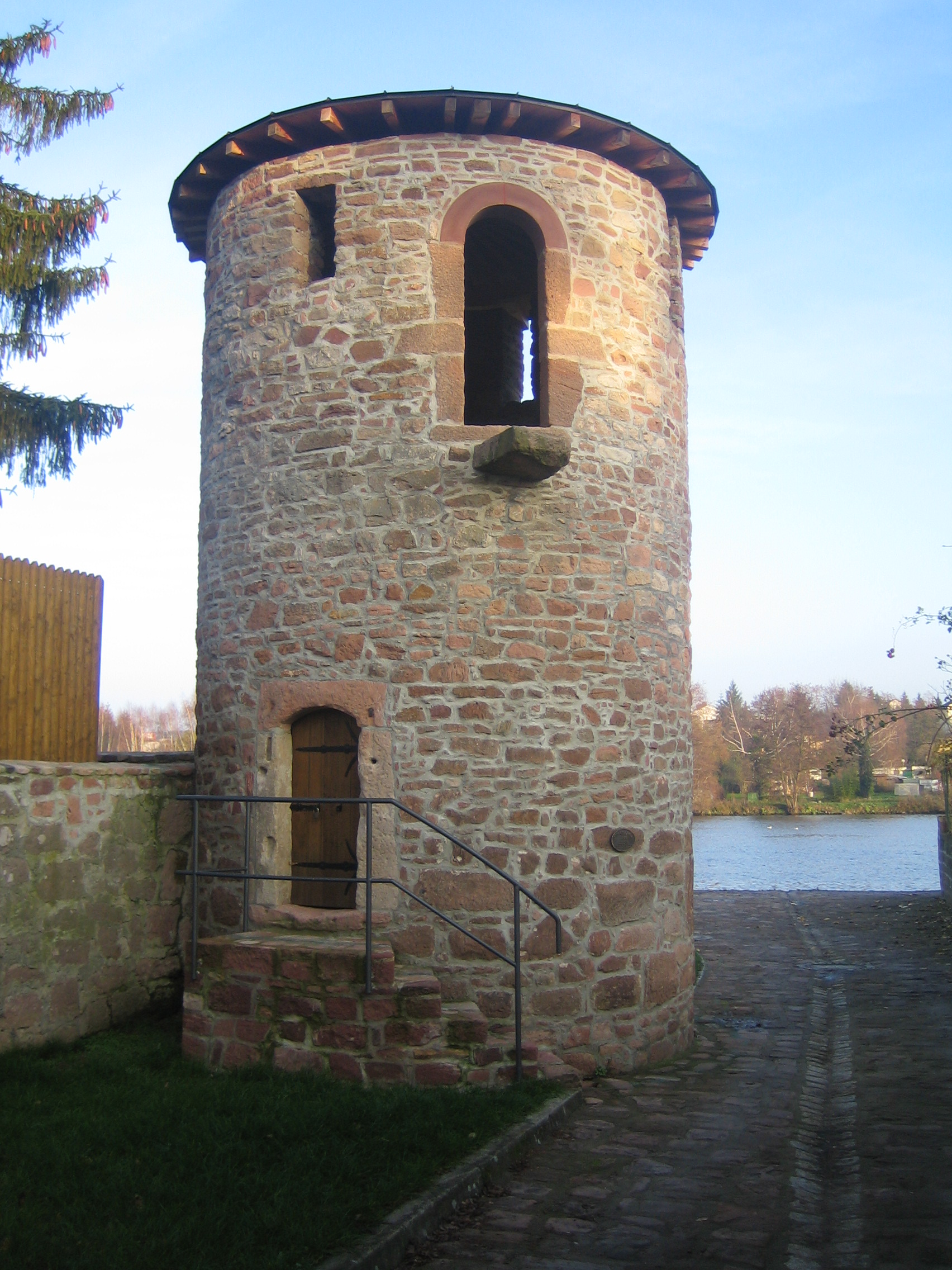
The Turm am Main, restored in 2006

The municipality is subdivided into four parts.

In the Ortskern, or municipal core, many old, and sometimes lovingly restored timber-frame houses are to be found. Moreover, this part of the municipality also contains the Catholic church, Saint Cyriacus’s, the Town Hall, two banks, a 15th-century fortification renovated in 2004, the Hauptschule and the Saint Cyriacus kindergarten.

The nördliche Neubaugebiet (“Northern New Building Area”) offers many Niedernberg dwellers a place for living and playing. North of the New Building Area are found the graveyard, the railway station and the sewage treatment plant.

In the so-called Gebiet Tafel are found the Tafel commercial area, the Tafeläcker New Building Area, which at this time is being built in four sections, and the watertower. Furthermore, the primary school is also here, as are the second kindergarten (Sonnenschein) and the Niedernberg Musical Corps's clubhouse, the so-called “Musicum”.

The Seengebiet (“Lake Area”) stretches south of the Hans-Herrmann-Halle, a multipurpose hall named after a former mayor. Here are the Seehotel, the HonischBeach – a bathing beach officially opened in 2005 – and a building area for holiday dwellings. Furthermore, there are three lakes adding to the area's makeup: the Silbersee (“Silver Lake”), the former surfing lake and the angling lake.

=== Climate ===
With a yearly mean temperature of more than 9 °C, Niedernberg belongs to one of Germany's warmest regions. It is favoured by the sheltering afforded by the Spessart and Odenwald wooded ranges.

== History ==
The oldest finds that indicate human habitation in Niedernberg's municipal area come from the New Stone Age. Far-reaching changes in the landscape came along with Roman rule about the time of the onset of the Christian Era: In the first century, the Roman Empire reached all the way to the Main. To secure their Imperial border, Roman troops built castra at strategic spots.

Niedernberg's beginnings go back to one such castrum, built between 83 and 150, at the so-called “Wet Limes”, which stood as the Empire's eastern border. The castrum, which measured 144 by 135 m, was built facing the east, towards the Main. Although the castrum was later overbuilt, the way the core of the community is laid out still goes back to the street layout in the castrum; Hauptstraße (“Main Street”) and Kirchgasse (“Church Lane”) correspond with streets in the Roman camp. Niedernberg was the post of a 300-strong cohort, Cohors I Ligurum et Hispanorum, which drew its recruits from northern Italy and Spain.

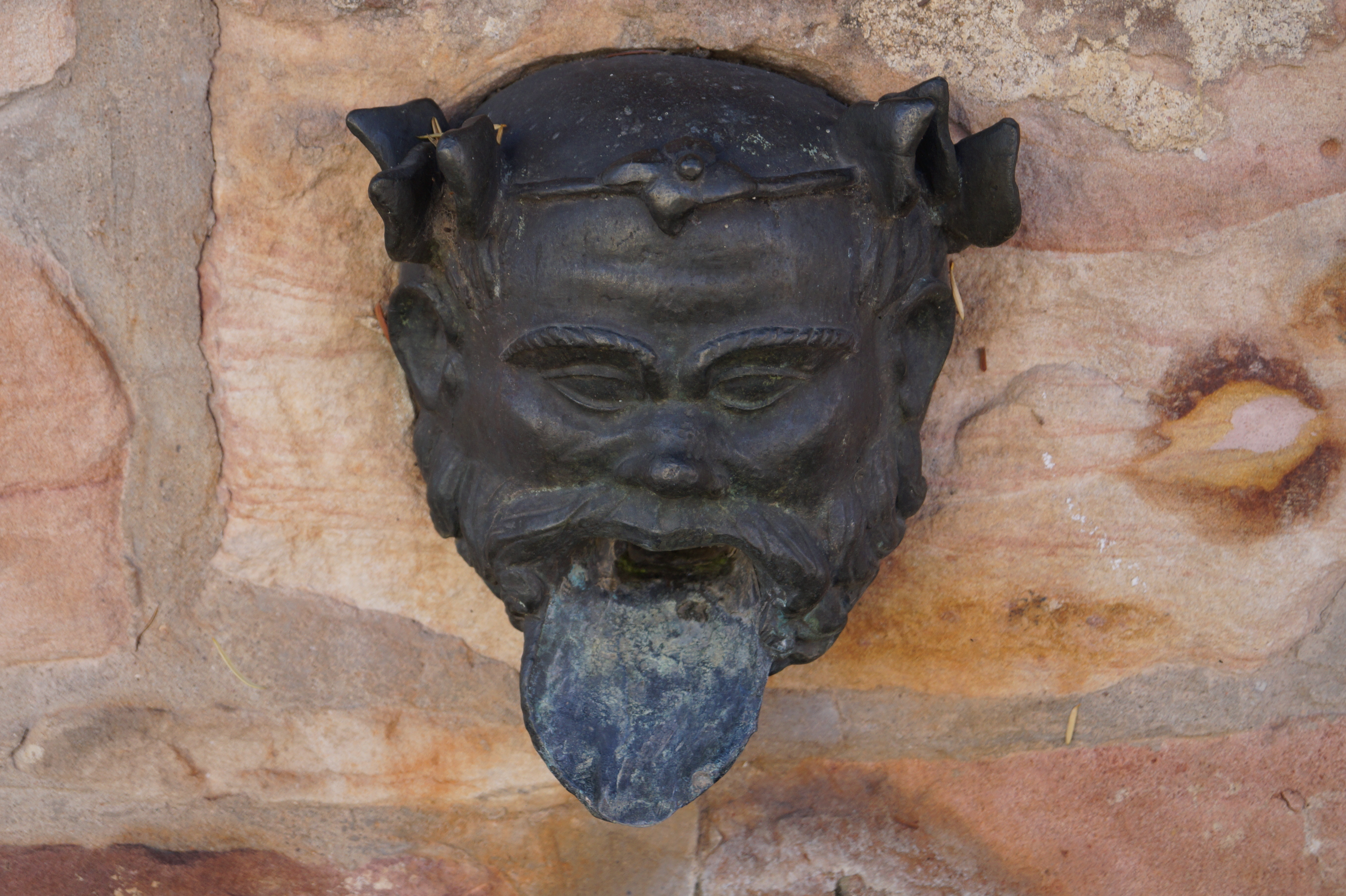
Roman fountain mask (replica)

Interesting finds such as the “Marcellus Stone” or a burying ground discovered in 1963 have yielded information about the lives of the Romans stationed in Niedernberg. In 1964, during building work on Hauptstraße, a bronze fountain mask was unearthed, today the only original such thing north of the Alps. This mask is today the showpiece of the Stiftsmuseum in Aschaffenburg, and at Roman exhibitions is found on loan among the very rarest exhibits.

In 1095, Niedernberg had its first documentary mention. It was then that “Diemar von Niderenburc” bequeathed half a Hube of land from his holdings at Pfungstadt to the Lorsch Abbey on the Bergstraße for the upkeep of its daughter monastery, Steinbach, in the Odenwald.

As early as 1340 the Niedernberg Chapel, out of which it is generally believed grew today's parish church, Saint Cyriacus's, was conceived with small bequests. Both the tower and the “old quire” from 1461 are still preserved today. Extensive conversion and expansion measures were undertaken in 1897 and 1931 under Father Seubert. On the churchtower's south side is found Michael Groß's tomb slab, placed there in 1822. Groß was a jurist on the County bench. According to legend, he supposedly kept Niedernberg from destruction by the Swedes in the Thirty Years' War with his courage.

Northwest of what is today the village area – at the so-called Tannenwäldchen (roughly “Fir Grove”) – was, in the Late Middle Ages, the hanging place of the tithing area of Bachgau, to which Niedernberg belonged. The tithe court itself sat in Großostheim, whence the delinquents took their last walk along the gallows path to the hanging place.

On into the 19th century, Niedernberg was ringed by a defensive wall, parts of which, along Turmgasse and Hintermauer – whose name means “Behind Wall” – are still standing today. It could not, however, shield the inhabitants from passing troops. In the wake of the Thirty Years' War alone, the population figure was reduced almost to a tenth of what it had been.

Many citizens left their homeland in the 19th century because of limited living space, various bad harvests and social upheavals and emigrated to the United States. Only towards the end of the century, when industrialized men's outerwear manufacture took hold in Aschaffenburg and the surrounding area was there a certain upswing in the level of wealth. To prepare for times of need, agriculture was also kept. This situation lasted until the 1970s.

From an ecclesiastical point of view, Niedernberg belonged from the early 8th century until Secularization in 1803 to the Archbishopric of Mainz. Thereafter, until 1820, Niedernberg was part of the Bishopric of Regensburg with its Archbishop Karl Theodor von Dalberg. Only in 1821 did Niedernberg become part of the Bishopric of Würzburg.

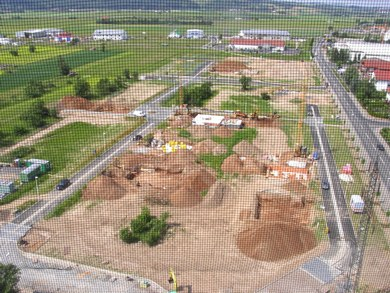
The first section of the “Tafeläcker” building area

For many centuries, Niedernberg lay far from any main trade road and led a rather sheltered life. The only link between the Spessart and the Odenwald was the Main ferry, which was withdrawn in 1994. In the meantime, however, Niedernberg has undergone sweeping structural development and of the original pastoral idyll almost nothing is left. With the direct link to the Autobahn to the Frankfurt Rhine Main Region, the completion of a great industrial-commercial area and the Main Bridge, finished in 2001, the environment became conducive to attracting various employers to the municipality. Leaders among these are currently the electronics and computer field, and also concrete processing.

Niedernberg took a blow in 2002 from M+S Elektronik AG's bankruptcy; this company was listed on the stock exchange and for a long time was said to be a showcase company. Out of 1,800 laid-off workers, 600 at the Niedernberg location alone lost their jobs. The firm's downfall due to a business loan suddenly being withdrawn despite positive financial reports and high demand drew much attention from the news media with various reports. This led to one episode of the WDR series producing “the story” under the name Bankgeheimnisse (“Bank Secrets”), which is still being broadcast often on German television today.

Currently, the Tafeläcker building area is being developed in Niedernberg in four sections. There are to be sites for 200 dwellings. The first section has been completed; the demand has been unexpectedly high.

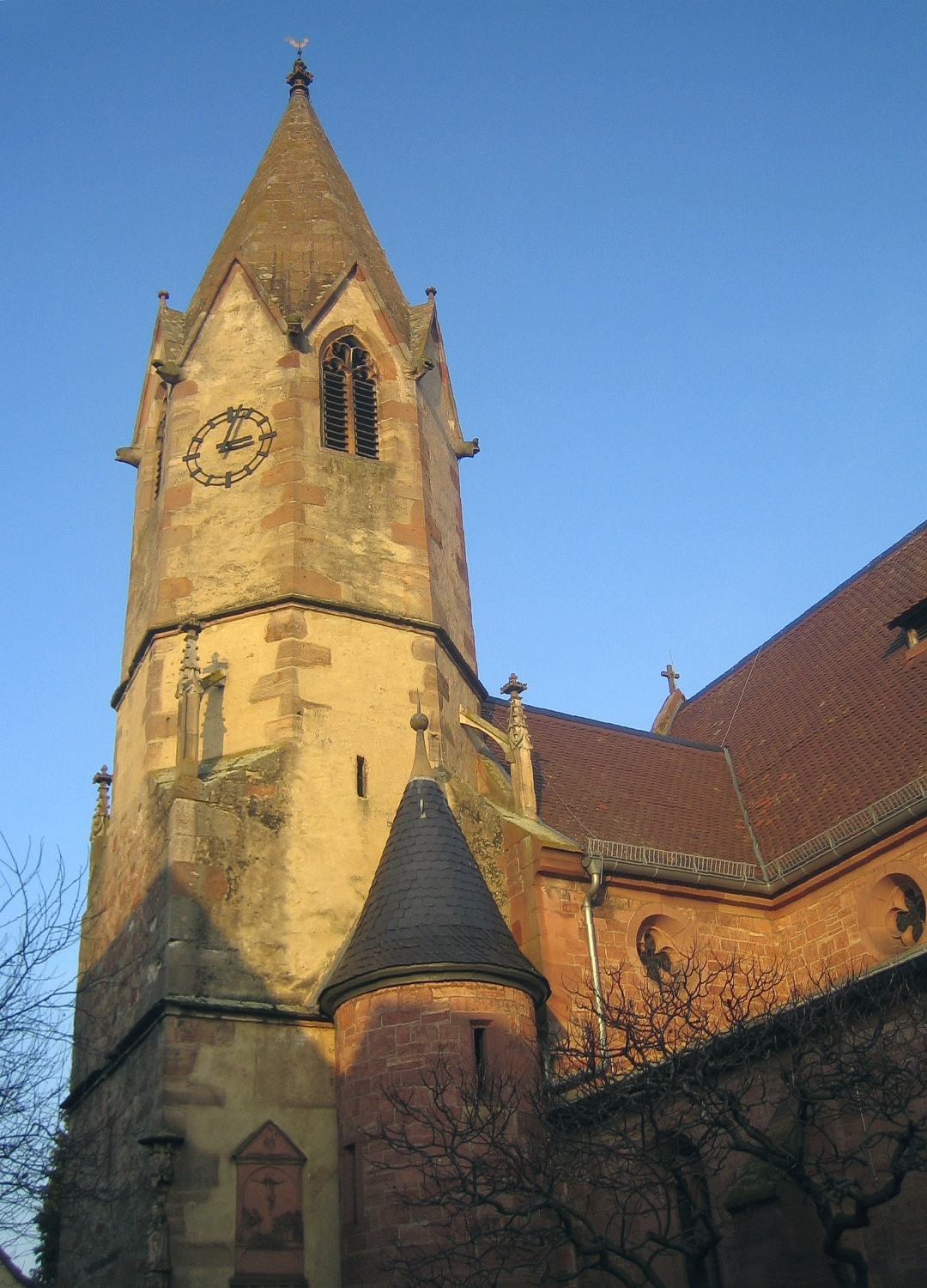
St. Cyriacus's Catholic Church's tower

=== Religion ===
Some 70% of Niedernberg dwellers are Catholic and belong to St. Cyriacus's parish. The Christuskirche (“Christ Church”) of the Evangelical Free Church community that has been in Niedernberg since 1999 is attended especially on weekends and higher church holidays by the faithful from the region and beyond. The nearest Evangelical Lutheran church is Saint Stephen's (St. Stephanus) in Großostheim.

== Politics ==
=== Municipal council ===
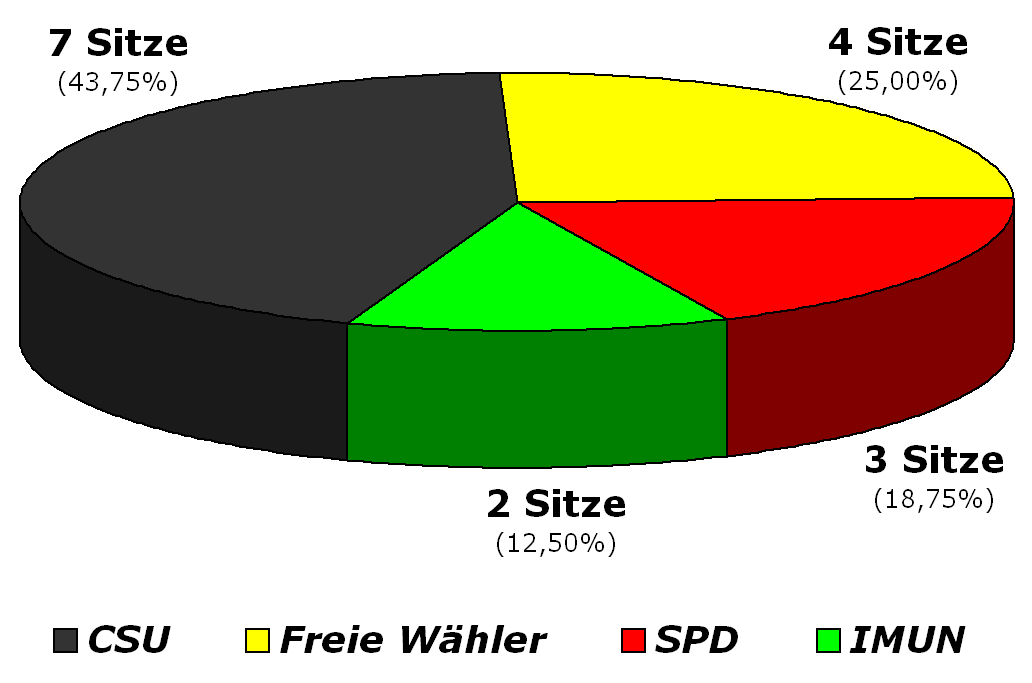
Apportionment of seats on council after the 2008 election

Since the 2008 election, which saw a voter turnout of 56.97%, the 16-member municipal council has been made up of the following political parties, with seats apportioned as shown:

- CSU: 7 seats

Udo Bieber (factional spokesman), Luise Faruga, Volker Goebel, Niko Grundhoefer, Eugen Seitz, Thomas Linke, Karin Weiler

- Freie Wähler: 4 seats

Julia Falinski, Rudi Hartlaub, Jürgen Klement (factional spokesman), Peter Reinhart

- SPD: 3 seats

Kurt Höhn-Schüßler, Josef Scheuring (factional spokesman), Alexander Wenzel

- IMUN (Initiative Mensch [“Human”] und Umwelt [“Environment”] Niedernberg): 2 seats

Siegmar Buhler (factional spokesman), Anja Bormuth

=== Mayors ===
The Chief Mayor (Erster Bürgermeister) has been since 2000 Jürgen Reinhard (CSU). His first representative is Jürgen Klement from the Freie Wähler. The Third Mayor is Volker Goebel (CSU).

In the 12 March 2006 mayoral election, Jürgen Reinhard was confirmed in office as the only candidate on the ballot with 97.53 of all valid votes, and with a voter turnout of 46.54%.

=== Town partnerships ===
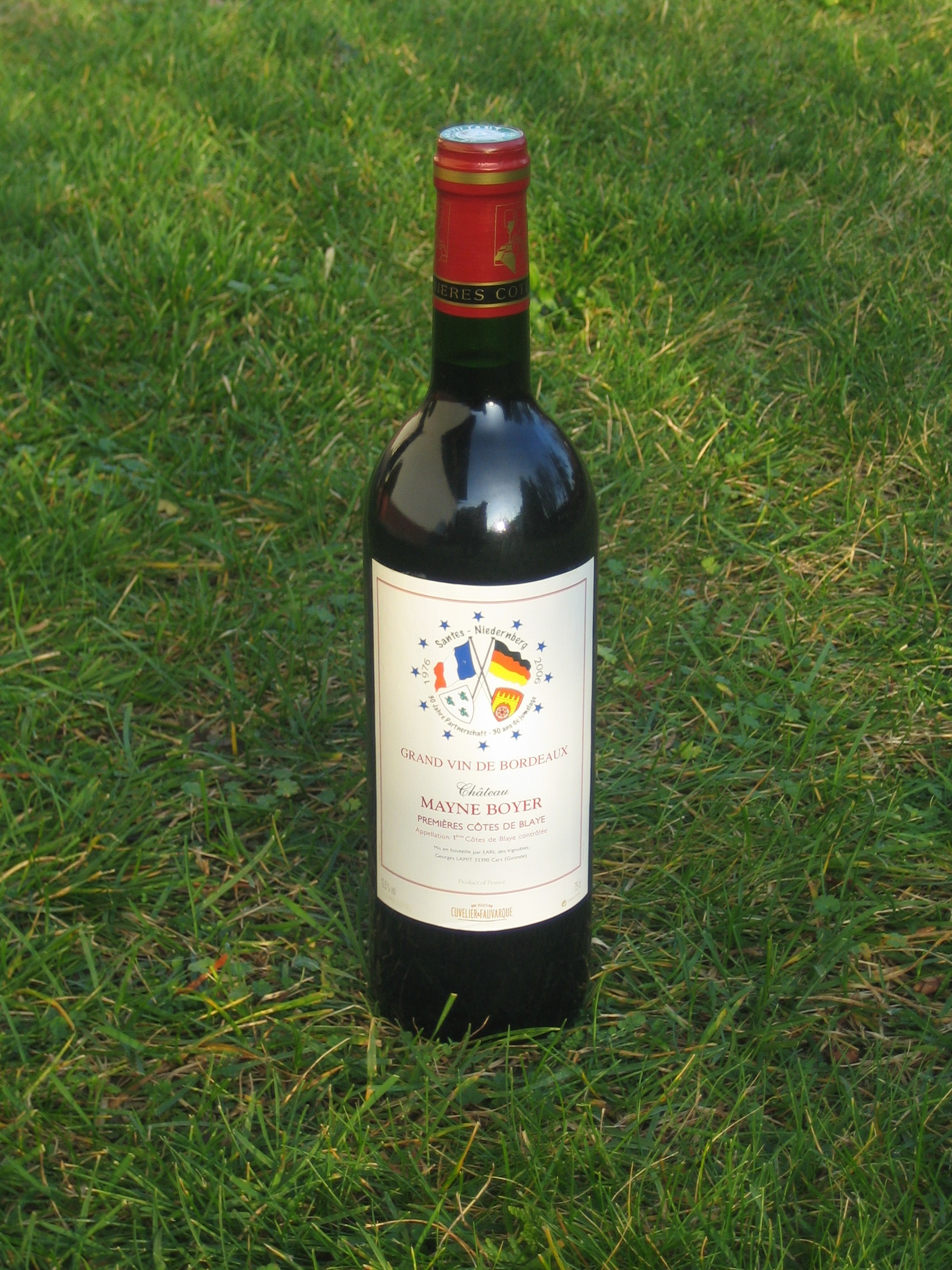
Wine for the 30-year jubilee of the town partnership

- Santes, Nord, France

From a sporting encounter in the town of Santes in the North of France in 1969 grew a friendly relationship, which on 3 May 1975 led to the signing of partnership documents between Santes and Niedernberg. In this way, both municipalities would like to make a contribution to international understanding.

Subsequently, relations have been continually expanded and solidified through exchange visits. Since 1979 there have been student exchanges between the two places, which lie 580 km apart.

=== Coat of arms ===
Niedernberg's coat of arms

The municipality's arms might be described thus: Gules a gateway crenelled of five Or, in the gateway arch a wheel spoked of six argent.

The Municipality of Niedernberg was granted approval on 3 August 1959 by the Bavarian Ministry of the Interior to bear arms. The design was executed by Dr. Merzbacher from Munich.

The charges in the arms refer to former rulers. The municipality's beginning as a Roman outpost with a castrum is expressed through the crenellated gateway. Electoral Mainz's ascendancy over the area, known to have been in force by 1292, is recalled by the Wheel of Mainz.

== Culture and sightseeing ==
=== Theatre ===
Since 1988, the theatrical group Die Blechkatzen (literally, "The Sheet Metal Cats") perform each autumn a newly rehearsed play. Audiences' exceedingly positive reactions have led today to the group's performing several weekends in a row before a sold-out house each time, and even to engagements outside Niedernberg.

=== Museums ===
Niedernberg has no museum. Nevertheless, the historical society has for several years been planning to establish a museum about Niedernberg's and the surrounding area's history in the sandstone school.

=== Tourism ===
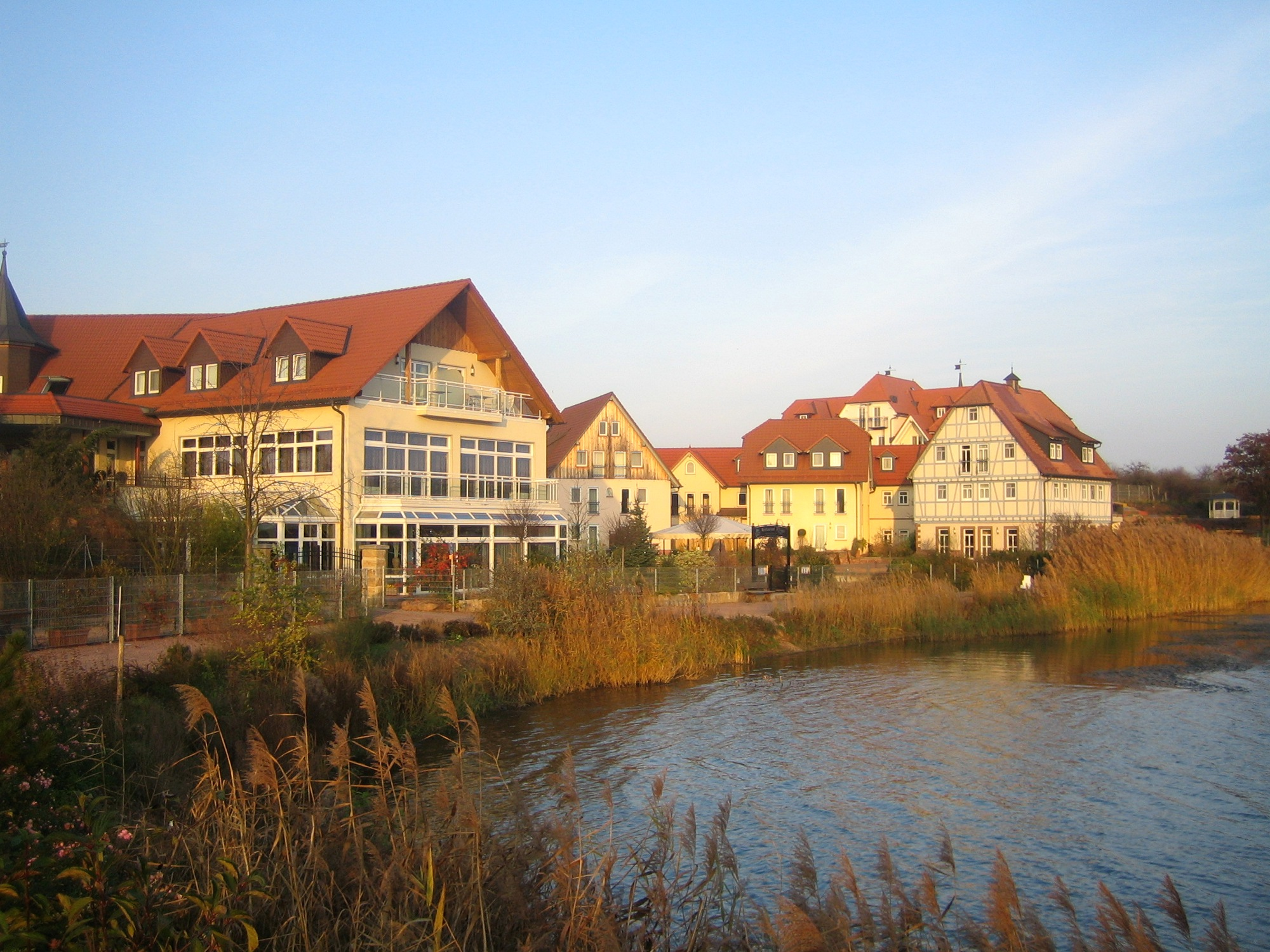
The Seehotel on the former Surfsee (“Surfing Lake”)

Despite the many offerings in nature, recreation, sports and leisure activities, Niedernberg is not a classic tourist community. In the summer half of the year in 2003 there were 7,115 overnight stays (sixth place in the district), which more than anything else could be attributed to business travellers. The average length of stay accordingly came out to a comparatively short 1.4 days.

Overnight lodgings are offered by the Seehotel as well as by the Metzgerei Reinhard (a butchershop) with guestrooms and an adjoining café.

According to the German Chamber of Industry and Trade (Deutsche Industrie- und Handelskammer, or IHK) location report, realizing plans to activate a part of the Niedernberg Lake Plateau (Niedernberger Seenplatte) for leisure and recreational ends would trigger far-reaching, positive impetus for tourism in Niedernberg.

Furthermore, at this time, a golf course is being built west of the B 469 between Großostheim and Niedernberg, a great part of which will lie within Niedernberg municipal limits, with the other part lying within Großostheim.

=== Music ===
Quite well known is the singing club Einigkeit ("Unity"), which has already won all kinds of awards and regularly enjoys good results at singing contests. For lack of new blood, there was an attempt at branching out with a new, younger choir, "Via Nova", with a repertoire of generally modern, often English-language songs. In 2005, however, owing to further staffing problems, the two choirs merged into what is now known as the Via Nova Einigkeit singing club.

The Niedernberg volunteer fire brigade's musical corps, which has existed since 1957, today counts more than 70 active members, among whom are a great many youths. This owes itself not least of all to the hunt for new blood in the municipality in the "Musicum" opened in 1999. Moreover, the musical corps has since 1985 maintained friendship contacts with the music club in Goßmannsdorf.

=== Buildings ===
Saint Cyriacus's Church (St.-Cyriakus-Kirche), whose oldest maintained parts date from 1461, is still the Catholic house of worship today. The belltower with its sandstone Madonna, likewise dating from 1461, is adorned with a stone spire. The so-called "Old Quire" is in the same style and of Gothic origin with Rhenish characteristics.

In the Hans-Herrmann-Halle, finished in 1985 many sport clubs hold their training and competitions. Concerts, major gatherings and private celebrations take place here mainly on weekends. In 2005, the multipurpose hall was thoroughly renovated, as structural shortcomings, in part dire, in the architecture once considered ultramodern led to, among other things, water leaking in and roof construction that was no longer safe.

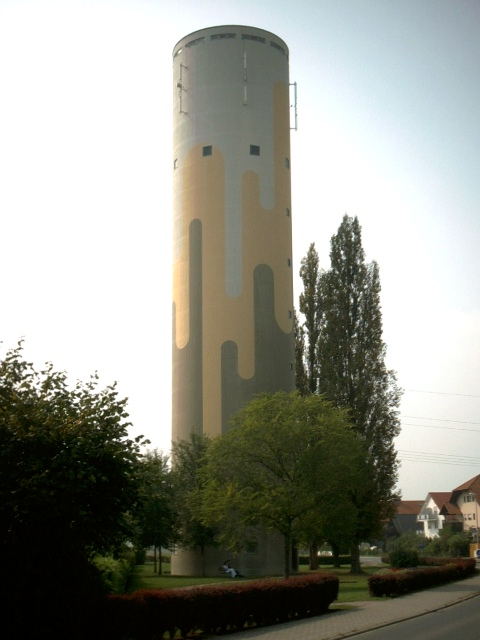
“Langer Adam” watertower

Said to be Niedernberg's landmark is the watertower built in only eleven working days in 1958 by Hochtief AG, and locally known as Langer Adam after the then mayor Adam Klement; the first word in the nickname means “long”.

Until the 1820s, all that Niedernberg had at its disposal for water was seven windlass wells. These were only converted to pumped wells in 1834. Until the municipality decided to have the wells deepened in 1859, dry summers often led to water shortages. However, when the work to channel the Main began in 1928, the groundwater rose so far up that the wellwater began to go foul. The intention to ensure a mutual water supply with the neighbouring municipalities was never realized owing to the outbreak of the Second World War. When in 1954 the first cases of typhus came to light and the health office, after doing tests, had to shut twelve of the thirteen drinking-water wells down, and also at the same time, privately built supply facilities were affected, something needed to be done quickly. The same year, building contracts were arranged. Until 1958, pipes were being laid and houses connected. The watertower's height of 44 m was necessary given that local conditions, as in the neighbouring municipalities, precluded using high-level tanks to get the needed water pressure. The Niedernberg watertower has a diameter throughout its height of 10 m. The two watertanks, made of watertight reinforced concrete, hold 250 000 L and provide a water pressure of 3.5 at in the waterpipe network. The watertower's paint job in brown, yellow and grey came during the refurbishment in 1982. Since then, its appearance has changed only with the installation of a variety of cellular antennae.

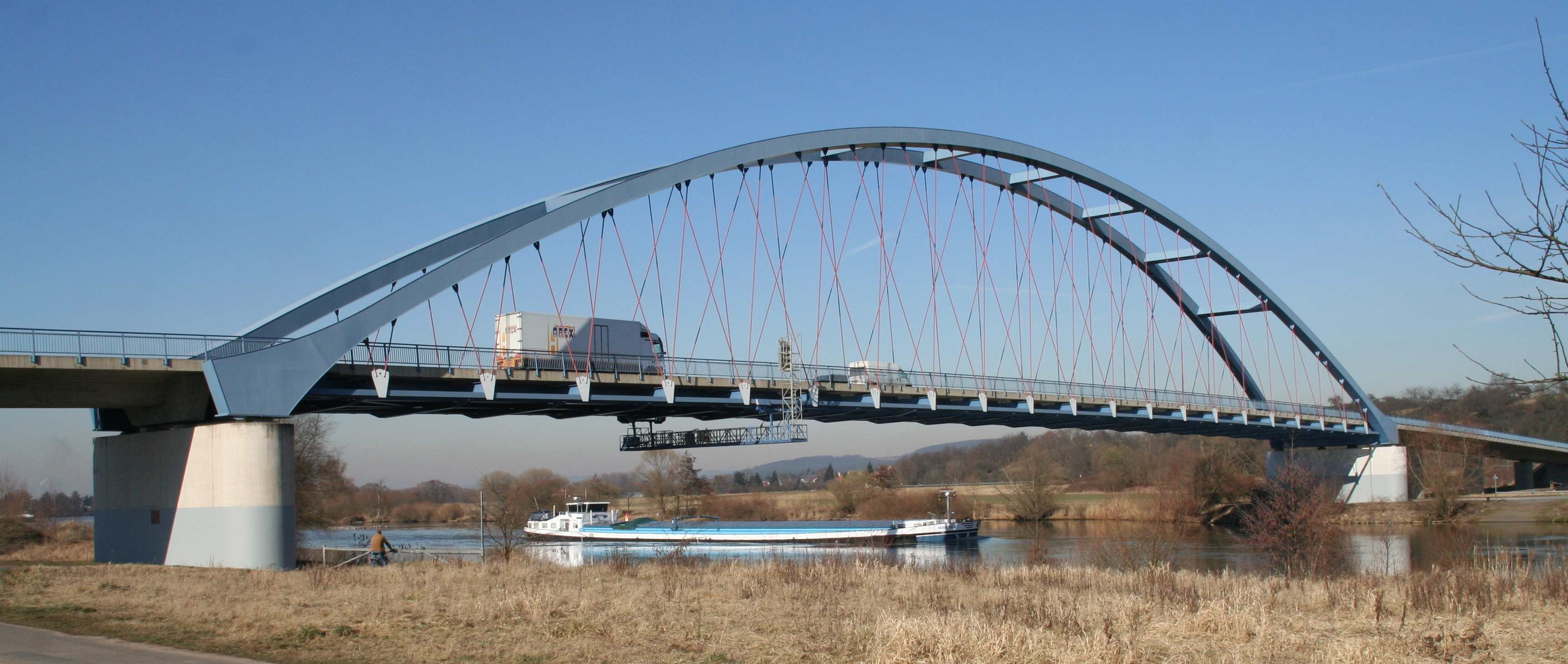
The Niedernberg–Sulzbach Main Bridge, built in 2001

Since 2001, a roadbridge has spanned the Main in Niedernberg's municipal area. The bridge has a span between supports of 150 m and is distinguished by its slanted, crossing hangers, a seldom used construction form in Germany.

=== Clubs and associations ===
Given its population, Niedernberg has a great number of clubs and associations.

In the field of sports, besides the tradition-rich angling and cycle ball clubs, the Reiselust carrier pigeon club, the gymnastic club, the DJK (Deutsche Jugendkraft, or "German Youth Power" – a Catholic sporting association), the strength sport club Germania, the sailing and surfing club and the football club SpVgg Niedernberg, there are also a handicapped sports group, a tennis club, a skittle club and a table football club.

There are also local chapters of the Bavarian Red Cross, the Federation of German Catholic Youth (Bund der deutschen katholischen Jugend, or BDKJ), the DPSG, the volunteer fire brigade, which had its beginnings as far back as 1855, and the KJG (a Catholic youth group).

The historical society, through its various activities, holds a special importance in Niedernberg. The Carnival club NCV Niedernberg e.V. is known far across the region.

=== Regular events ===
- Starkbierfest (“bock festival”) in March
- Local football championship and Fest unter den Linden in June
- Village festival with "Lower Franconia’s longest beer mile" in September on the occasion of the kermis
- Several wine festivals

=== Gastronomy ===
In Niedernberg, there are many inns with international and typical local fare. Recognition has been earned by the restaurant Blecherne Katz right near the Town Hall, the nearby wine parlour Zum Wagner and the Seehotel in its quiet location, and with its overnight accommodations.

The oldest inns still in business today are the Zur Gemütlichkeit, which was first granted a licence in 1875, and the Mainaussicht (formerly Mainlust), where in 1867, waggoners and shippers were already being served drinks and in 1896 an inn was officially being run.

=== Lake area ===
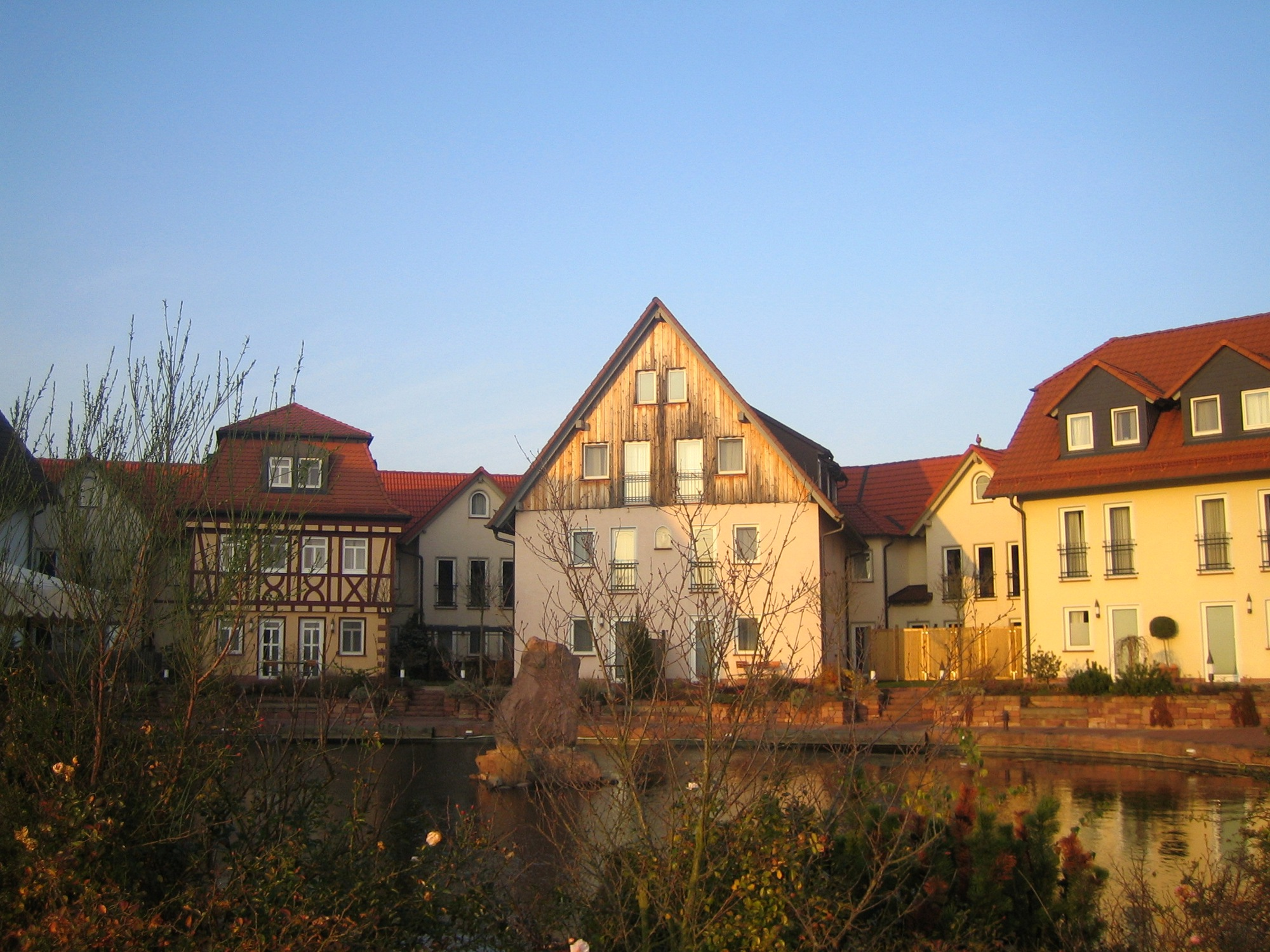
The Seehotel

Gravel quarrying in Niedernberg left in its wake consequences in the form of the Niedernberg Lake Plateau (Niedernberger Seenplatte). This is made up of several bigger and smaller lakes and can be found in Niedernberg's south. For a long time the Lake Plateau turned out to be a real problem for Niedernberg, as in the summer thousands of people from all over the district came to use the biggest lake as an unofficial bathing pond. This led to catastrophic traffic-flow problems on Kreisstraße (district road) MIL 38, for visitors would simply park their cars right at the edge of the road. Unapproved parties at the lake led to heavy pollution of much of the lakeside.

In 2004 a decision was approved to build a public bathing beach. The beach was finished in time for the 2005 bathing season, and improvement to the location is clearly visible. In the future, the municipality wishes to open the Lake Plateau even more to tourism, as it is believed that there is great growth potential here. A first step in this direction is represented by the hotel on the lake, which is nonetheless mostly patronized by business travellers. On 18 October 2006, an expansion to the Seehotel was approved during a session of Niedernberg municipal council.

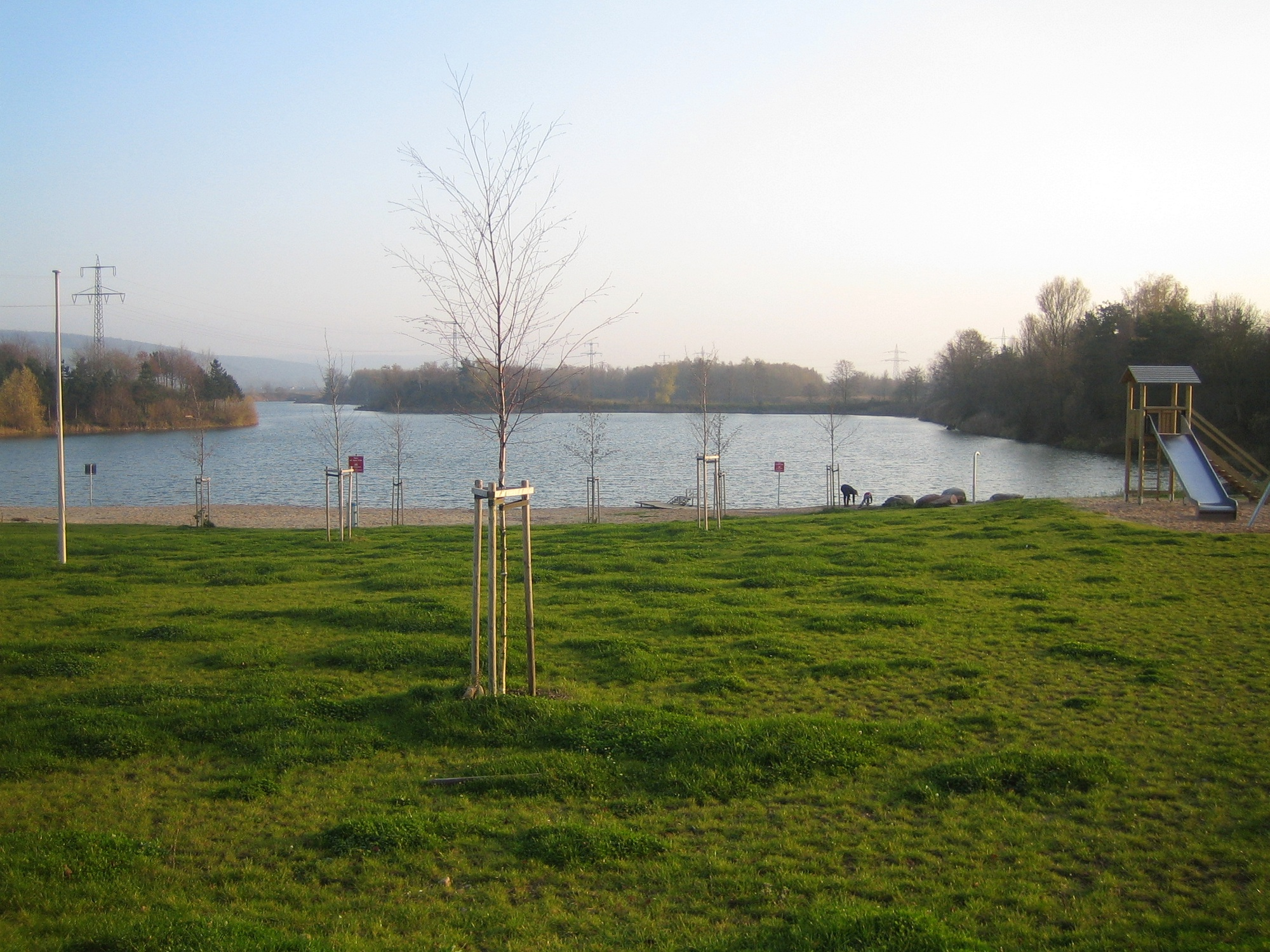
“HonischBeach” bathing lake and recreation area

=== Other ===
- Extensive recreation area in the nearby forest with barbecue pit
- Marked hiking paths
- "HonischBeach" recreation area with bathing and diving school on the former so-called Surfsee (“Surfing Lake”)
- Cycle path network throughout the municipal area
- BMX track, playing fields and skating facility

== Economy and infrastructure ==
The Bavarian Lower Main (Bayerischer Untermain) belongs to the outermost reaches of the Frankfurt Rhine Main Region, an urban agglomeration surrounding that city, and structurally leans strongly in this direction. The direct link to Bundesstraße 469 and the Autobahn A 3 favours the resident industrial and handicraft businesses.

=== Transport ===
==== Road ====
Niedernberg can be easily reached by car, as it is linked through the B 469 to the Autobahnen A 3 and A 45. All together, Niedernberg road network has a length of 32 km.

==== Local public transport ====
A major railway station is to be found in Aschaffenburg (Aschaffenburg Hauptbahnhof), 15 km away. Crossing Niedernberg are bus routes 60 (Obernburg, Großwallstadt, Nilkheim and Aschaffenburg) and 56 (Sulzbach, Großostheim). During the work week these public transport association buses run hourly, and on weekends every two hours.

==== Harbours ====
Niedernberg can even be reached by waterway. The nearest major harbour is the marina in Aschaffenburg (for sport boats, private yachts and the like). There is also an industrial harbour there, Hafen Aschaffenburg, Lower Franconia's biggest harbour.

==== Airports ====
Not far afield lie Frankfurt Airport and Aschaffenburg Airport. Moreover, in the neighbouring municipality of Obernau is found the Altenbach gliderport.

=== Established businesses ===
The biggest employer in Niedernberg, with roughly 160 workers, is the firm ABI, in existence since 1974, a market leader in the field of special underground construction equipment. Furthermore, the Gries Deco Company (which owns a department store chain called Das Depot) has its head office here as well as a branch.

Moreover, in the last few years, around the Flügel-Zentrum, a great number of businesses have set up shop, among them supermarkets such as NORMA and Rewe, a s.Oliver shop and remainder sales department, a bookshop and all together three of the five bakeries now in business in Niedernberg.

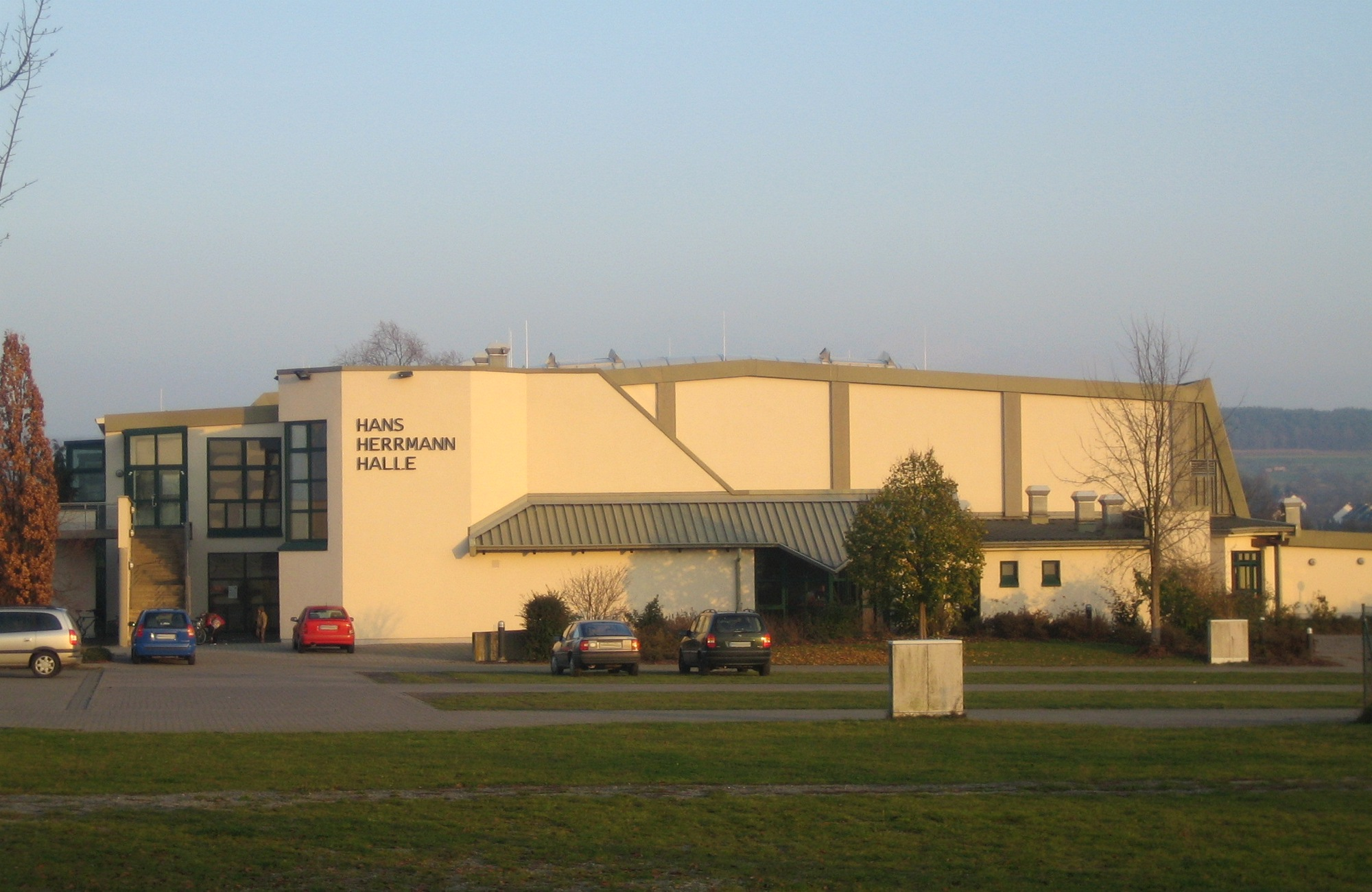
Hans-Herrmann-Halle

=== Public institutions ===
- Two kindergartens
- Catholic Public Library
- Hans-Herrmann-Halle (multipurpose hall)

=== Education ===
The primary school, completed in 1979 was attended in the 2006-2007 school year by 237 pupils.

The Volksschule (built in 1960) is attended by 45 local pupils and another 41 from Großwallstadt within the framework of a collective school. Furthermore, 66 pupils from Niedernberg go to the Hauptschule in Großwallstadt.

Besides a school lunch, there is, with the parents' association's help, regular, optional homework supervision in Niedernberg.

== Famous people ==
- David Schnabel (twice world champion in singles artistic cycling)

== Other ==
Widely known is the nickname “Honisch” for Niedernberg. Contrary to what many believe, this has nothing to do with honey (Honig in German, and pronounced quite similarly), but rather comes from a former way of pronouncing the auxiliary verb haben ("have"). This word alone was enough to tell people from the surrounding communities apart by their dialect (Niedernberg: hohn, Großwallstadt: hewwe, Großostheim: haoun).

Earlier generations in Niedernberg customarily said, instead of the standard German habe ich ("have I"), the local form hohn isch, leading those in neighbouring places to give them the nickname "Honisch". Over the years, this designation has become a "brandname", particularly at Carnival time.

== Statistics ==
=== Population development ===
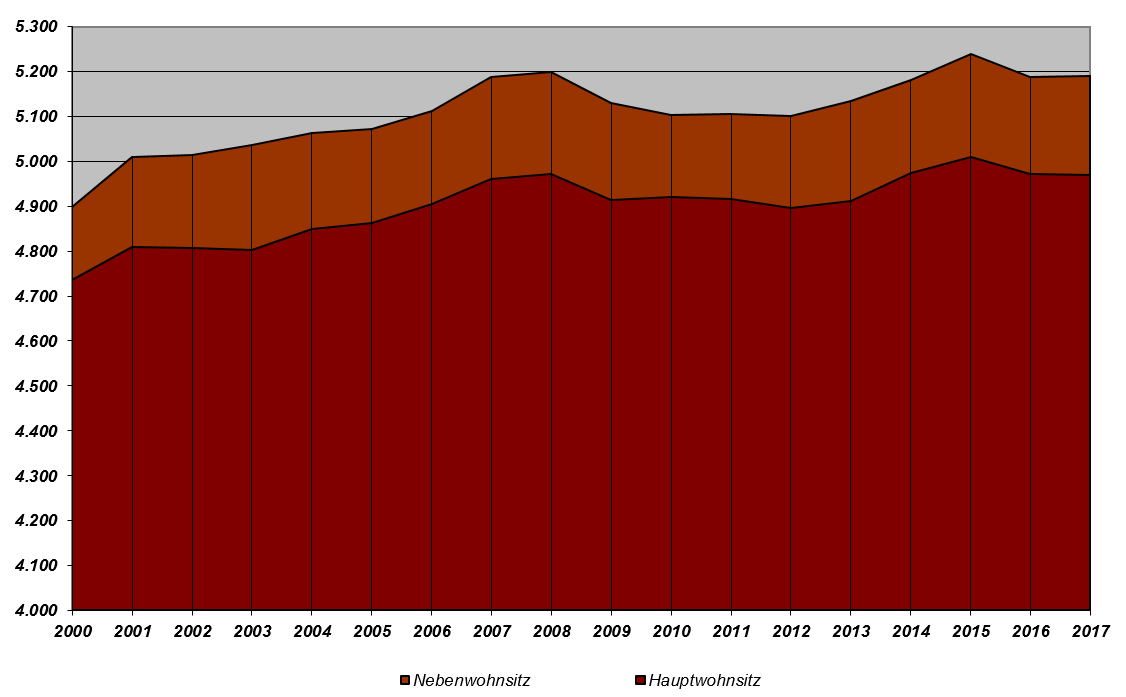
Population development

Niedernberg has the Miltenberg district's highest population growth.

	31 Dec 2000	31 Dec 2001	31 Dec 2002	31 Dec 2003	31 Dec 2004	31 Oct 2005	31 Oct 2006	31 Oct 2007
Main residence	4,736	4,810	4,806	4,802	4,849	4,841	4,900	4,950
Secondary residence	163	200	207	234	215	214	201	205
Total inhabitants	4,899	5,010	5,013	5,036	5,064	5,055	5,101	5,155

=== Historical population development ===
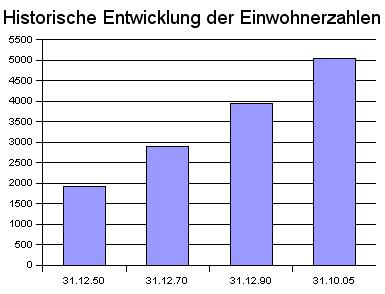
Historical population development

	Population figure
31 Dec. 1900	1,070
31 Dec. 1950	1,920
31 Dec. 1970	2,900
31 Dec. 1990	3,960
31 Oct. 2005	4,841

=== Budget ===
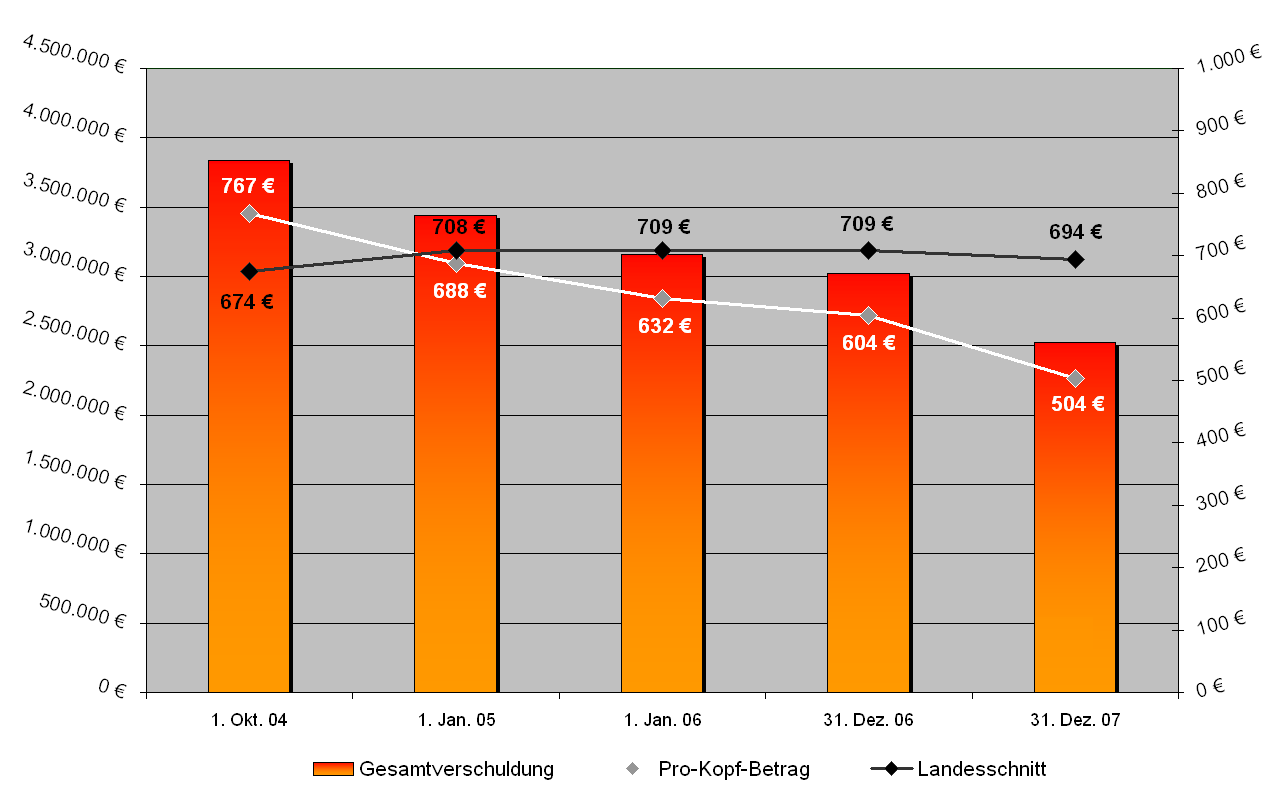
Development of Niedernberg's debt compared to the state average

Niedernberg's collective budget amounted in 2007 to a total of €16,376,000, representing a rise of 11.46% over 2005. Work has been done for years on eliminating debt and according to a plan, no new loans have been assumed.

	Total debt	Per capita	State average
1 Oct 2004	€3,838,056	€767	€674
1 Jan 2005	€3,442,677	€688	€708
1 Jan 2006	€3,159,621	€632	€709
31 Dec 2006	€3,020,426	€604	€709
31 Dec 2007	€2,524,358	€504	€694

=== Commerce ===
	Declared businesses according to commercial register as at 31 Oct. 2005
Sole proprietorships	325
GmbH	101
other (AG, KG, GbR)	16

=== Foreigners ===
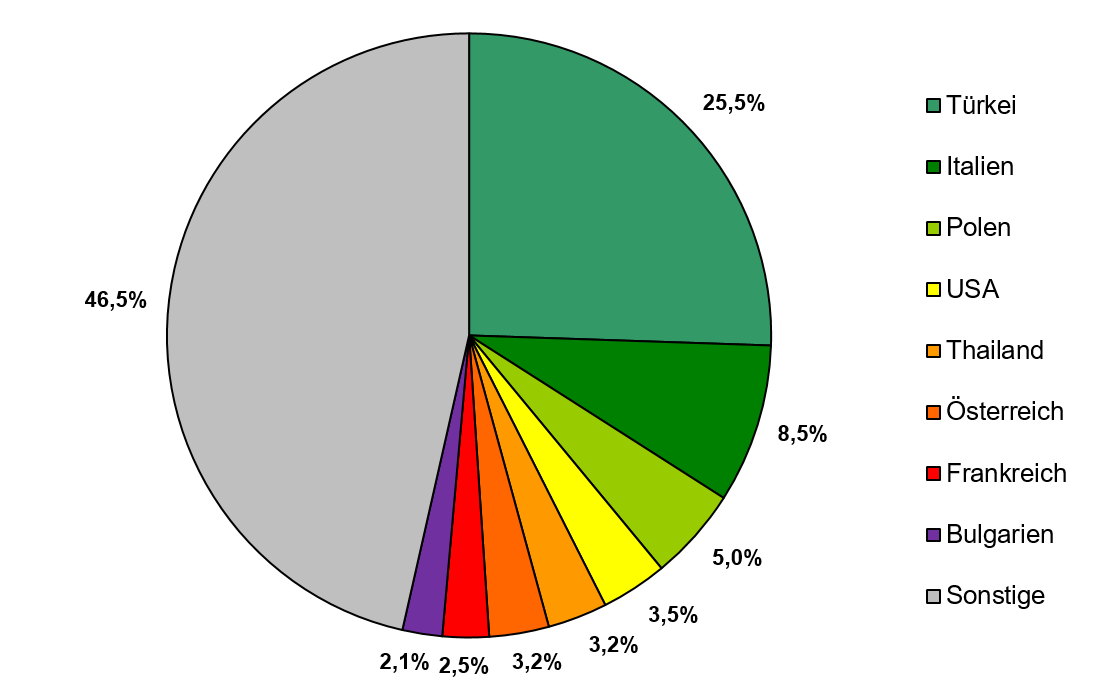
Percentage shares of foreign inhabitants by nationality; as at 2006

All together, 253 people of foreign nationality from 39 different nations live in Niedernberg. This makes 4.91% of the population. The most foreign inhabitants come from Turkey (97 persons, 1.87% of the population). Compared with the district average of 9.9%, relatively few non-German nationals live in Niedernberg. The figure is likewise higher for the Regierungsbezirk of Lower Franconia at 7.0%.

	Number	Percentage
Total	253	4.91%
Turkey	97	1.87%
Italy	23	0.44%
Austria	13	0.25%
Thailand	11	0.21%
USA	10	0.19%
France	10	0.19%
Poland	10	0.19%
other	75	1.45%
