= Großostheim =

- Municipality
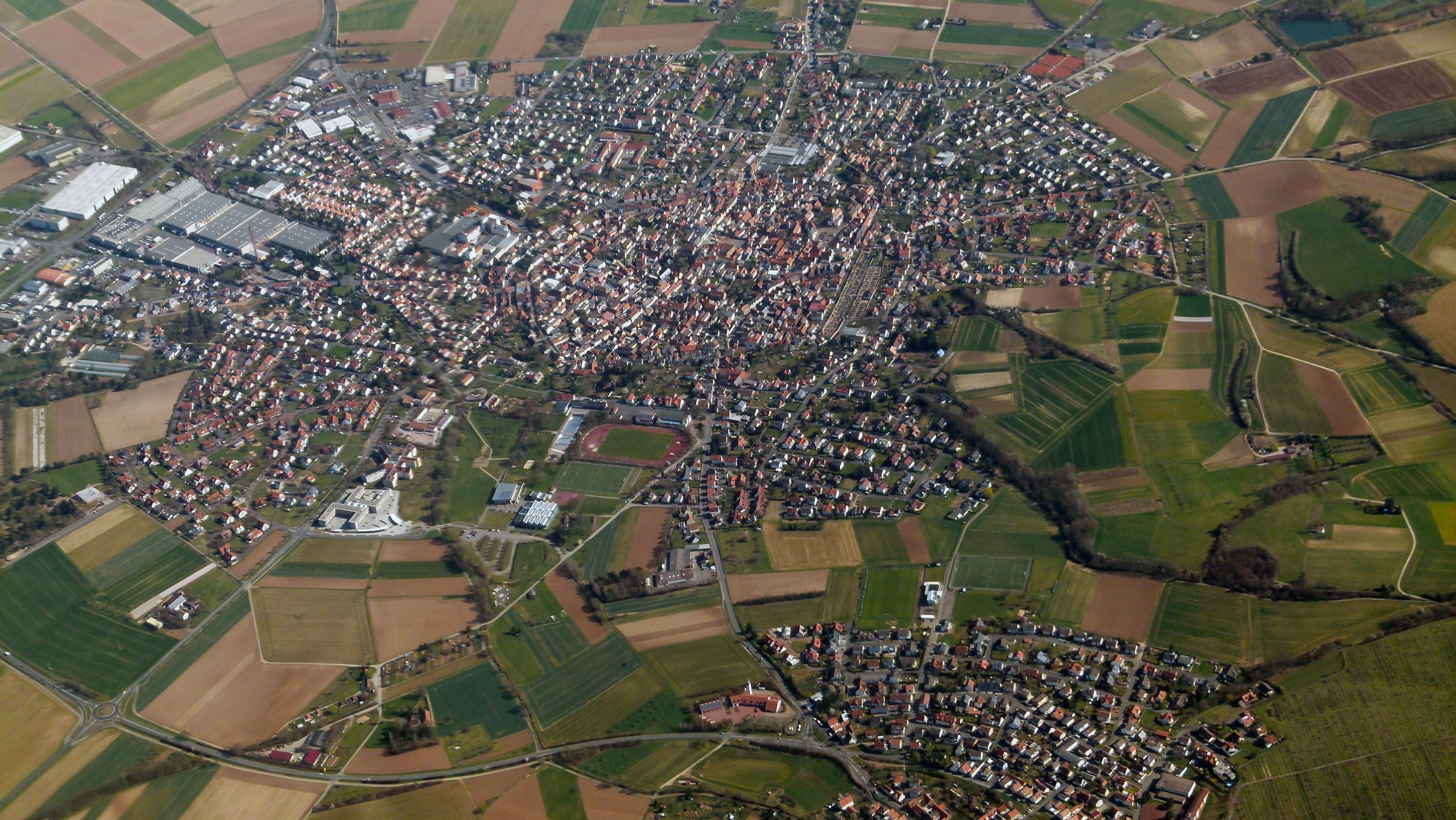
- Aerial view

- Coat of arms

- Location of Großostheim within Aschaffenburg district
- Interactive map of Großostheim
- Location within Germany Location within Bavaria
- Coordinates: 49°55′N 9°5′E
- Country: Germany
- State: Bavaria
- Admin. region: Unterfranken
- District: Aschaffenburg

Government
  - Mayor (2020–26): Herbert Jakob (CSU)

Area
  - Total: 44.31 km^{2} (17.11 sq mi)
- Elevation: 137 m (449 ft)

Population (2025-12-31)
  - Total: 15,762
  - Density: 355.7/km^{2} (921.3/sq mi)
- Time zone: UTC+01:00 (CET)
  - Summer (DST): UTC+02:00 (CEST)
- Postal codes: 63762
- Dialling codes: 06026
- Vehicle registration: AB
- Website: www.grossostheim.de

Großostheim (or Grossostheim) is a market municipality in the Aschaffenburg district in the Regierungsbezirk of Lower Franconia (Unterfranken) in Bavaria, Germany. The inhabitants call themselves Aistmer (ostheimers).

== Geography ==
=== Location ===
Großostheim lies on the northeast edge of the Odenwald in the Bavarian Lower Main (Bayerischer Untermain) region.

=== Gemeindeteile ===
Gemeindeteile

Großostheim's Gemeindeteile are Großostheim, Pflaumheim, Wenigumstadt and Ringheim.

=== Neighbouring municipalities ===
Clockwise from the north, these are the municipality of Stockstadt, the district-free town of Aschaffenburg, the municipality of Niedernberg, the municipality of Mömlingen (both in Miltenberg district) and the municipality of Schaafheim (Darmstadt-Dieburg).

Together with Stockstadt am Main and the neighbouring Hessian municipality of Schaafheim, the market municipality forms the historic Bachgau region.

== History ==
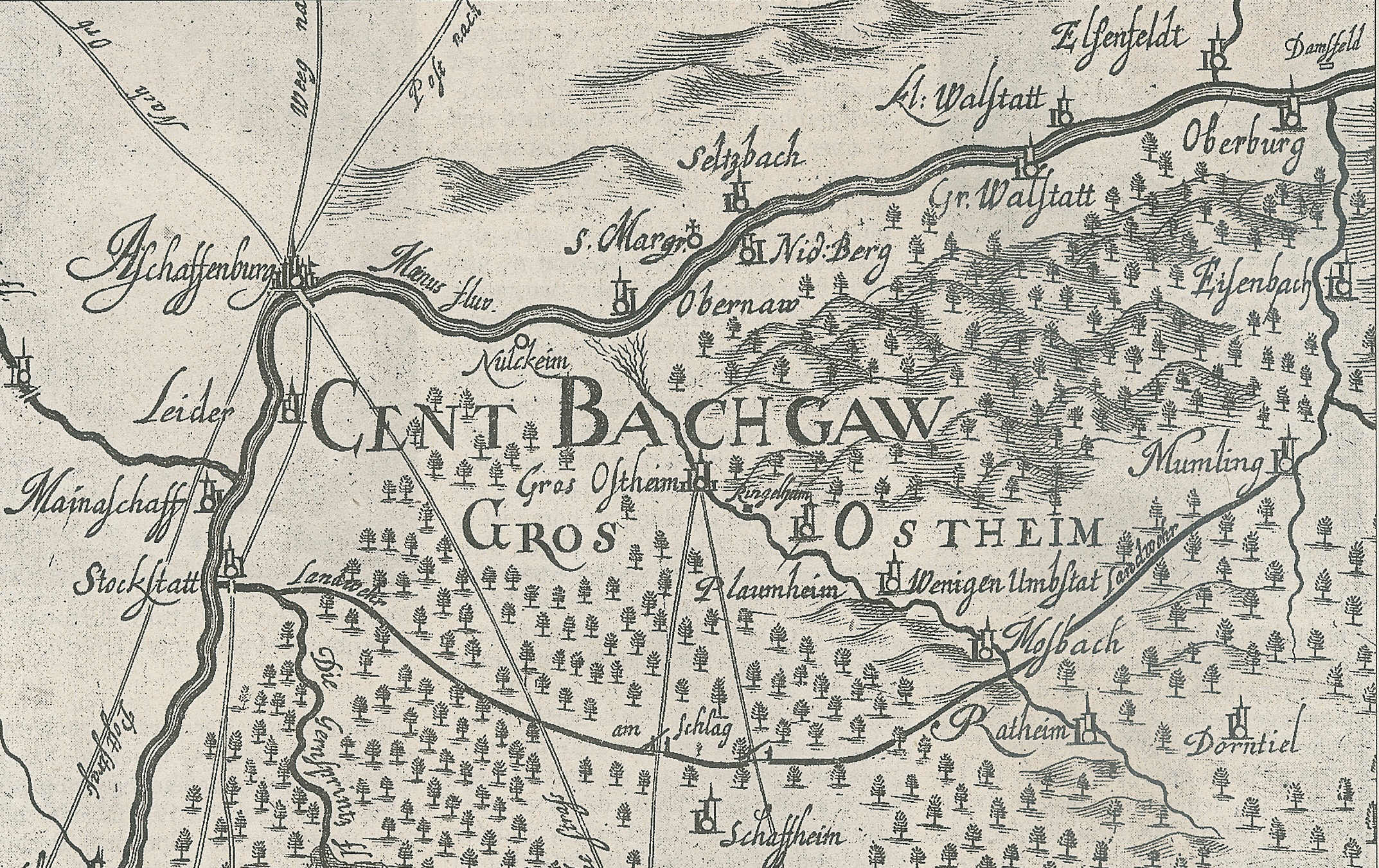
“Cent Bachgaw”, engraving by Nicolaus Person 1695

The market municipality of Großostheim, as a greater municipality, is made up of the Gemeindeteile of Großostheim, Ringheim, Pflaumheim and Wenigumstadt. While Ringheim has always been part of Großostheim, the other two places, Pflaumheim and Wenigumstadt, have only been as much since municipal reform on 1 May 1978.

Ostheim, called Großostheim since the 18th century – groß is German for “great” or “big” – had its first documentary mention in a document from the Fulda Abbey dating from sometime between 780 and 799.

Ostheim belonged from the time of its first documentary mention to various lordly domains, before it passed along with the whole Bachgau to the Electorate of Mainz.

The Gemeindeteil of Ringheim gets its name from an older village that died out in the early 16th century. The Ringheimer Mühle – a mill, formerly an inn and a farmhouse – seems to be the last piece of property from the old Ringheim. The new Ringheim arose after 1945 on the lands of the former Luftwaffe base, in whose barracks and other buildings Germans driven out of their homelands were housed. Quick growth with industries locating in the new settlement has made of the initially small Gemeindeteil a considerable settlement today, which has become a desirable place to live.

The Gemeindeteil of Pflaumheim, despite lying right near the significant centre of Ostheim, had always been an independent municipality. It did, however, belong ecclesiastically as a branch parish to the parish of St. Peter and Paul in Großostheim. Only in 1923 did Pflaumheim, with its Kirche St. Luzia (church) become an independent parish. In 1994, Pflaumheim's 1,200-year jubilee was celebrated, as in 794 the Pflaumgau, and in the same era Pflaumheim itself, were named in documents handed down from the Lorsch and Fulda Abbeys.

The Gemeindeteil of Wenigumstadt had its first documentary mention in 1229 as villa Omestad minore. The village had, however, surely been settled much earlier, as the many archaeological finds from Wenigumstadt show a human presence from every cultural epoch in the last 7,000 years.

The former (until 1782) Electoral Mainz Vogteiamt (Vogt district) became in 1803 part of Archbishop-Elector of Mainz Karl von Dalberg's newly formed Electorate of Aschaffenburg, along with which, under the terms of the Treaties of Paris, it passed in 1814 (by this time it had become a department of the Grand Duchy of Frankfurt) to Bavaria.

In the course of administrative reform in Bavaria, the current municipality came into being with the Gemeindeedikt (“Municipal Edict”) of 1818.

== Population development ==
Within the municipal area lived 12,788 inhabitants in 1970, 13,514 in 1987, 15,913 in 2000 and 16,299 in 2004.

== Politics ==
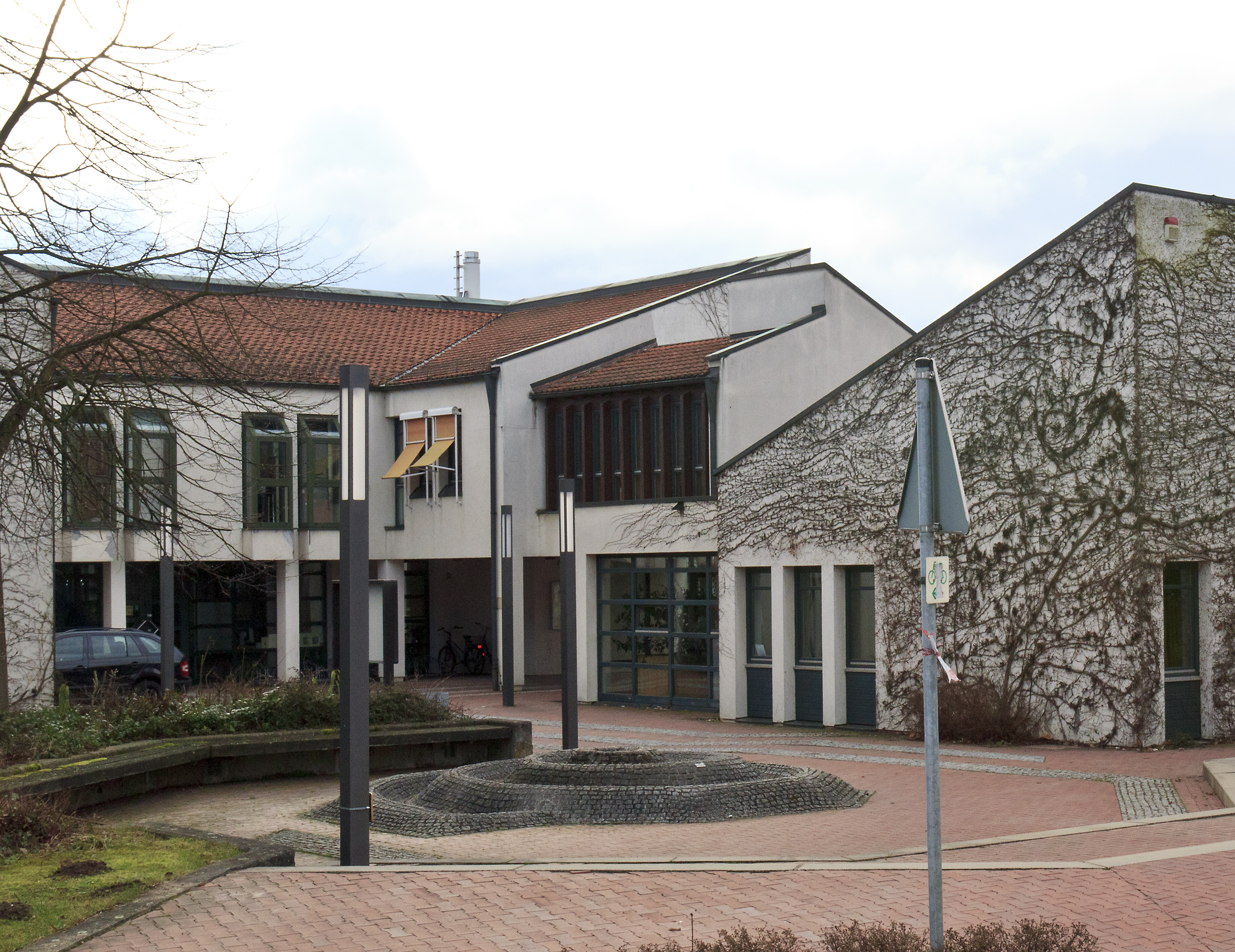
Town Hall

The mayor is Herbert Jakob (CSU), elected in April 2014 and re-elected in 2020.

The income from municipal taxes in 1999 amounted to €9,751,000 (converted) of which net intake from business taxes amounted to €3,180,000.

=== Coat of arms ===
The municipality's arms might be described thus: Party per fess Or and sable, a buck salient of the second langued gules and couped at the thigh, and three trefoils slipped argent.

Until the 18th century, Großostheim was known simply as Ostheim. It was in 1774 that the name Großostheim first cropped up. The coat of arms, conferred on 17 January 1911 by Prince Regent Luitpold and borne ever since, is a combination of the 17th-century municipality seal, which is no longer on hand, and a smaller version of the arms borne by the family Schad, whose members called themselves Schad von Ostheim. The family died out in 1581, after having lived for centuries in the Bachgau, to whose tithing district the municipality of Ostheim then belonged. The cloverleaves below the parting was a popular, old local symbol for agriculture. They are taken from the lost Großostheim municipality seal and refer to how, in the course of time, clover growing displaced winegrowing.

== Culture and sightseeing ==
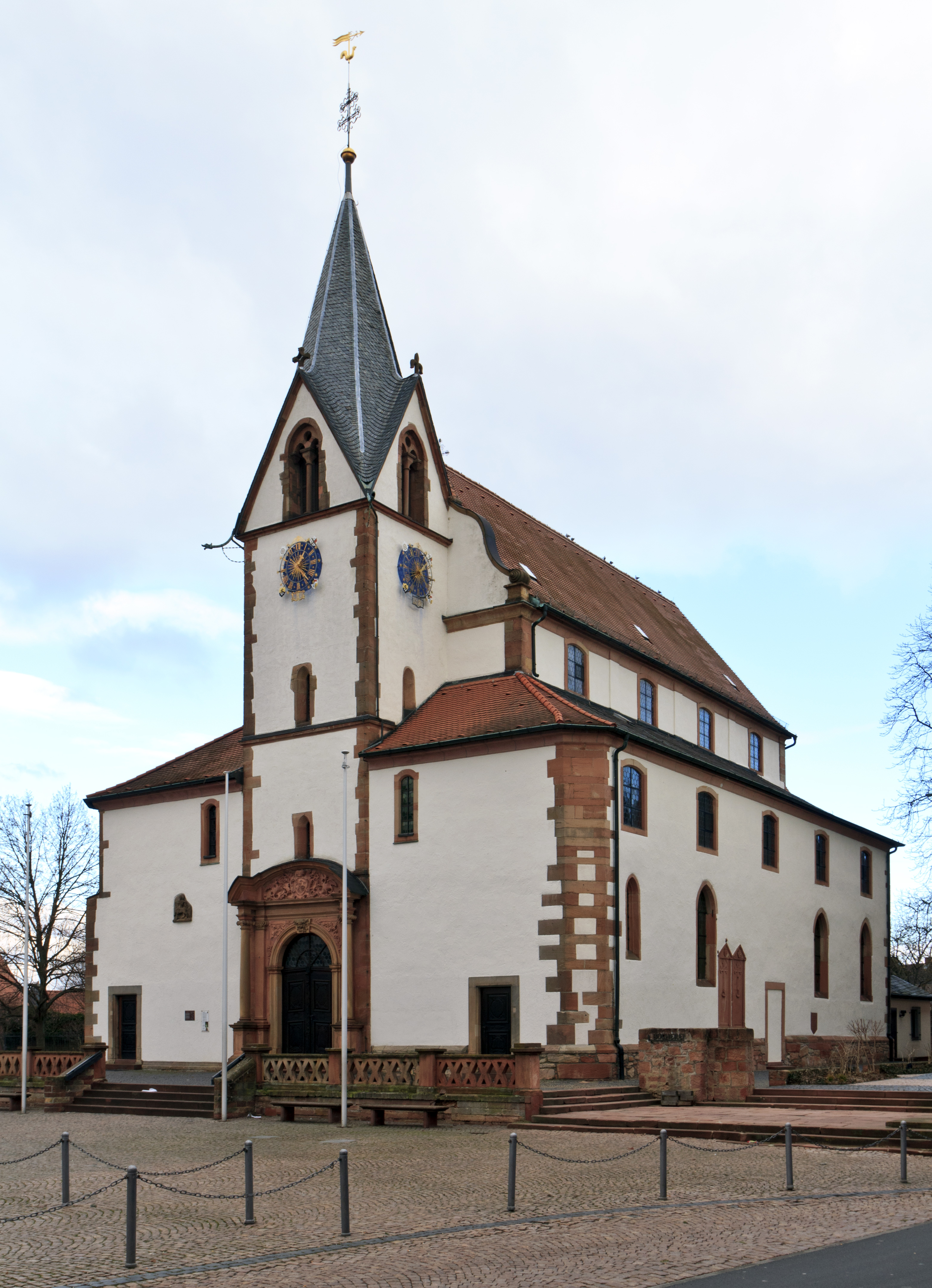
Saints Peter's and Paul's parish church

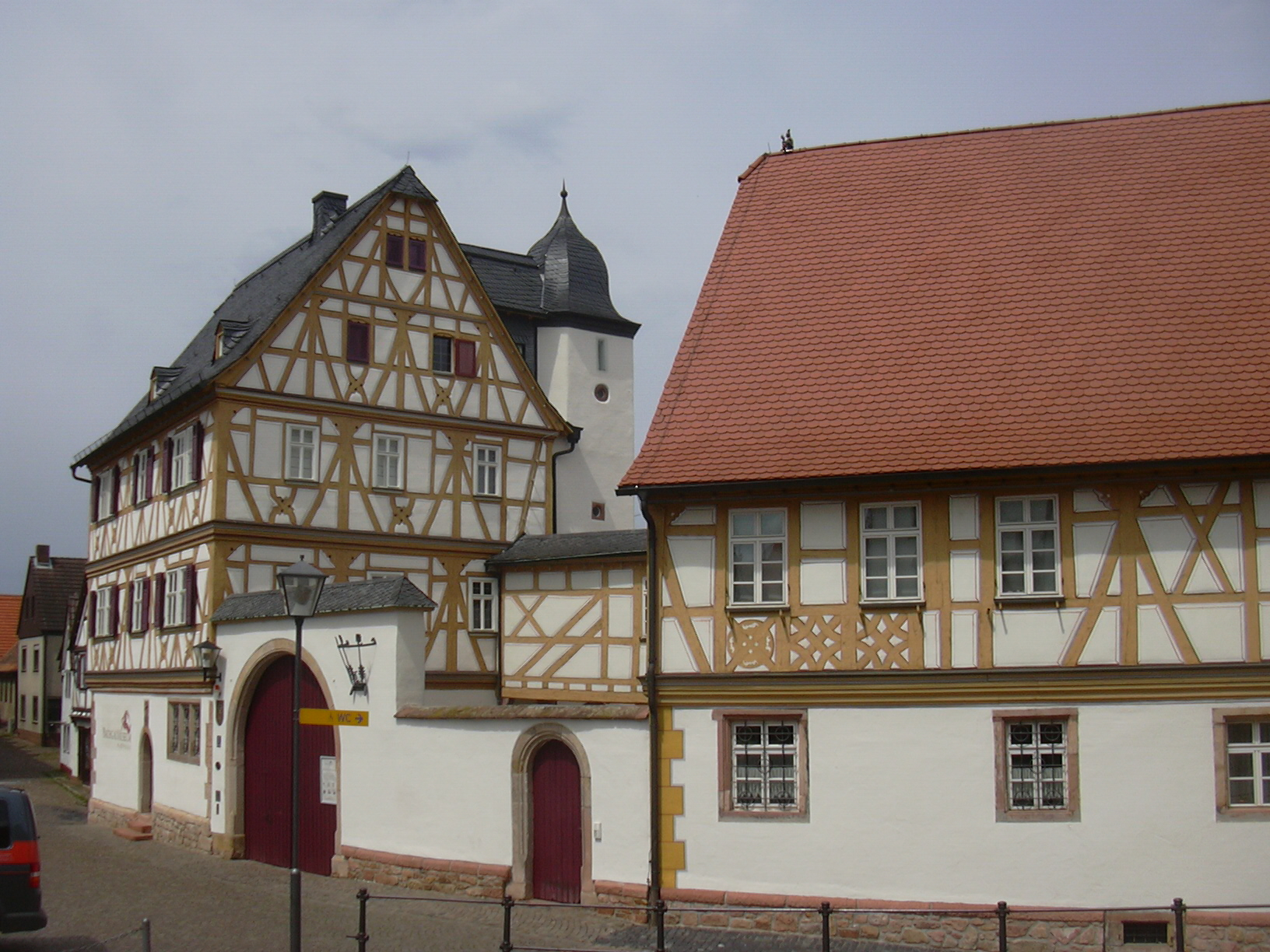
Nöthig-Gut at the marketplace (Bachgaumuseum)

- The Catholic Saints Peter's and Paul's parish church (St. Peter und Paul) holds a “Lamentation of Christ” by Tilman Riemenschneider (1515), which is iconographically and stylistically akin to earlier work at the Hessenthal Pilgrimage Church.
- Housed today in the timber-frame Nöthig-Gut at the marketplace, a former feudal estate held by the Mainz cathedral provosts (1537–1629), is the Bachgaumuseum. The exhibits display regional crafts and agriculture in the 19th century, with a local emphasis.
- Timber-frame houses from the 16th to 18th centuries characterize the whole core of the municipality, on the marketplace, Marktgasse, Kanzleistraße, Haarstraße and Breite Straße. With 148 houses under monumental protection (as at 2007), Großostheim is thereby a leader in the Aschaffenburg district.
- Of the town fortifications torn down in the 19th century, all that has been left standing is the Spitzer Turm (“Sharp Tower”, a prison tower with a dungeon), the Stumpfer Turm (“Blunt Tower”, the powder tower), the Hexenturm ("Witches’ Tower"), in which in 1602 and 1603 eleven women were found guilty of witchcraft in the Electoral Mainz) and a small remnant of the formerly 2 km-long town wall on Grabenstraße.
- Three chapels stand in Großostheim. A local farrier, Peter Drippel, built one of these in 1517 and it was consecrated to the patron saint of his craft, Saint Eligius. The so-called Frauhäuschen is a chapel sacred to Mary (late 15th century). The most important piece of decoration at the Kreuzkapelle (“Cross Chapel”) is a Crucifixion scene by Hans Backoffen, a late work from 1513.
- In the Gemeindeteil of Pflaumheim stands the oldest town hall in the Bachgau. The timber-frame building, restored in 1981, comes from 1548. A stylistically similar town hall building from 1584 is found in the Gemeindeteil of Wenigumstadt.
- Großostheim lies on the Einhardsweg. This 77 km-long hiking and cycling trail follows Charlemagne’s biographer Einhard’s footsteps, running from Bad König to Hanau.
- Thirty-six Bildstöcke (sing. Bildstock – a cross-shaped or columnar pillar functioning as a wayside shrine) from the 16th to 18th centuries stand along the hiking and cycling trails right nearby.
- Filmed in Großostheim from 1988 to 1992 was the television series Mit Leib und Seele with regional actor Günter Strack in the main role. However, the town was known in the show as Eberfeld.

== Economy and infrastructure ==
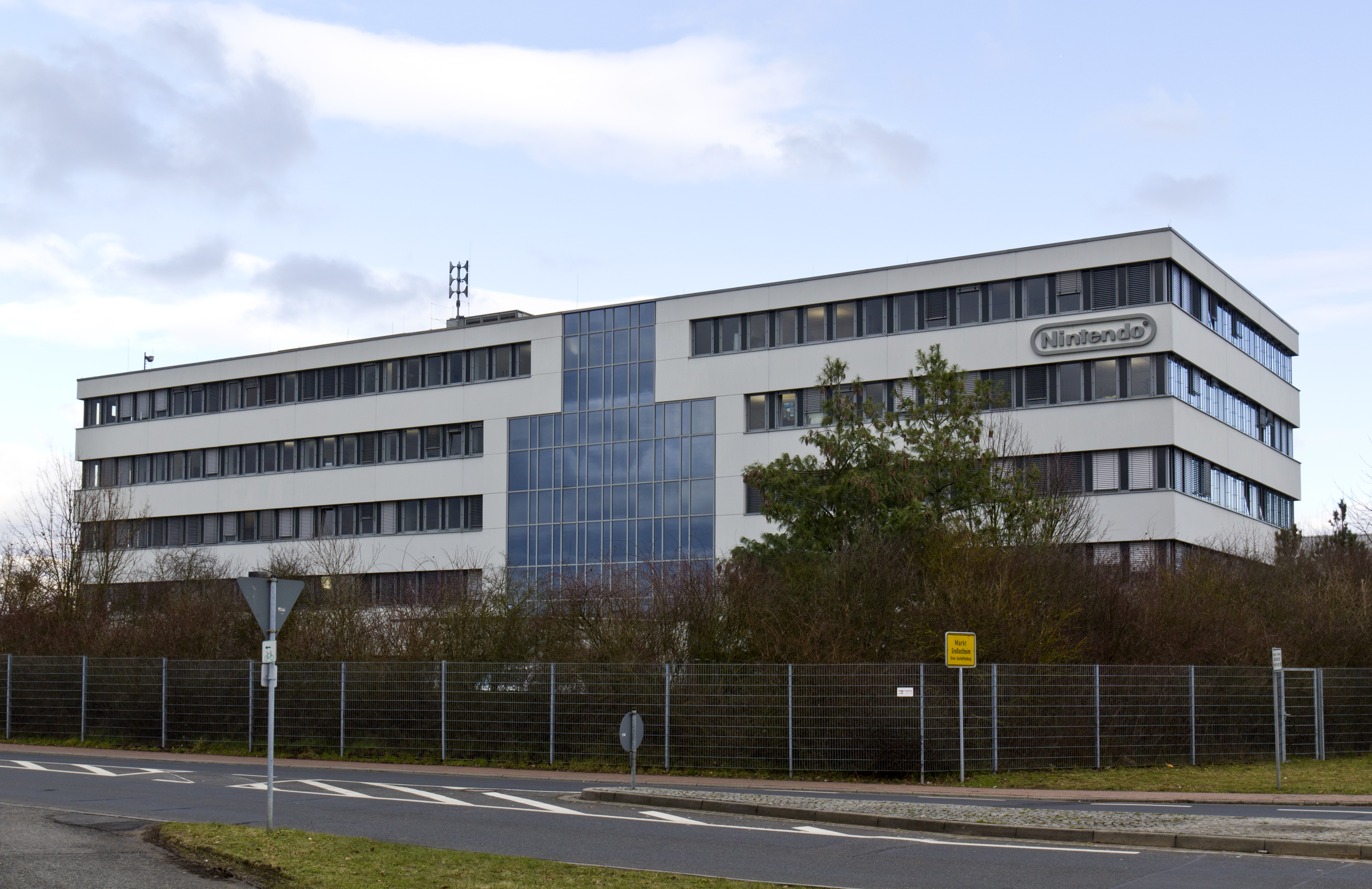
Nintendo of Europe's former head office

=== Economy, agriculture, forestry ===
According to official statistics, in 1998, there were 85 workers on the social welfare contribution rolls working in agriculture and forestry. In producing businesses this was 2,427, and in trade and transport 1,067. In other areas, 910 workers on the social welfare contribution rolls are employed, and 5,627 are remote workers. There were 9 processing businesses. Fourteen businesses are in construction, and furthermore, in 1999, there were 84 agricultural operations with a working area of 2 656 ha, of which 2 428 ha was cropland and 193 ha was meadowland. There are a brewery and several winegrowing operations here.

The best known firm in the municipality was the European head office of Nintendo before its closure and relocation to Frankfurt in 2015. Also, the meat processing business Salomon Foodworld is resident here.

=== Transport ===
Großostheim lies on Bundesstraßen 469 and 26 near Autobahn A 3. In the Gemeindeteil of Ringheim lies a regional airport. Großostheim once had passenger train service, but unfortunately that service ended in 1974 with the closing of the Bachgau railway line. The nearest major railway station is the Aschaffenburg Hauptbahnhof. Bus service to nearby towns, including Aschaffenburg, is available.

=== Education ===
There are the following institutions (as at 2007):

- Kindergartens: 675 kindergarten places with 652 children
- Elementary schools: 5 with 72 teachers and 1,234 pupils

== Famous people ==
=== Sons and daughters of the town ===
- Otto Becker (1958– ), German show jumper
- Heinrich Hock (1887–1971), German chemist
- Prof. Dr. Rudolf Schüßler (1960– ), German (moral) philosopher

=== Town partnerships ===
- Carbon-Blanc, Gironde, France
- Saulxures-sur-Moselotte, Vosges, France
- Hamoir, Liège Province, Belgium
