= Game of Skittles =

Painting by Pieter de Hooch

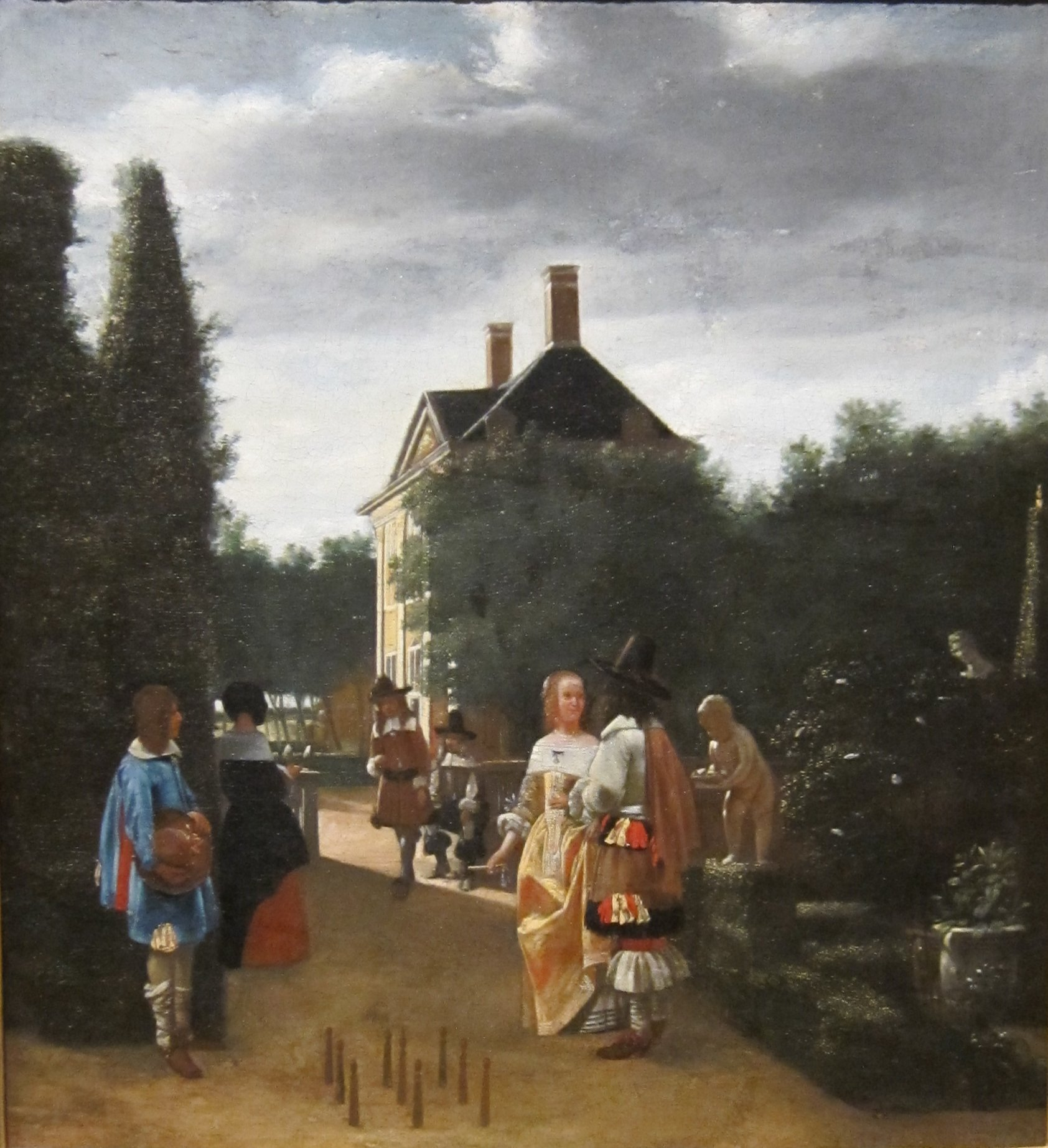
- Artist: Pieter de Hooch
- Year: c. 1665–1668
- Medium: oil on canvas
- Dimensions: 72.1 cm × 66.4 cm (28.4 in × 26.1 in)
- Location: Cincinnati Art Museum; Cincinnati
- Accession: 1950.19

Game of Skittles (c. 1665–1668) is an oil-on-canvas painting by the Dutch painter Pieter de Hooch. It is an example of Dutch Golden Age painting and is part of the Cincinnati Art Museum's collection. The picture was most likely painted around de Hooch's first Amsterdam period, seemingly occurring during the years preceding 1670.

== Description ==
The painting of the skittles players transports the stylish youth depicted in the artist's contemporary interiors to an appropriately grand outdoor setting. Engaged in their sport in a casual manner, they are positioned along a pathway within a formal garden adorned with topiary and statues. In the background, a country house emerges, featuring a monumentally ordered facade that may be a fanciful reduction inspired by recent classical architectural projects, such as Van Campen's Mauritshuis or Vingboon's Trippenhuis. During this period, affluent Amsterdam families, likely emulating the aristocracy, constructed summer homes, predominantly along the Amstel and Vecht rivers. Reflecting the trend of cityscapes, artists like Van der Heyden specialized in portraying well-known country houses and their surrounding gardens. Imaginary country villas were also a recurring element in the tradition of idealized garden party scenes within genre painting. De Hooch's painting, along with later works like those of Dejongh, forms a connection in this tradition, extending from medieval love gardens to the Fête champêtre of the eighteenth century. Similar to de Hooch's early 1660s interiors, certain aspects of the composition evoke earlier spatial designs, notably resembling Van Hoogstraten's portrait of 1647. However, the work avoids succumbing to the otherworldly abstraction found in the renditions of this theme by the De Vriesian painters.

In the foreground's center, the ninepins are arranged. On the right side, a lady and a gentleman engage in conversation; the lady wears a yellow silk attire, while the gentleman, facing away from the observer, is attired in light grey and wears a slouch hat. Positioned to the left is another gentleman, in a light blue outfit accented with red, holding his hat beneath his arm; behind him stands a lady in a black jacket and an orange skirt, her back turned to the viewer. To the right lies a stone cupid figure; trees provide a backdrop. On the left, tall manicured hedges allow a gentle light to filter through. In the middle distance, a sunlit mansion takes center stage, with a trellised arbor in front containing two cavaliers. One cavalier has just entered, while the other, seated, appears to have been an after thought of de Hooch, allowing the lines of the architecture to be visible through his figure.

== Copies ==
The artist's particular interest in the subject is evident, given that he painted it on three separate occasions. These variations exhibit minor distinctions in detail and colour, consistent with the fastidious approach characteristic of de Hooch. Such refinements were likely introduced in an effort to enhance each subsequent creation while preserving the overall effect; typical of an artist like de Hooch, who painted with meticulous care. The later Waddesdon copy is said to be much more elaborate in the finish, including additions of a pot, containing poppies and lillies placed near the shrubbery on the left, enhancing the overall effect of the piece.

== Ownership ==
=== Cincinnati Version ===
- Gift of Mary Hanna to the Cincinnati Art Museum.

=== St. Louis Version ===
- (Possibly) In Amsterdam, April 26, 1769; but that was said to have different measurements.
- Smith viewed the painting in 1829 in the collection of Thomas Emmerson of London.
- Thomas Emmerson sold the painting on May 1 of the same year.
- The artwork then appeared in the collection of Paul Perrier in Paris.
- In the catalogue of Perrier's collection (Paris, March 16-17, 1843), the painting is mentioned as having previously belonged to the Duke of Marlborough.
- In 1866, the painting was exhibited at the Palais des Champs-Elysees under ownership of the Marquis de Colbert-Chabannais.
- Eventually, the artwork passed to the granddaughter of the Marquis de Colbert-Chabannais, the Comtesse de L'Aigle.
- With Wildenstein, New York, 1929, from whom purchased by the Saint Louis Art Museum.
- Sold by the museum at auction to benefit the acquisitions fund in 2003.

=== Waddesdon Version ===
- George Morant sale by Phillips on May 19, 1832, lot no. 113, purchased for 210 guineas.
- Possibly held in a private collection in Amsterdam.
- Acquired by John Walter at Bearwood before 1856.
- Later obtained by Baron Ferdinand de Rothschild from Walter, around 1894 or shortly thereafter.
- Inherited by Baron Ferdinand de Rothschild's sister, Alice de Rothschild.
- Further inherited by Alice's great-nephew, James de Rothschild.
- Finally bequeathed to Waddesdon (National Trust) in 1957.

== See also ==
- List of Paintings by Pieter de Hooch
- Dutch Golden Age painting
- Game of Skittles (St.Louis version) at Christie's.
