= Skittle Players outside an Inn =

Oil on oak panel painting by the Dutch artist Jan Steen

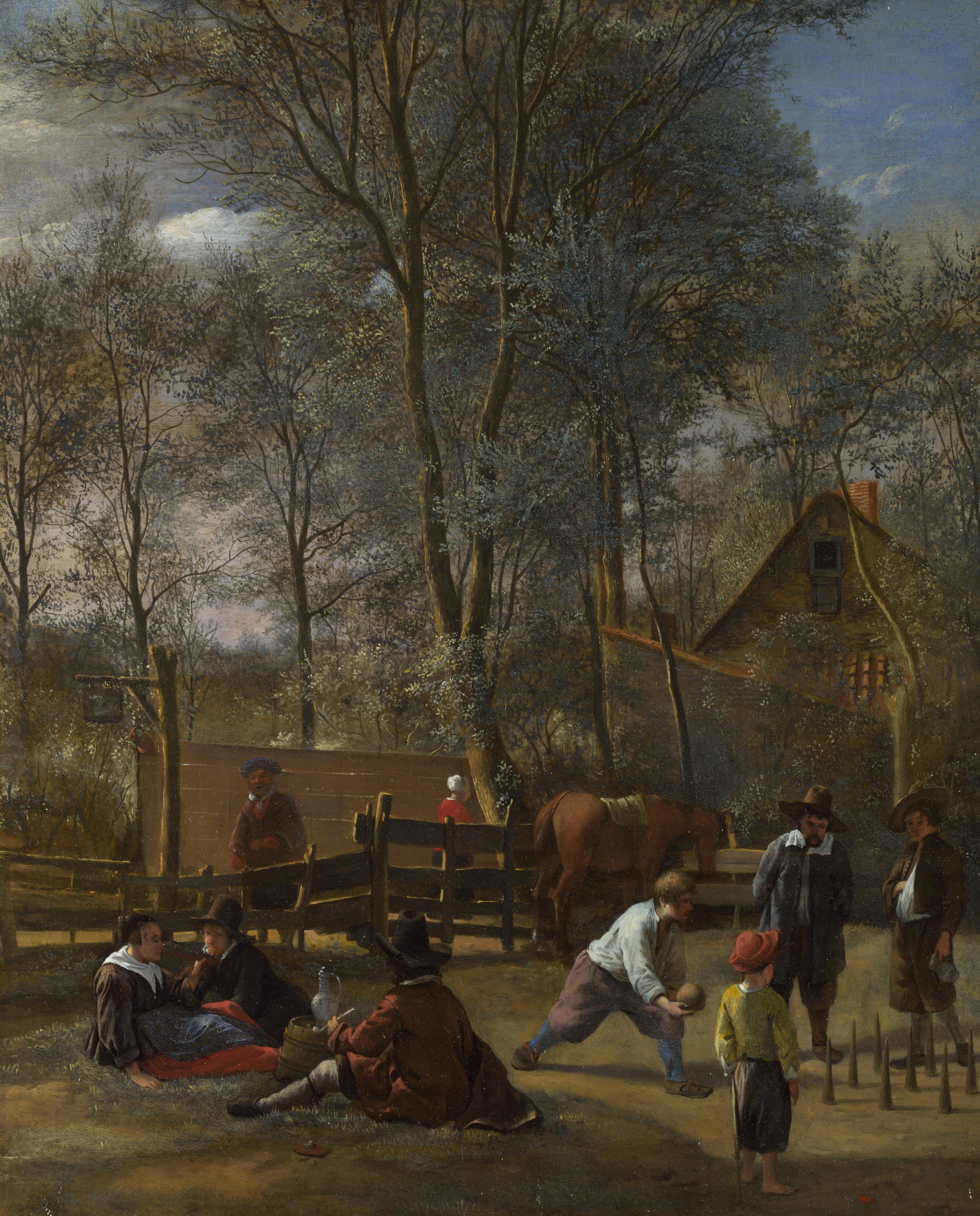

Skittle Players outside an Inn is an oil-on-oak-panel painting by the Dutch artist Jan Steen, probably painted between 1660 and 1663 during his time in Haarlem. It depicts the playing of a skittles game, and is now in the National Gallery, London, to which it was bequeathed in 1910 by George Salting.

== Sources ==
- https://www.nationalgallery.org.uk/paintings/jan-steen-skittle-players-outside-an-inn
