= Skittles (sport) =

Old European lawn game

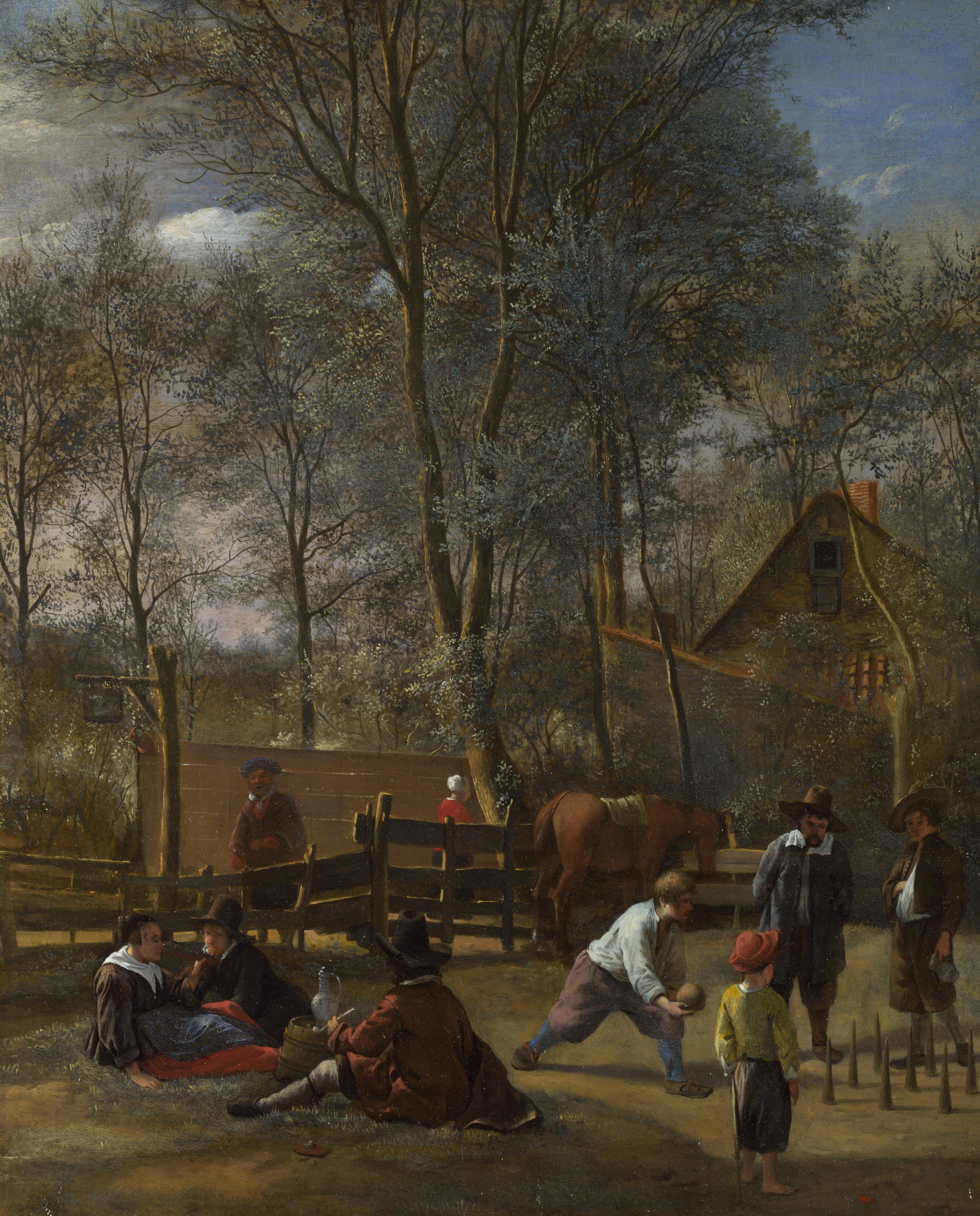
Skittle Players outside an Inn by Jan Steen

Skittles is a lawn game and target sport played in the United Kingdom and Ireland in which a ball is thrown at a set of nine wooden pins, usually arranged in a diamond formation, in an attempt to knock them over in as few throws as possible. It is of European origin, and variations of the game are still played in many other countries, such as quilles in France, kegeln in Germany and Austria, and bolos and Asturian bowling in Spain. It is similar to, but distinct from, nine-pin bowling and is considered the forerunner of Tenpin bowling, which is typically thought to have made its way to the United States with Dutch colonists.

== Etymology ==
The etymology of the name is uncertain. The earliest known usage of the word in English is 1634. It phonetically matches the Danish and Swedish word skyttel, meaning 'shuttle, marble, moveable bar in a gateway', but no evidence has been found between these words and the game of skittles.. In 1801 Joseph Strutt suggested that the word for a skittle evolved from the French quille and appeared in English first as kayle, and that kayle-pins then becames known as kittle-pins and eventually skittle-pins. However, although the form 'kittle-pin' does appear in the 17th century, it postdates the usage of 'skittle'. Kayle first appears in records in 1325.

The origin of Kayle is also uncertain. It corresponds to Middle Dutch keghel, kegel, the Old High German chegil, and the Middle High German and German kegel. The French quille (recorded in use in 1320) is generally thought to have come from the Germanic word.

== Playing ==
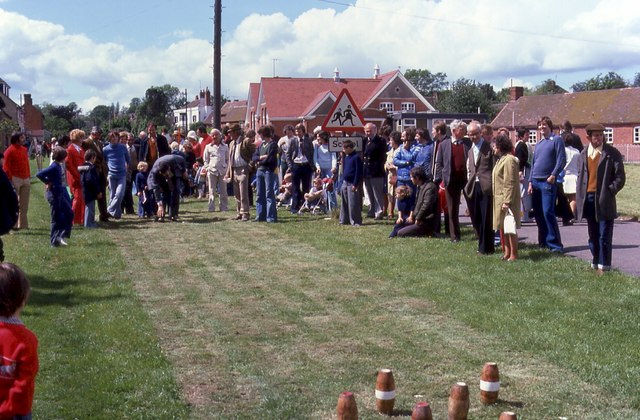
Traditional lawn skittles, played in Twyning Green, England, with pins resembling short candlepins

Skittles is usually played indoors on a bowling alley, with one or more heavy balls, usually spherical but sometimes oblate, and several (most commonly nine) skittles, or small bowling pins. The general object of the game is to use the ball(s) to knock over the skittles, either specific ones or all of them, depending upon game variant. Exact rules vary widely on a regional basis.

The Irish game is played with five 3-inch-high (76 mm) pins and three 9-inch-high (230 mm) pieces of wood (skittles). Pins are numbered from 1 to 5, each representing a number of points. Throwers must toss the skittles towards the pins over a distance of approximately 8 metres (26 ft) in order to score points with the aim to scoring exactly 41. Points are recorded in descending order. If a player should score too many points ("go bust") they return to a score of 9 left, unless their previous score was above this in which case they return to that score.

In the United Kingdom many regional variations exist. They are chiefly characterised by differences in the size of teams, how many 'legs' are played, how many balls a 'leg' consists of, and the scoring of points. Further regional differences involve variations in the weight, size, and materials from which the pins are made. In some variations a specific pin – often known as the 'Kingpin' – must be knocked over before a throw can be scored.

In the Worcestershire variant all balls must touch the Alley before the 'Line' to be deemed as legal. However the 'Linesman' (a member of the opposing team who sits and watches the line) must call 'Over' before the ball strikes a pin. If they fail to do this, the pins felled will count. All pins are 'live' until they land in the pit behind the diamond, or leave the alley on an open side. They can rebound off a side wall back into the diamond taking down other pin(s). If a ball hits the cush (the rails on either side of the alley), or wall or passes through the diamond and bounces back out of the pit before felling pins the frame must be reset.

In Dorset some games are played by bowling a technique known as the 'Dorset flop', in which the bowler crouches on the alley and throws themselves and the ball forward, landing on their stomach and letting the ball go between two bowling lines. In some parts of Somerset the ball has to hit a pitch plate (a diamond painted on the alley) in order for it to be a legal ball. This style is also popular in South Wales.

=== Rules variations ===
(Note: See Glossary below for explanation of named pins)

==== Front pin first ====
Also known as King Pin. Pins are counted only if the front pin is knocked over first. If the front pin is missed, any pins that are knocked over are not reset. In Devon Summer League, this rule is played frequently. In Bristol, this is the form of the game played and "all in" skittles tends to be looked down upon as involving less skill.

==== Nomination ====
The player must nominate the pin that will be hit first before they throw the ball. Unless this pin is knocked over, the player will not score. The names given to the pins may vary from region to region; in Wiltshire they are usually referred to as "front pin", "front right quarter", "front left quarter", "outside right" (or "right winger"), "centre pin", "outside left" (or "left winger"), "back right quarter", "back left quarter", and "back pin".

==== Four-pins ====
In this variant of the game, only four pins (the two coppers and the front and back pins) are put up and must be hit with the front pin first. It is often used in conjunction with nomination as well. It is currently used in North Somerset Cup games.

==== London Bridge ====
A variant of nomination but with only the landlord and two coppers set up, i.e. one has to hit a pin with each ball and nominate which one each time.

==== Killer, Coffins, or German skittles ====
A game for any number of people. Each starts with three lives. Each bowls only one ball at a time. The first bowls at a full frame and the skittles are not stuck up until all nine are hit down. Each time a player fails to hit at least one pin, they lose a life. The winner is the last one left with a life intact. Usually played for small amounts of money, the winner takes the combined player entry fees (typically £1 or 50p per game each). It is found in the Wiltshire, Somerset, and Bristol areas. Players might claim a "tactical miss" when they have multiple lives remaining and fail to hit the only pin still standing. This is to avoid giving the following player a full frame.

==== Six-ball Westbury ====
Another game for any number of people. Each player has one hand of six balls at a full frame. If all nine pins are knocked down within the hand, then they are reset, meaning that a player may score anywhere between 0 and 54. The winner is the player with the highest score. It is similar to killer in that it is usually played for money with the winner taking the pot.

London Skittles alley in the basement of the Freemasons Arms in Hampstead, North London.

==== London Skittles ====
London Skittles games are usually played over seven ends (legs). Competition matches are usually played over twenty-one ends. Games are played one-against-one, a chalk (a point) being scored by knocking all the pins over in fewer throws than one's opponent. It is assumed that a player can get a single pin, so any standing pins each count as an extra throw. If the pins aren't all down in four throws, five is scored. The order of play alternates - player A sets for player B then player B sets for player A and so on.

Once widespread across the British capital, it went into decline following the Second World War and is now only played at the Freemasons Arms in Hampstead.

==== Twenty ones ====
This is played for money at the end of an evening of London Skittles. Players have one throw per turn and score the number of pins knocked down. The winner is the first player to reach exactly twenty one. If a player goes bust, their score goes back to twelve.

== Glossary ==
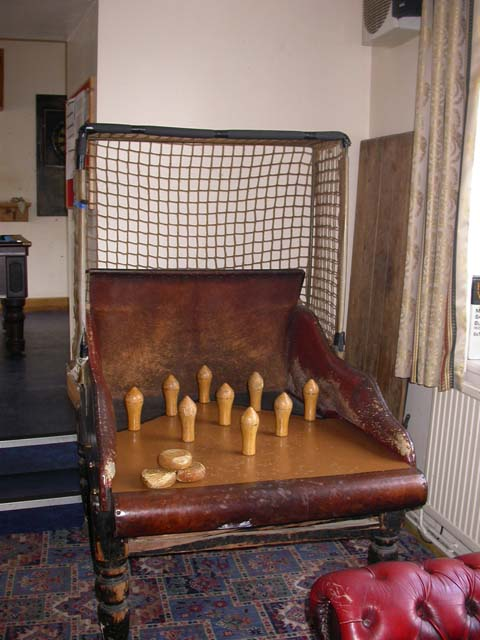
A traditional pub game in Oundle, North Northamptonshire, England

- Anchor Man – the last player to throw in each leg. Likely chosen for their ability to score highly under pressure.
- Backboard – a small optional plank behind the player and/or playing mat- some players like to rest their heels on it during play.
- Ball – the wooden or rubber ball rolled at the skittles.
- Broken frame – a frame with some pins knocked over.
- Cheese – a round, flattened wooden discus (often made of lignum vitae), with a similar shape to some types of cheese wheels. It can be rolled, but in some variants of the game is thrown instead. It is particular used in deck skittles.
- Chute – see Trough.
- Cush – the rails on either side of the alley, usually made from timber. Some alleys have ditches/gutters instead (similar to ten pin bowling).
- Cush ball – a ball that is bowled and hits the cush. In most variants of the game the pins that are then knocked down are not counted in the players score.
- Cut – when the ball hits the side of a pin.
- Ditch – an area behind the pins that has been dug into the floor. It catches the pins that are knocked down.
- Dorset flop – a way in throwing in which the player throws “double handed” by throwing themselves off of the backboard into a press-up position.
- Down – the scores for all players in one set during a single hand, combined.
- Duck – a player's score when they doesn't knock down any pins on their turn.
- Flattener – same as strike, flopper or floorer (q.v.).
- Flopper – when a player knocks down all nine pins with one ball or cheese.
- Foul – a ball delivered illegally over the foul line.
- Frame – the full set of pins (usually nine) standing upright.
- Hand – a player's turn at the game.
- King pin – the name of a variant skittles in which front pin has to be floored before any pins count.
- Line: the mark on the alley that denotes where the ball must be delivered (e.g. before the line, in-between two lines, etc.)
- Linesman – a member of the opposing side tasked with watching the Line for foul balls.
- Leg: – the team of players. Also referred to as a set.
- No Ball – same as foul.
- Over – same as foul.
- Pit – same as Ditch.
- Pitch – the long rectangular strip along which balls are thrown and at the end of which the pins stand.
- Plate – the strip on the floor which the balls have to hit when they leave the skittlers' hands.
- Set – same as leg
- Sidey – a ball played that hits the side of the alley.
- Skittle alley – a long narrow building in which skittles is usually played.
- Spare – when a player knocks down all nine pins with 2 balls, allowing a third throw with the pins re-set.
- Split – the pins left after the first ball has been played.
- Spot – The marks on the plate which the pins are placed.
- Sticker or sticker-up – a person who puts knocked-over pins back upright.
- Strike – hitting over all the pins on first throw.
- Trough – a feature on most skittle alleys (constructed out of wood or plastic with a slope) that is used by the sticker-up to return the balls to the players end of the alley for the next go.
- Wide – A ball that misses the diamond on either side.

== Table skittles ==
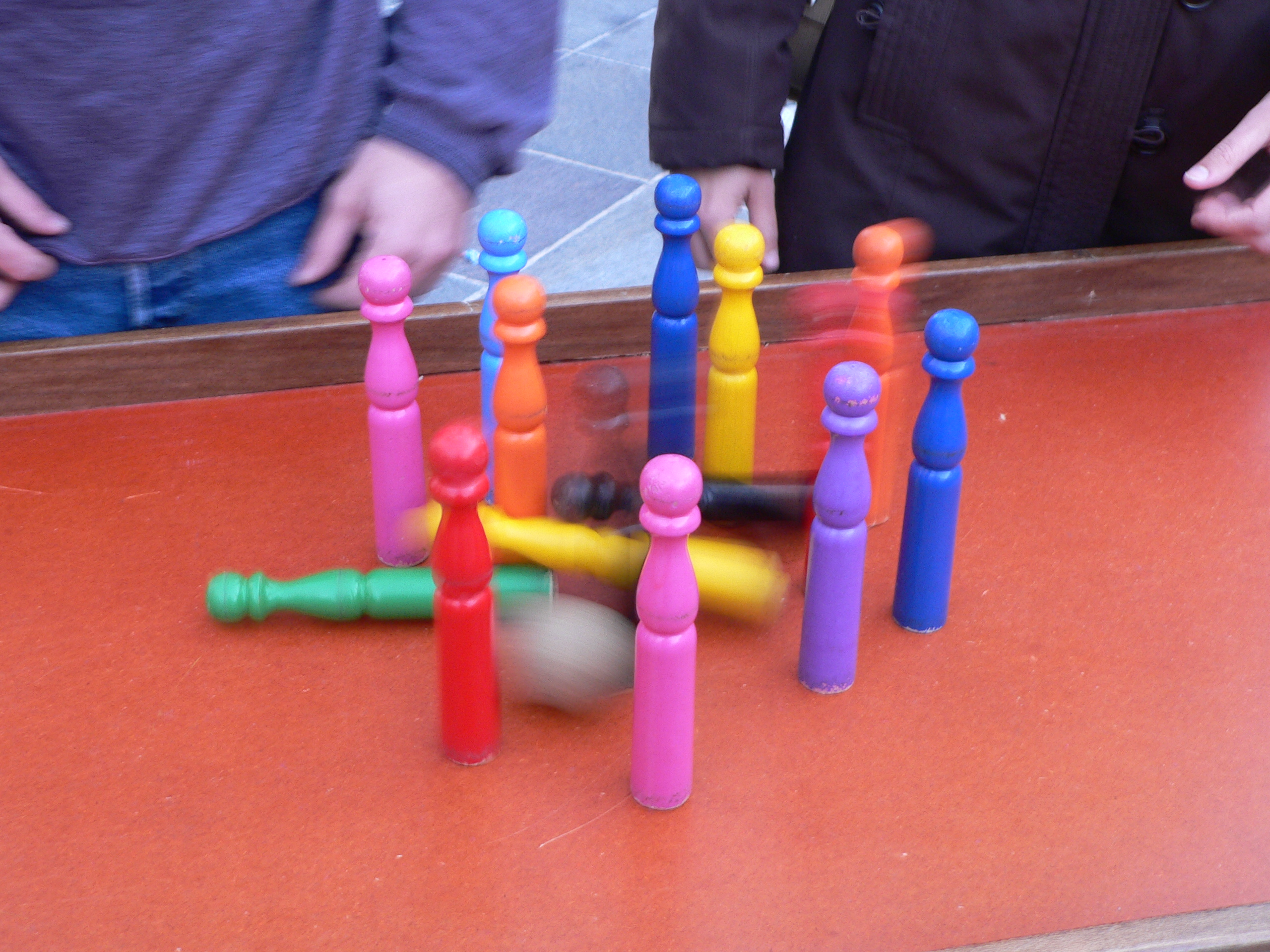
A variety of table skittles

Table-top versions of the game also exist. These include:

- Northamptonshire Table Skittles, also known as Cheese Skittles or Hood Skittles: a miniaturized version in which the pins are on a special table which is closed on three sides with a leather hood; a 'cheese' is thrown at the pins from a distance of around 8 feet. Most commonly the goal is to fell more pins than the opposite team. Matches are played over seven legs.
- Daddlums: used to be popular throughout counties in the south-east of England, but later mostly in Kent. Unlike Northamptonshire Table Skittles, the Daddlums table is a scaled-down version of Long Alley skittles.
- Devil among the tailors: another miniaturized version, in which a small ball is attached by a chain or string to a vertical pole, allowing it to be swung through the air in an arc to strike the pins. This game is seen in the British television period drama series Downton Abbey in episode 2.3. The game is seen being played in the library scene before dinner. A 10-pin version of this game was produced by Aurora Plastics and was sold in the United States under the name "Skittle Bowl".

== Scattles and smite ==
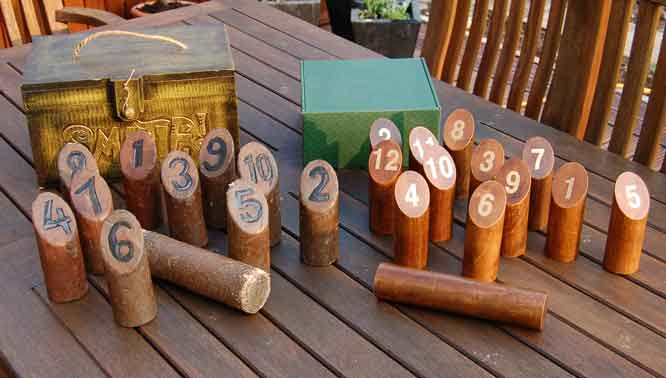
Scattles & Smite

Scattles is a version of skittles in which all the pins are numbered. Players take turn in throwing the baton at the pins with a view to totalling exactly 50 points. If more than one pin is knocked over, the score received is that quantity of pins. But if only one pin is knocked over, the value on it is scored. If a player exceeds 50, their total reduces to 25. Pins are then placed upright where they stand, thus scattering. Scattles is made by Jaques of London and reminiscent of the older Cornish game, smite, itself based on the Finnish skittles game mölkky.

== Cultural references ==
Skittles is referenced in many works of Charles Dickens, often by way of comparison or more directly in the actions of characters.

The phrase "beer and skittles" refers to indulgently spending one's time at a pub, drinking and playing the game, and by extension any indulgent, irresponsible lifestyle choice.

A table-top version of the game is also featured in the first season of the Netflix series Easy, specifically episode seven. It also features in the episode "Therapy" (season 2, episode 8) of Malcolm in the Middle.

A game of London skittles can be seen played in the film The Water Gipsies.

== See also ==
- Game of Skittles (c. 1665–1668) is an oil-on-canvas painting by the Dutch painter Pieter de Hooch.
