= Devil among the tailors =

English pub game

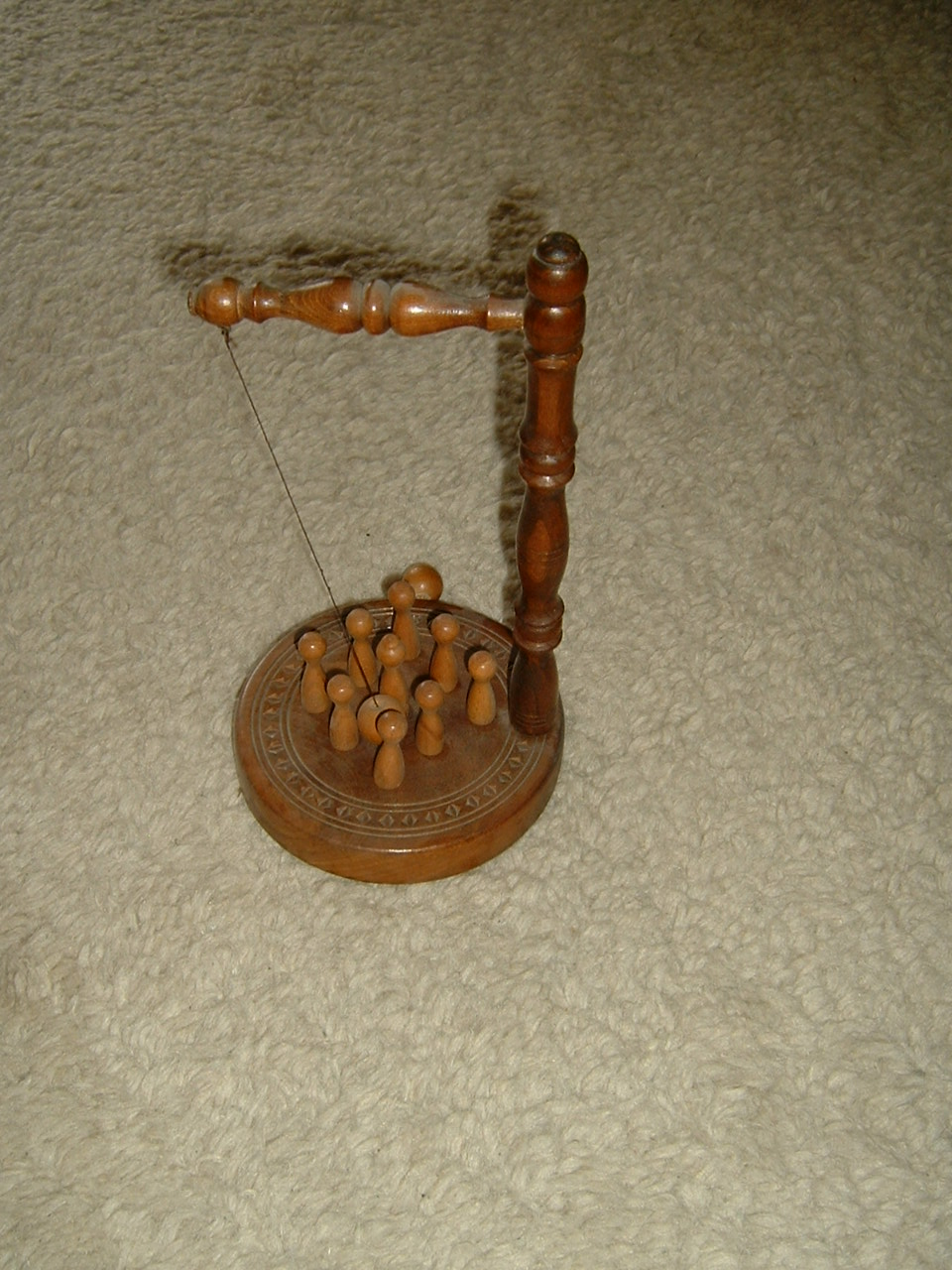
Children's version of the game

Devil among the tailors is a form of table skittles which is usually found as a pub game in England. It is likely that the game emerged between 1675 and 1783 and surged in popularity during the 1920s and 1930s before waning again. Today it is found in scattered pockets across most of the country.

== Description ==
The game involves nine small skittles arranged in a 3 × 3 square, usually on a raised plinth within a shallow open-topped wooden tray, about 2 x 2½ feet in size, sitting on a table-top. A cribbage board often forms part of the tray and is used for keeping score.

The wooden ball (about the size of a golf ball) hangs from a string or chain attached to the top of a vertical wooden post rising from one corner of the box or one-third of the way along one side. The top of the post swivels to allow the ball to swing freely. The aim of the game is to knock down the skittles by swinging the ball in an arc round the post (rather than aiming directly at the skittles).

It is also the name of a game in which each player spins a spinning top with a string, to knock down skittles, earning points for doing so. This game is quite a large table game, around 1M × 1.5 M. The game may be referred to as "De'il Among the Tailors" in Scotland. An example of this game is on display in Osterley Manor in London.

The game can be seen in a pub setting in the Beatles film A Hard Day's Night at the 1 hour 4 minute mark. Ringo goes AWOL from a gig and ends up annoying people playing various pub games. It is also featured in the Malcolm in the Middle episode "Therapy," in which Dewey exhibits a surprising talent for the game.

== Name origins ==
On 15 August 1805, a play called The Tailors: A Tragedy for Warm Weather, starring William Dowton, was presented at the theatre, then known as The Little Theatre in the Hay. The London tailors took exception to this satire on their craft, and thousands rioted, both inside and outside the theatre. The special constables were helpless against the overwhelming odds, so a troop of Life Guards was called. Sixteen prisoners were taken and the rest dispersed. The Life Guards did their job so effectively that it was likened to a skittle ball ploughing through the skittles. Thereafter, the game of Table Skittles (or Bar Skittles) was often referred to as ‘Devil Among the Tailors’ (or Devil Among the Tailors).

Fairburn's edition of the play is entitled The Devil among the Tailors, it includes an account of the event. The event also inspired a popular Scottish country dance, The Deil Amang the Tailors, published in 1801.

In the picturesque name, the 'devil' refers to the ball and the 'tailors' are the skittles.

== Sources ==
- Finn, Timothy: Pub Games of England. Cambridge: Oleander.
- Foote, Samuel (1836). The Tailors (or "Quadrupeds"), a Tragedy for Warm Weather. London: Unwin.
