= Interior with a Mother Close to a Cradle =

Painting by Pieter de Hooch

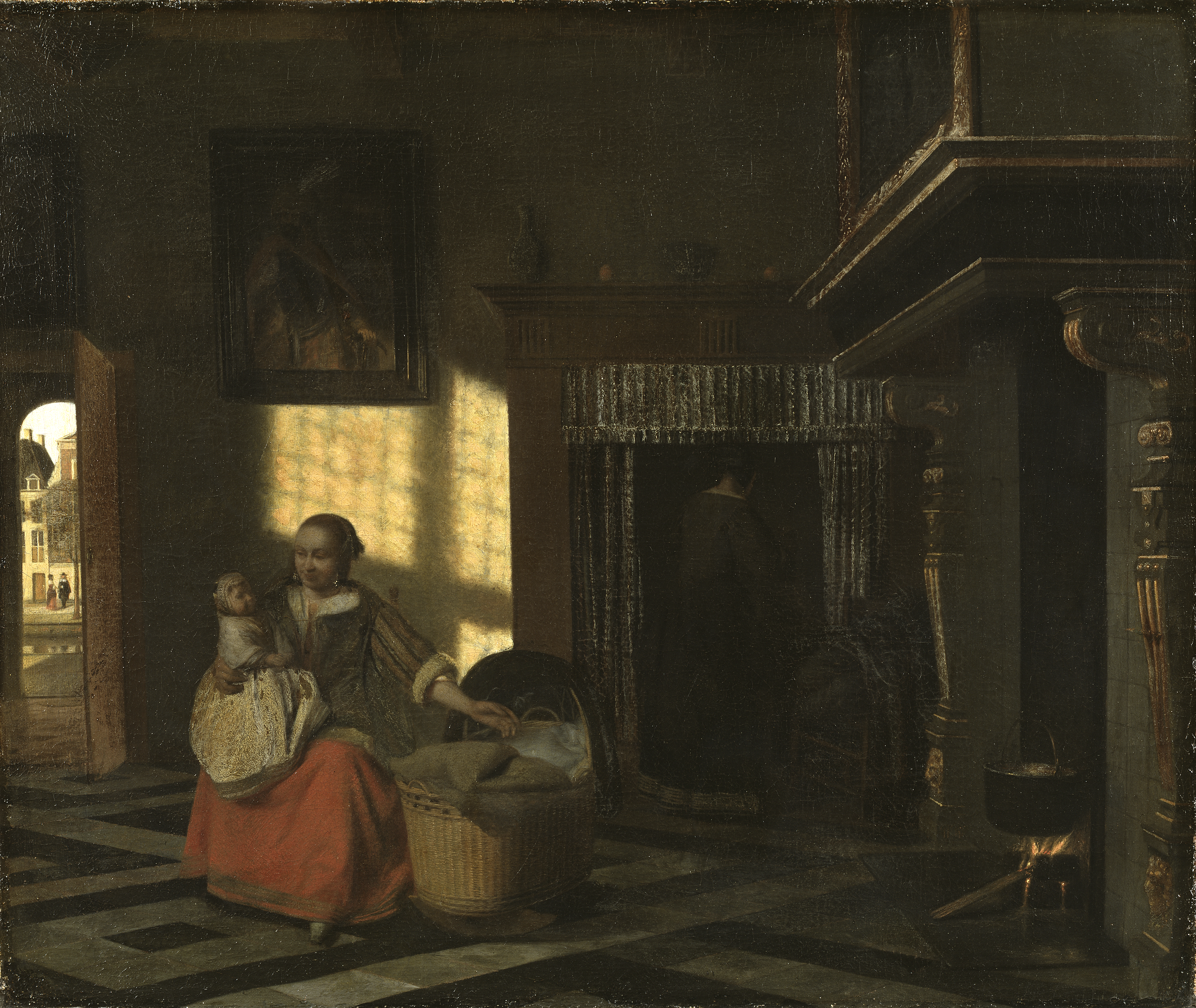
- Artist: Pieter de Hooch
- Year: c. 1665–1670
- Medium: oil on canvas
- Dimensions: 54 cm × 65 cm (21 in × 26 in)
- Location: Nationalmuseum; Stockholm

Interior with a Mother Close to a Cradle is an oil-on-canvas painting by the Dutch painter Pieter de Hooch, created c. 1665–1670. It is part of the collection of the Nationalmuseum, Stockholm.

This painting was documented by Hofstede de Groot in 1910, who wrote:

13. MOTHER BESIDE A CRADLE. deG. 83. This represents a dark room, partly illumined by sunlight, which streams through the window, and is reflected in the tiles of the floor. A young mother

sits with her little girl on her lap, and points with her left hand to the cradle standing beside her. The woman wears a red skirt, the girl a yellow skirt. To the right is the fireplace; beside it is a four-post bed, at which a servant-maid is busy. The open door gives a clear view of a street beside a canal. It is almost the same composition as the picture formerly in the Van der Hoop collection (2). It is dark, unattractive, and late.

Signed indistinctly "P.D. HOO"; canvas, 21 inches by 26 inches. Mentioned in an inventory of 1816. Now in the National Museum at Stockholm, No. 473 in the 1900 catalogue.

- 13a. Picture with a Woman and Child. Sale. Amsterdam, April II, 1698 (Hoet, i. 43), No. 20 (21 florins).
- 13b. A Woman laying a Child in a Cradle, in an Interior. Sale. Dav. letswaart, in Amsterdam, April 22, 1749 (Hoet, ii. 250), No. 191 (16 florins 10).
- Compare the picture in Fleischmann collection (8).

== See also ==
- List of paintings by Pieter de Hooch
