= Two Soldiers and a Serving Woman with a Trumpeter =

Painting by Pieter de Hooch

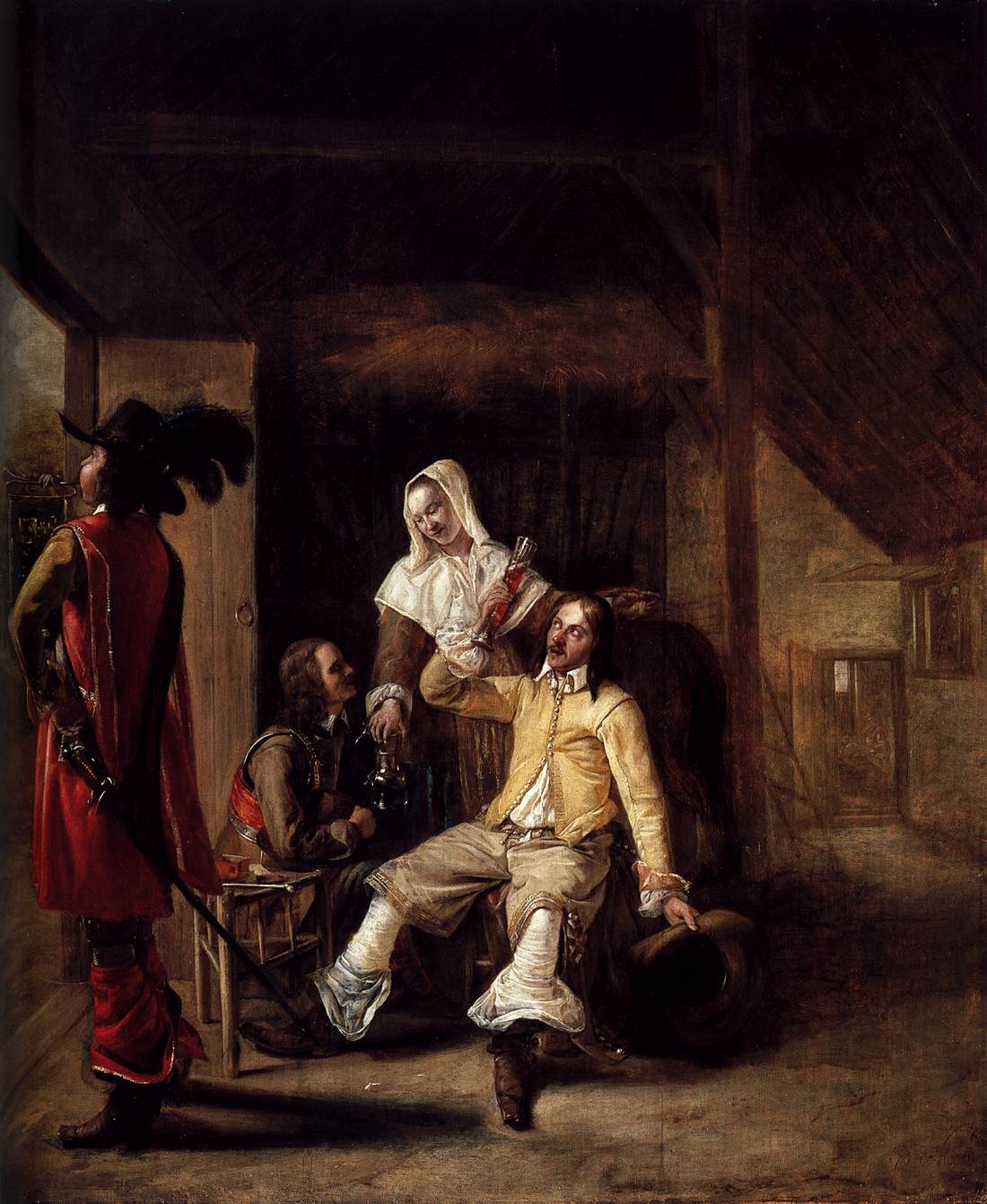
- Artist: Pieter de Hooch
- Year: c. 1650–1655
- Medium: oil on canvas
- Dimensions: 76 cm × 66 cm (30 in × 26 in)
- Location: Kunsthaus Zürich; Zürich

Two Soldiers and a Serving Woman with a Trumpeter (c. 1650–1655) is an oil-on-canvas painting by the Dutch painter Pieter de Hooch. It is an example of Dutch Golden Age painting and is now in the collection of the Kunsthaus Zürich, in Switzerland.

The painting was documented by Hofstede de Groot in 1908, who wrote: "278. Officers resting in a Stable. Two jovial officers are resting in a stable. A comely woman offers them a jug of wine. At the door stands a trumpeter blowing his trumpet. Through an open door at the back are seen people at play. Panel, 30 inches by 26 inches. Sales. H. A. Bauer and others, Amsterdam, September 11, 1820, No. 55 (61 florins, Meusardt). P. J. de Marneffe, Brussels, May 22, 1830, No. 148."

This scene is very similar to other paintings De Hooch made in this period:

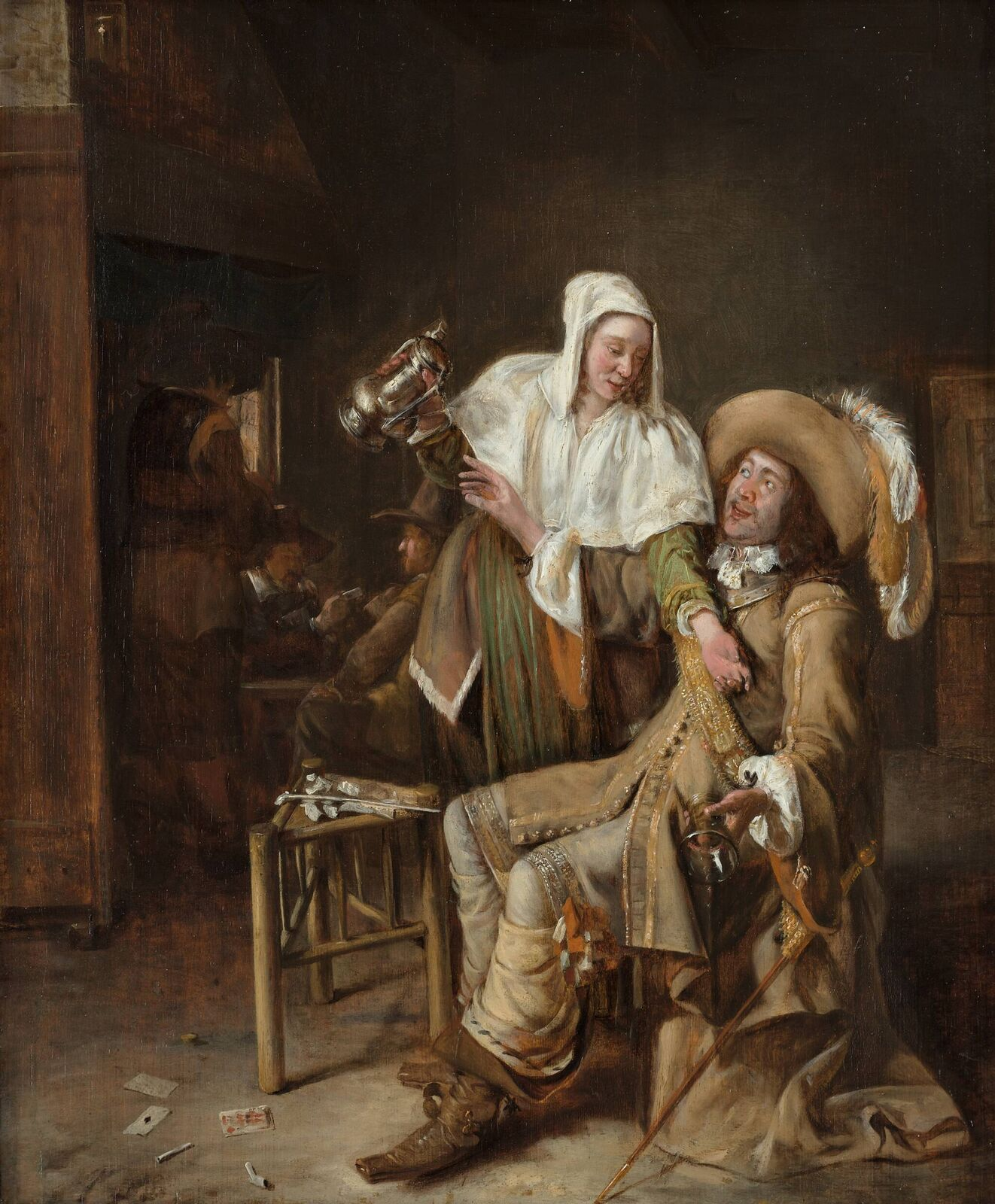
The Empty Glass

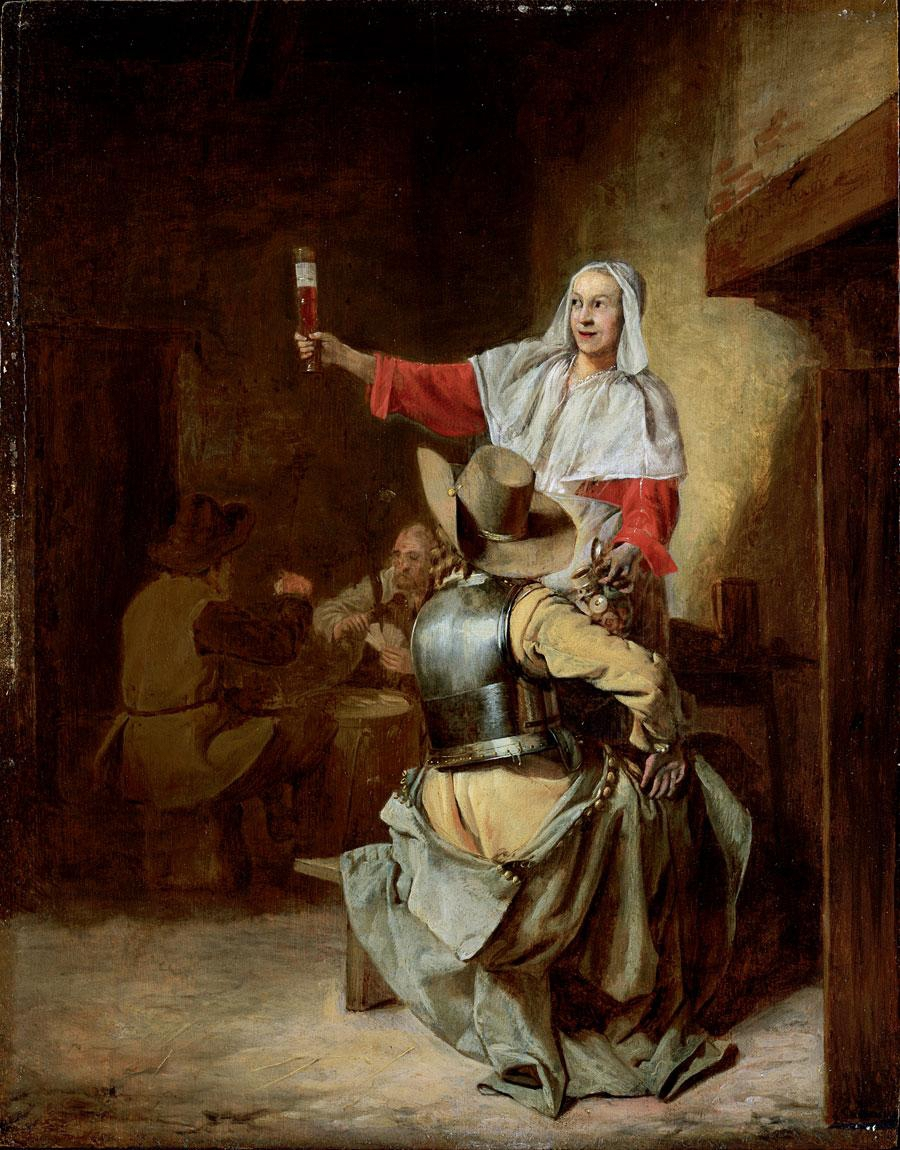
Tavern interior soldiers and a serving woman

== See also ==
- List of paintings by Pieter de Hooch
