= Mother with a Child and a Chambermaid =

Painting by Pieter de Hooch

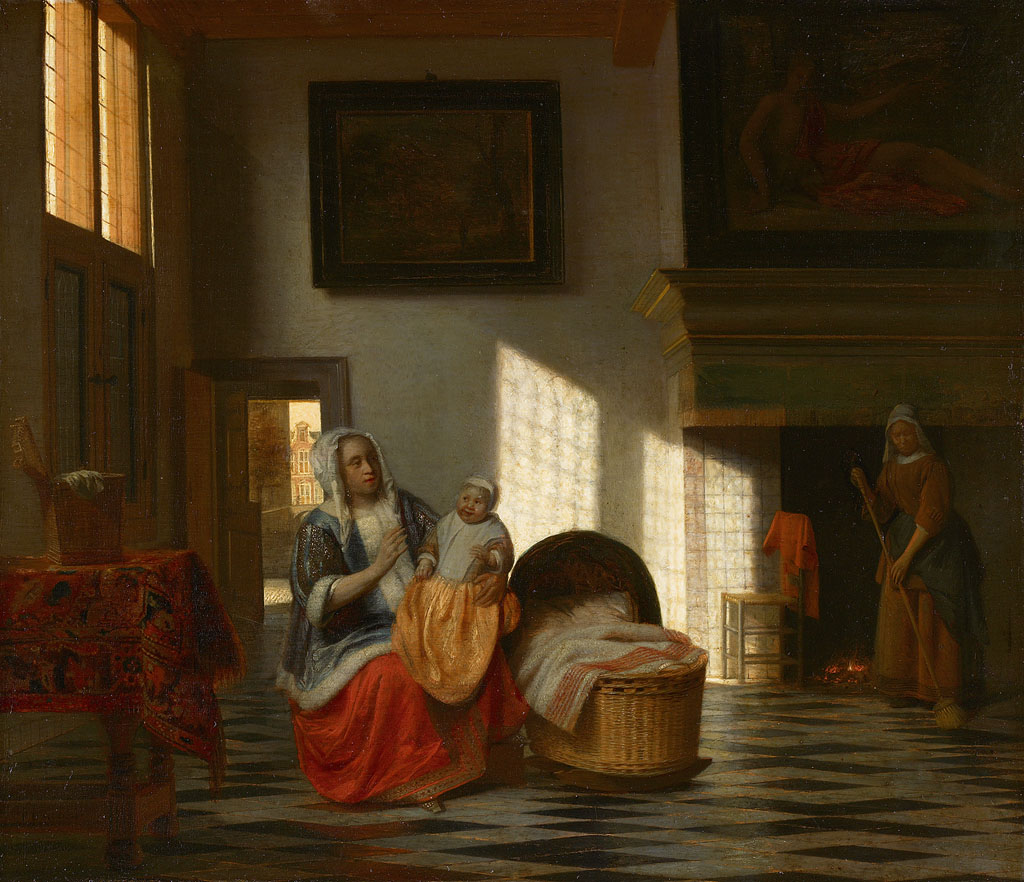
- Artist: Pieter de Hooch
- Year: 1665–1668
- Medium: oil on canvas
- Dimensions: 37 cm × 42 cm (14.5 in × 16.5 in)
- Location: Amsterdam Museum; Amsterdam

Mother with a Child and a Chambermaid (1665–1668) is an oil-on-canvas painting by the Dutch painter Pieter de Hooch. It is an example of Dutch Golden Age painting and is part of the collection of the Amsterdam Museum.

This was the second de Hooch painting documented by Hofstede de Groot in 1908, who wrote:

2. MOTHER WITH A CHILD AND A CHAMBERMAID. Sm. 31 and Suppl. 12; deG. 4. To the left, but near the centre of the picture, sits a woman, holding a little child on her lap with her left hand. She wears a blue jacket trimmed with fur and a red skirt; at her right is a wicker cradle. Farther back, to the right of the fireplace, a chambermaid is sweeping the tiled floor. Bright sunlight falls from the window high up on the left, and illumines the back wall, on which hangs a picture. Another picture hangs over the fireplace; below is a chair. In the left foreground is a table with a cloth, upon which is a basket. The open door at the back shows a view of a canal with a stone bridge and a sunlit house.

Signed "P. D. HOOCH"; oak panel, 14 1/2 inches by 16 1/2 inches. A replica is in the Stockholm Museum. Sales:

- P. Locquet, in Amsterdam, September 22, 1783, No. 139 (355 florins, Delfos).
- Jurriaans, August 28, 1817 (990 florins, De Vries).
- G. Schimmelpenninck, in Amsterdam, July 12, 1819, No. 40 (799 florins, De Vries).
- Amsterdam, May 14, 1832, No. 37 (925 florins, De Vries).
- In the Van der Hoop collection, 1842 (Sm.).

Now in the Rijksmuseum at Amsterdam, No. 1252 in the 1903 catalogue (formerly No. 684).

== See also ==
- List of paintings by Pieter de Hooch
