= Hendrick van der Burgh =

Dutch Golden Age genre painter

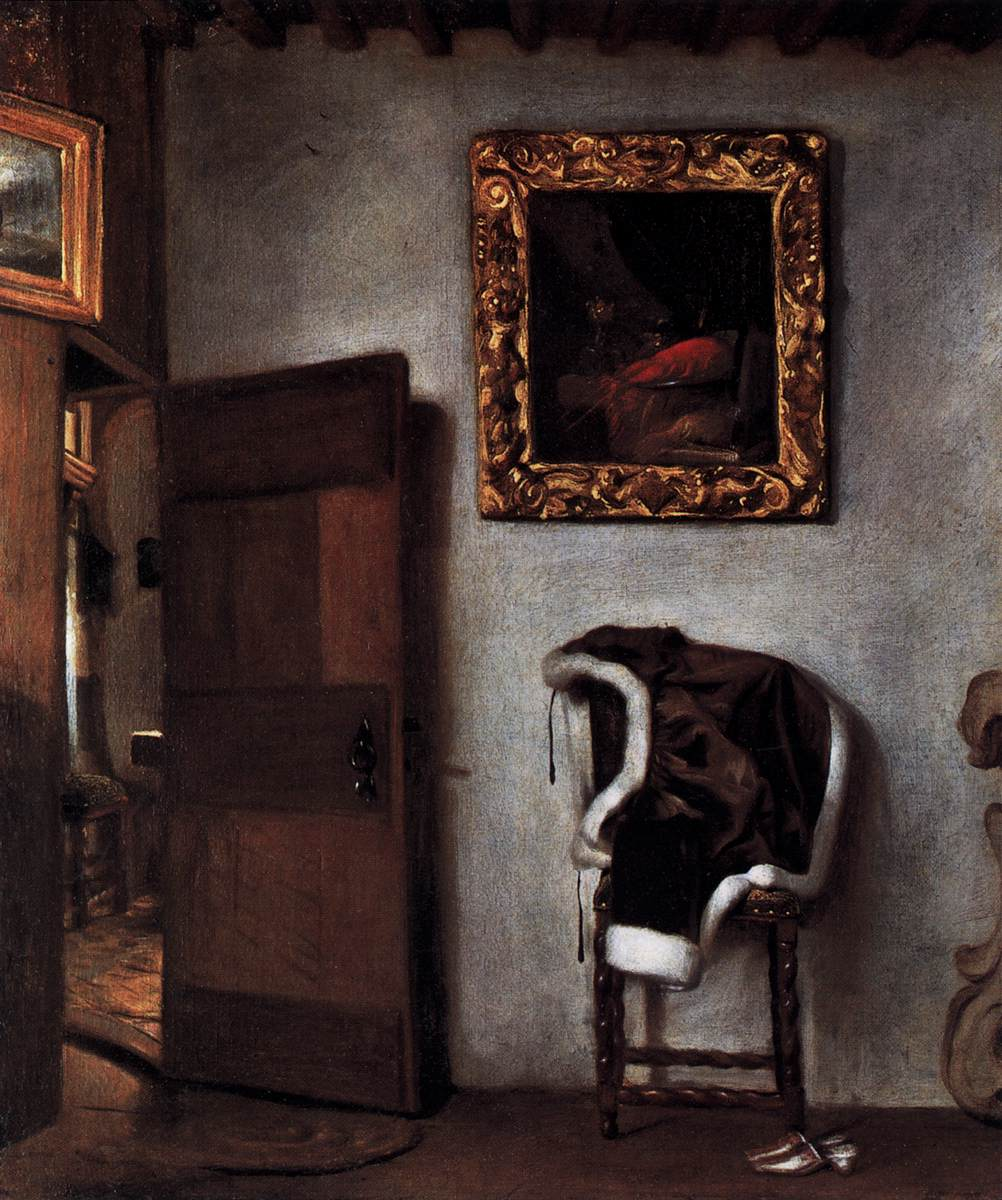
Dutch Interior

Hendrick van der Burgh (also spelled "van der Burch"; baptised 27 June 1627 – after 1665), was a Dutch Golden Age painter known for his genre scenes. He was related to contemporary Pieter de Hooch, as step brother following the marriage of his sister, Jannetge, to de Hooch. He is considered part of the Delft School, although his artistic output was relatively small, he is known for prints and portraits, with the monogram "HVB".

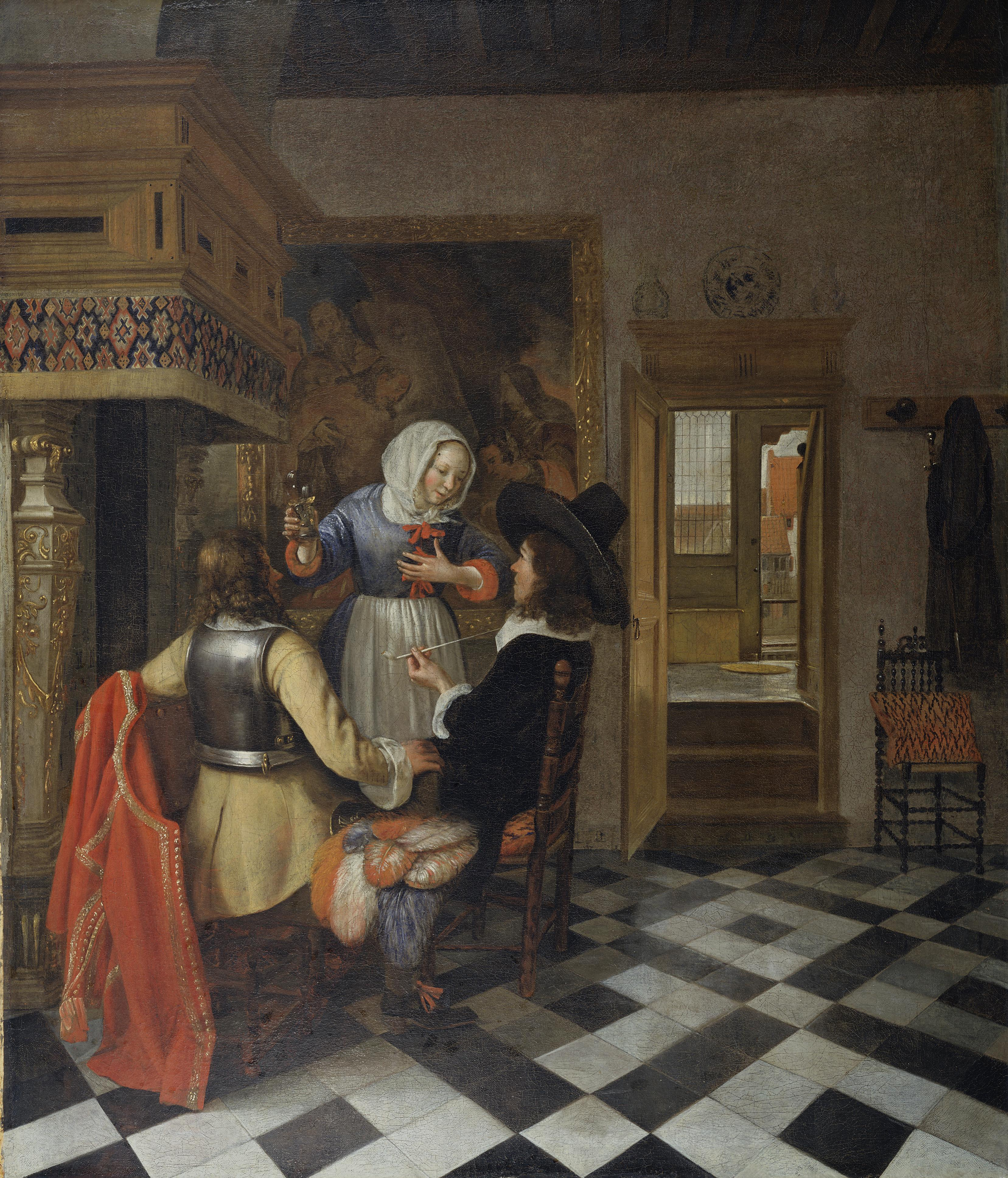
Drinkers before the Fireplace, 1660, Frick Collection

== Biography ==
=== Early life and training ===
Hendrick van der Burgh was baptised in Naaldwijk, a village near Delft, on 27 June 1627. Hendrick had at least four sisters: Annetje, Jacomina, Maria, and Trijntge. His father, Rochus Hendricksz van der Burgh, was a candlemaker. Jannetje de Hooch, the wife of the painter Pieter de Hooch, has been identified as either a sister of Van der Burgh. The Van der Burgh family lived in Honselaarsdijk at the time of Hendrick's birth and moved to Voorburg in 1633. They later moved to Delft, where they lived on the Binnenwatersloot. Van der Burgh may have received his training as a painter in Delft, although sources do not name his teacher.

=== Artistic career ===
Van der Burgh joined the Guild of Saint Luke in Delft on 25 January 1649. He paid a six guilder registration fee, rather than the 12 guilder fee usually charged to people born outside of Delft. Van der Burgh signed a notarial document with Pieter de Hooch on 5 August 1652. This is the earliest evidence of De Hooch's residence in Delft.

By 4 September 1655, Van der Burgh had moved to Leiden. He married Cornelia Cornelisdr van Rossum in November 1655. The couple had five children, including a son named Rochus, who also became a painter. In January 1656, the couple rented a house on the Rapenburg canal in Leiden. Although the date he joined is unknown, Van der Burgh was a member of the Leiden painters' guild. He and his family had moved to Amsterdam by May 1659. By 1661, Van der Burgh had moved back to Leiden. A 1664 record of Van der Burgh paying dues to the Delft painters' guild is the last surviving record that mentions him. The date of his death is unknown. His last child was baptised in Leiden in 1666, which suggests that he died no earlier than 1665.

=== Artistic influences and style ===
Van der Burgh's early work consisted of guardroom scenes, which were influenced by the work of Jacob Duck, Cornelis Duyster, and Anthonie Palamedesz. His later work included outdoor scenes. Sources describe Van der Burgh's painting as being heavily dependent on the work of other Dutch artists, particularly Pieter de Hooch. One source notes that Van der Burgh's outdoor scenes are "unthinkable without the inspiration of De Hooch's . . . courtyards". De Hooch's influence can be found in Van der Burgh's A Woman and Child at a Window, noting similarities in the "careful perspectival construction and contre-jour lighting". However, this source also notes that the niche motif and still life details in this piece may have been inspired by paintings that Van der Burgh saw after he moved to Leiden. One source describes Van der Burgh's style as "eclectic", "derivative rather than original", and "charming".
