= Interior with a Woman Weighing Gold Coin =

Painting by Pieter de Hooch

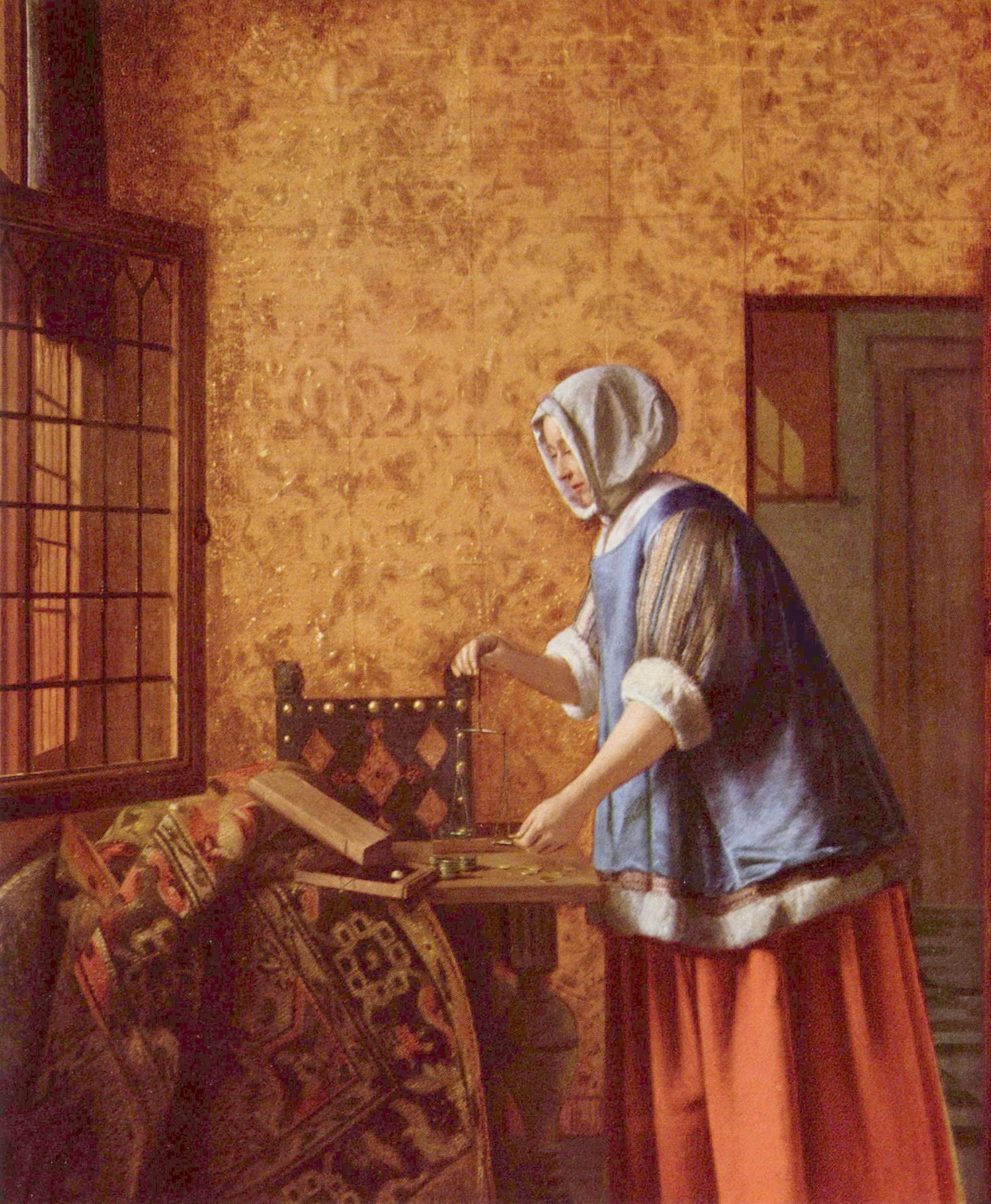
- Artist: Pieter de Hooch
- Year: 1659–1662
- Medium: oil on canvas
- Dimensions: 61 cm × 53 cm (24 in × 21 in)
- Location: Gemäldegalerie; Berlin

Interior with a Woman Weighing Gold Coin (1659–1662) is an oil-on-canvas painting by the Dutch Golden Age painter Pieter de Hooch. It is part of the collection of the Gemäldegalerie, Berlin.

The painting was documented by Hofstede de Groot in 1910, who wrote:

96. Interior with a Woman weighing Gold Coin. A woman stands in profile in a room, weighing gold coin. Her rich dress, trimmed with fur, suggests that she is the wife of a wealthy money-lender. It is a picture of rare beauty. Canvas, 24 inches by 21 1/2 inches. Sales, (Probably) Beckford, London, 1823 (£30:9s., Evans). Brun of Geneva, Paris, November 30, 1841, No. 20 (865 francs).

The composition is strongly related to Vermeer's Woman Holding a Balance.

== See also ==
- List of paintings by Pieter de Hooch
