= The Empty Glass =

Painting by Pieter de Hooch

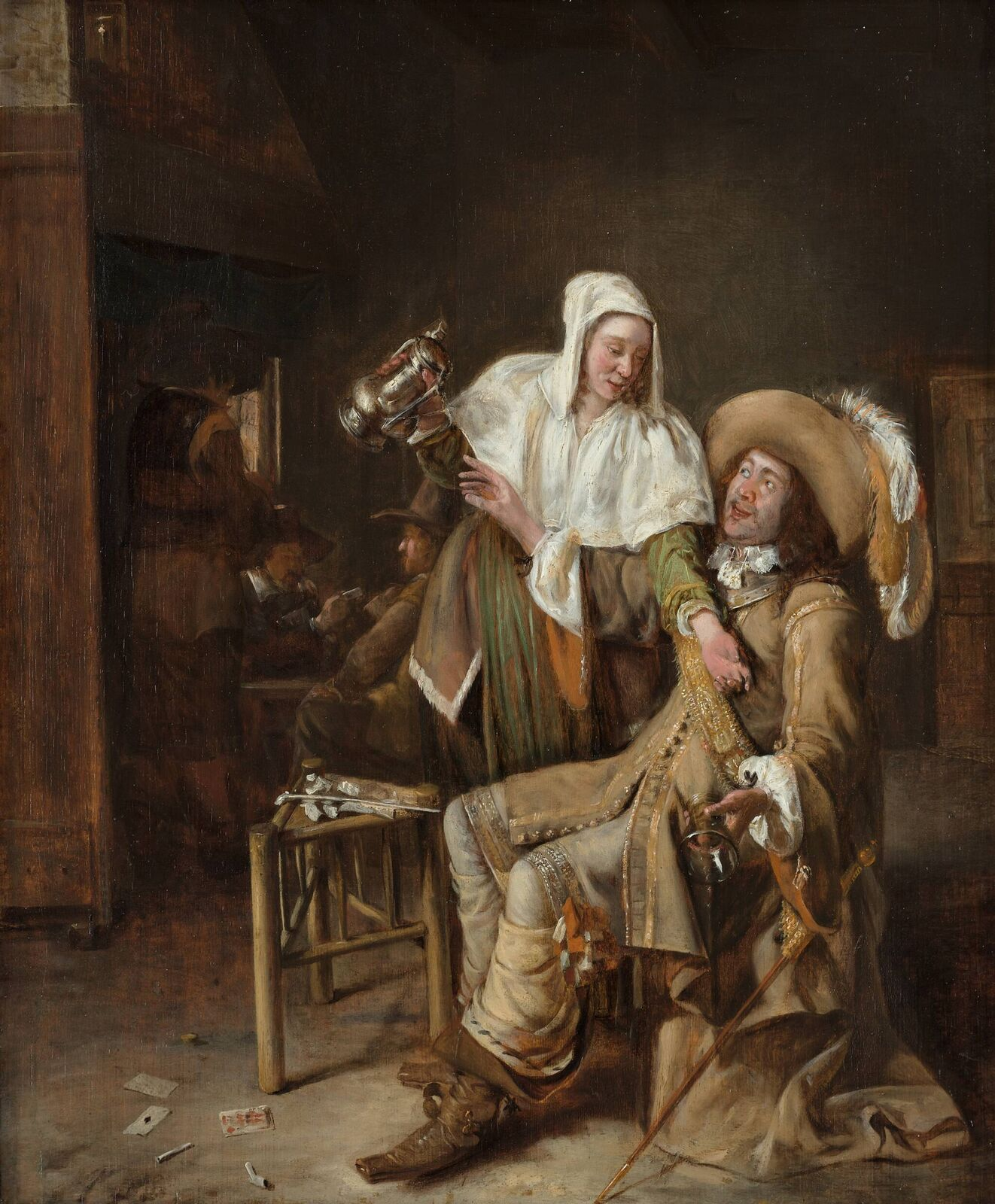
- Artist: Pieter de Hooch
- Year: c. 1652
- Medium: Oil on panel
- Dimensions: 44 cm × 35 cm (17 in × 14 in)
- Location: Museum Boijmans Van Beuningen, Rotterdam

The Empty Glass (c. 1652) is an oil-on-panel painting by the Dutch painter Pieter de Hooch. It is an example of Dutch Golden Age painting and is now in the collection of the Museum Boijmans Van Beuningen, in Rotterdam in the Netherlands.

This painting was documented as a work by Gabriel Metsu by Hofstede de Groot in 1908, who wrote:

204b. A Woman handing a Glass of Wine to an Officer. Sm. 85. A woman hands a glass of wine to an officer. Two persons are playing cards, while a third looks on. Panel, 17 1/2 inches by 14 inches. Described by Descamps (vol. ii.).

Sales. Hendrik Verschuuring, The Hague, September 17, 1770, No. 106.

- C. van Heemskerck, The Hague, November 18, 1783, No. 5 (82 florins) – said to be by Metsu or in his manner.

This scene is very similar to other paintings de Hooch made in this period:

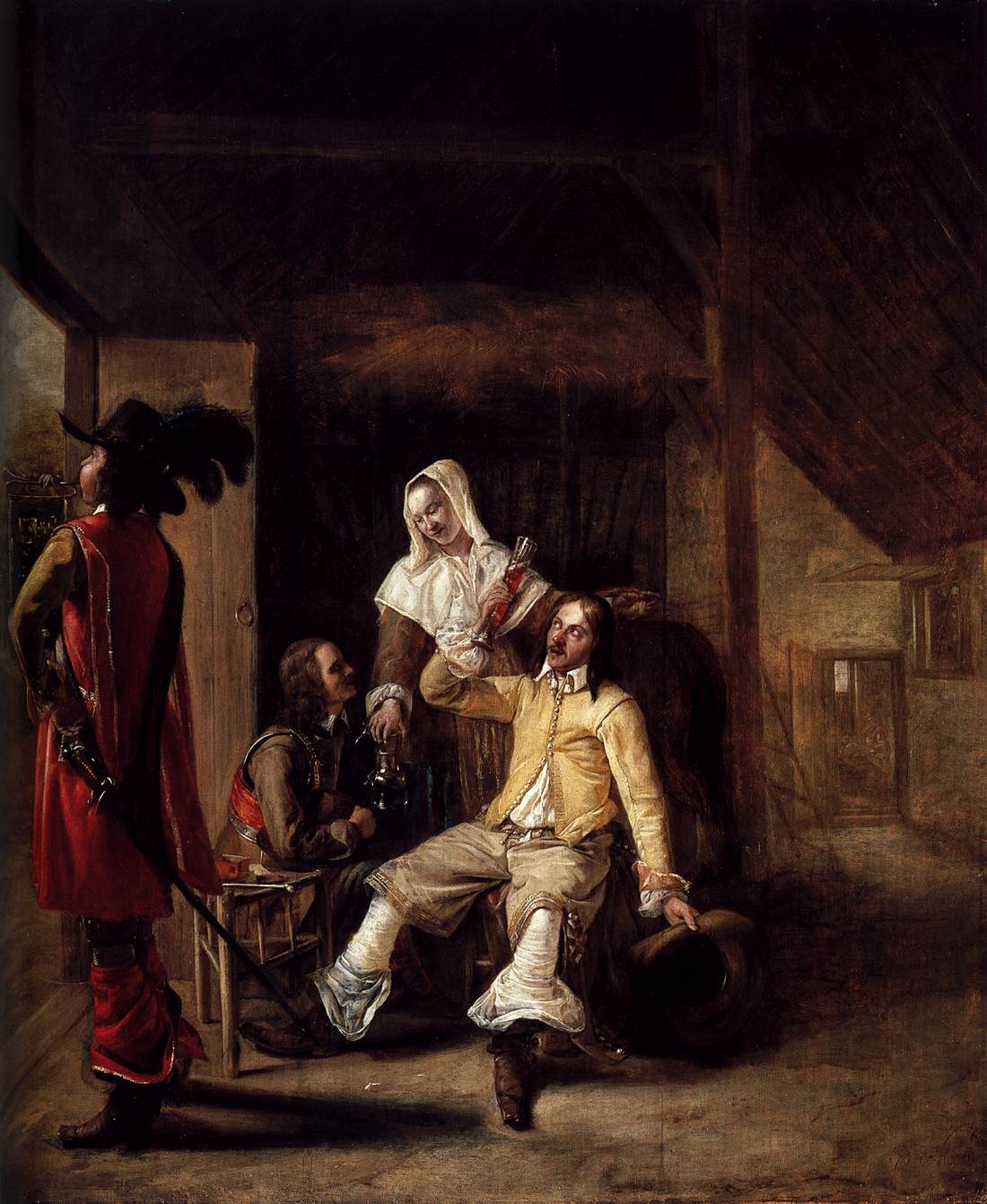
Two Soldiers and a Serving Woman with a Trumpeter

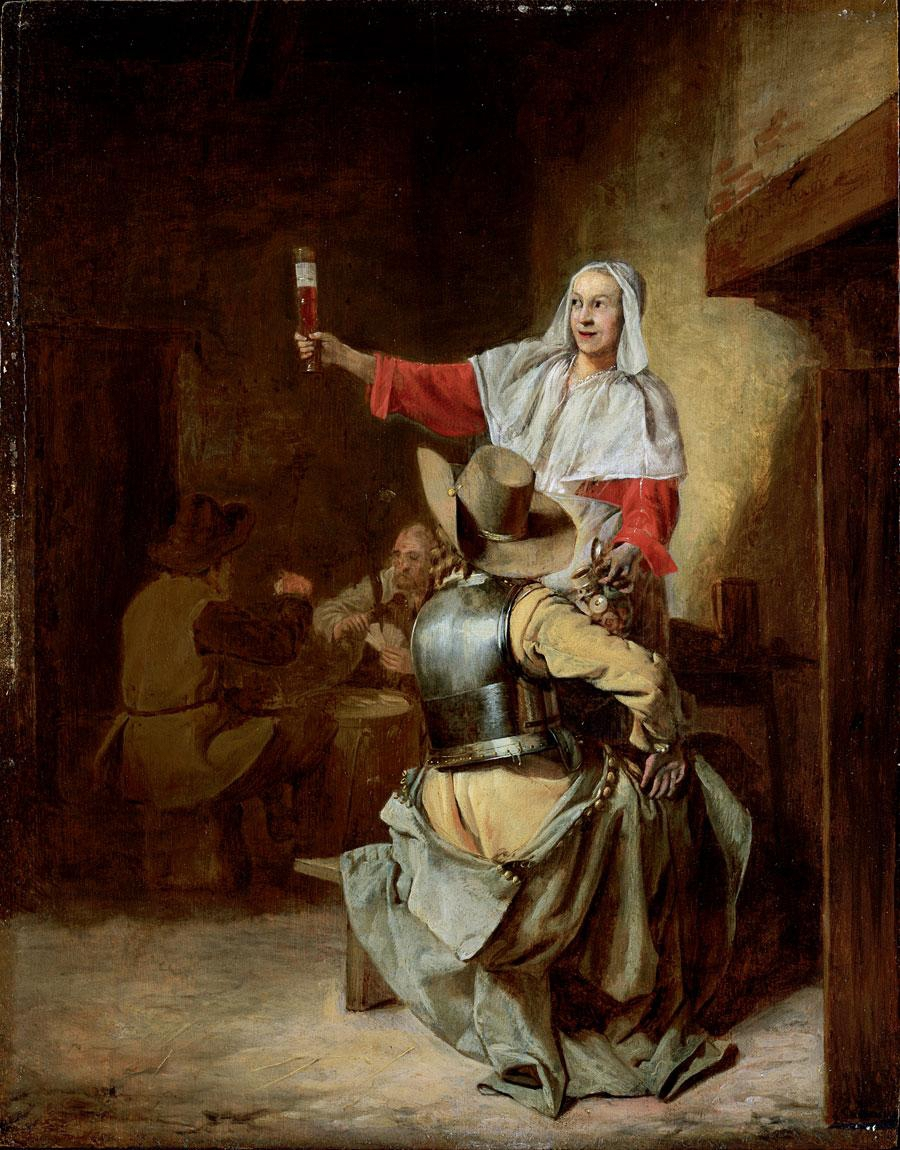
Tavern interior with soldiers and a serving woman

== See also ==
- List of paintings by Pieter de Hooch
