= Pieter de Hooch =

Dutch Golden Age painter (born 1629)

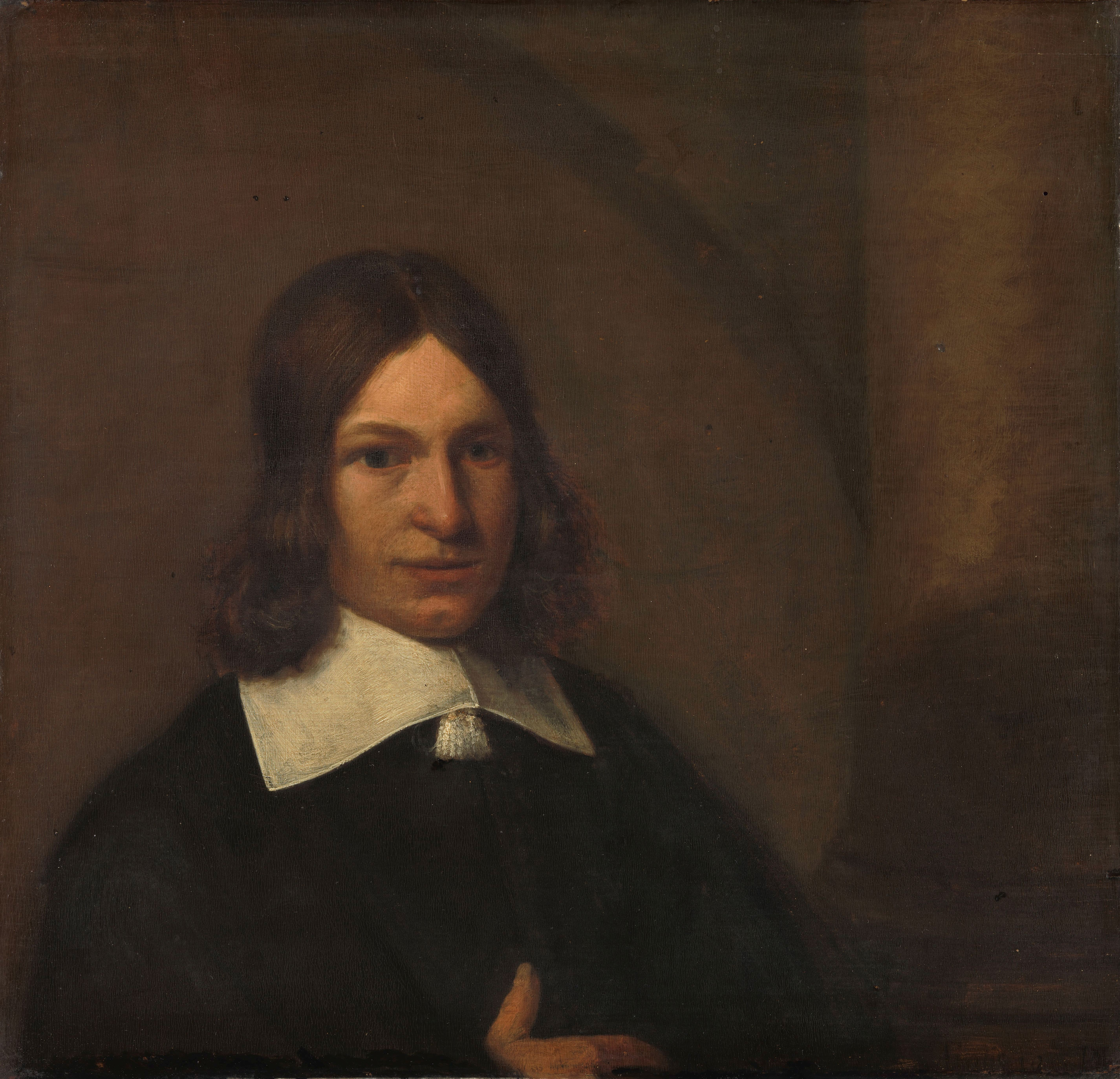
- Possible self-portrait (1648–1649?)
- Born: Pieter Hendricksz. de Hooch; Rotterdam, Dutch Republic
- Baptised: 20 December 1629
- Died: In or after 1679 (aged at least 49)
- Education: Nicolaes Berchem
- Known for: Painting
- Movement: Dutch Golden Age; Baroque; Delft School
- Spouse: Jannetje van der Burch (m. 1654)
- Children: 7

Pieter Hendricksz. de Hooch (Dutch: [ˈpitər ˈɦɛndrɪksoːn də ˈɦoːx]; also spelled Hoogh or Hooghe; bapt. 20 December 1629 – in or after 1679), was a Dutch Golden Age painter famous for his genre works of quiet domestic scenes with an open doorway. He was a contemporary, in the Delft Guild of St. Luke, of Jan Vermeer with whom his work shares themes and style. De Hooch was first recorded in Delft on 5 August 1652, when he and another painter, Hendrick van der Burgh witnessed the signing of a will. He was last documented in 1679, but his date of death is unknown (Note: A painting dated 1684 has been attributed to him (no. 161 in Sutton’s catalogue). If the date is accurate, it would indicate that he was still alive at that time. However, neither the attribution nor the dating of this work has gained broad acceptance. Consequently, 1679 is generally regarded as the last securely documented date of his life, although it remains possible that he survived beyond that year.) (his son Pieter died in 1684, a date often wrongly given for the father).

== Biography ==
De Hooch was born in Rotterdam to Hendrick Hendricksz de Hooch, a bricklayer, and Annetge Pieters, a midwife. He was baptised at the Reformed Church in Rotterdam in 1629. He was the eldest of five children and outlived all of his siblings, evidently raised in a working class home. Though, his father was described as a "master bricklayer", hence a skilled artisan required to be a member of the guild. Little is known of his early life, and most archival evidence suggests he worked in Rotterdam, Delft, and Amsterdam. According to his first biographer Arnold Houbraken, he studied art in Haarlem under the landscape painter Nicolaes Berchem at the same time as Jacob Ochtervelt and was known for his "kamergezichten" or "room-views" with ladies and gentlemen in conversation. But De Hooch's work seems to continue in the spirit of Hendrik Sorgh, an older Rotterdam painter who had a special affinity for organising figures in interiors.

Beginning in 1650 in Rotterdam, he worked as a painter and servant for Justus de la Grange, a linen merchant and art collector who was his first cousin once removed by marriage through his maternal aunt. His service for the merchant required him to accompany him on his travels to The Hague, Leiden, and Delft, to which he moved in 1652, settling on Oude Delft 161 with de la Grange. Later, he lived next to the former Saint Hieronymus convent, once situated between Oude Delft and Westvest. It is likely that De Hooch handed over most of his works to la Grange during this period in exchange for board and other benefits, as this was a common commercial arrangement for painters at the time, and a later inventory recorded that la Grange possessed eleven of his paintings.

De Hooch was married in Delft in 1654 to Jannetje van der Burch, sister of Hendrick van der Burgh, by whom he fathered seven children. Their eldest son, Pieter, was baptised in Delft in 1655, followed by a daughter, Anna, on 14 November 1656. While in Delft, De Hooch is believed to have been influenced by Carel Fabritius, a fellow painter of the Delft School known for his experiments with perspective, and by the domestic genre scenes of Nicolaes Maes, who was working in Dordrecht at the time. He became a member of the painters' guild of Saint Luke in 1655 (two years after Vermeer). Though, he must have faced financial difficulties, as he was unable to pay the admission fee of 12 guilders.

Based on the fact that his wife attended a baptism in Amsterdam in 1660, it has been determined that he moved to Amsterdam by then, though the success of the trekschuit meant that a trip to Amsterdam could be made easily in a day. After the family's move to Amsterdam, five more children were born: Dieuwertje (baptised on 15 April 1661), François (1662/1663), Dieuwertje (1664), Anna (1666), and Fransoijs (baptised in 1672). The reuse of the names Dieuwertje, Anna, and François suggests that their older namesakes had died in childhood. Some of his children were likely named after Frans Boogert, who acted as a godfather to some of De Hooch's children.

Little is known of De Hooch's living arrangements in Amsterdam, though it has been established that he had contact with Emanuel de Witte through a lawsuit brought against de Witte. The burial records in Amsterdam for two of De Hooch's children, dated June 1663 and March 1665, indicate that he resided on Regulierspad and Engelspad, respectively. These "paths" lay outside the old city walls and were known for housing some of the city's poorest inhabitants. This sharply contrasted De Hooch's own living situation with that of his affluent clients in Amsterdam. In 1668, he was living in the Konijnenstraat near the Lauriergracht, where he stayed for the next two years at least. In 1674, De Hooch's financial situation was meagre enough to escape the tax registers entirely, likely a result of the declining art market in the Dutch Republic, following the onerous Rampjaar, which severely strained the economy and all facets of Dutch cultural activity. In his later years, De Hooch painted more and often larger paintings, measuring over 100 centimetres.

The date of De Hooch's death is unknown. For many years, he was believed to have died in 1684 while confined to the Amsterdam Dolhuis, a psychiatric institution. However, archival research established that the patient who died there was his eldest son, Pieter Pietersz. de Hooch. The younger Pieter's admission to the Dolhuis in 1679 constitutes the last known documentary reference to the artist in Amsterdam.

When his son died in 1684, the Dolhuis paid for his burial, suggesting that his parents may have been unable to afford the expense, had left the city, or had died in the meantime. No subsequent records of De Hooch, his wife, or their children have been identified. It has been suggested that the family may have relocated to another city, possibly Middelburg, where De Hooch's father spent his later years, although no evidence confirming such a move has been found. A death date of 1684 or later has also been proposed on the basis of a painting bearing that date. (Note: The painting is catalogued in Sutton 1980, p. 119, catalogue no. 161. Its attribution and dating remain disputed.) In the absence of further documentary evidence, a death in or after 1679 remains preferable.

In 2017 the Turing Foundation sponsored a new research project for the Delft Museum Het Prinsenhof and the Rijksmuseum to work on a new overview exhibition focussing on the works in their collection, presented in a combined exhibition 2019–2020.

== Works ==
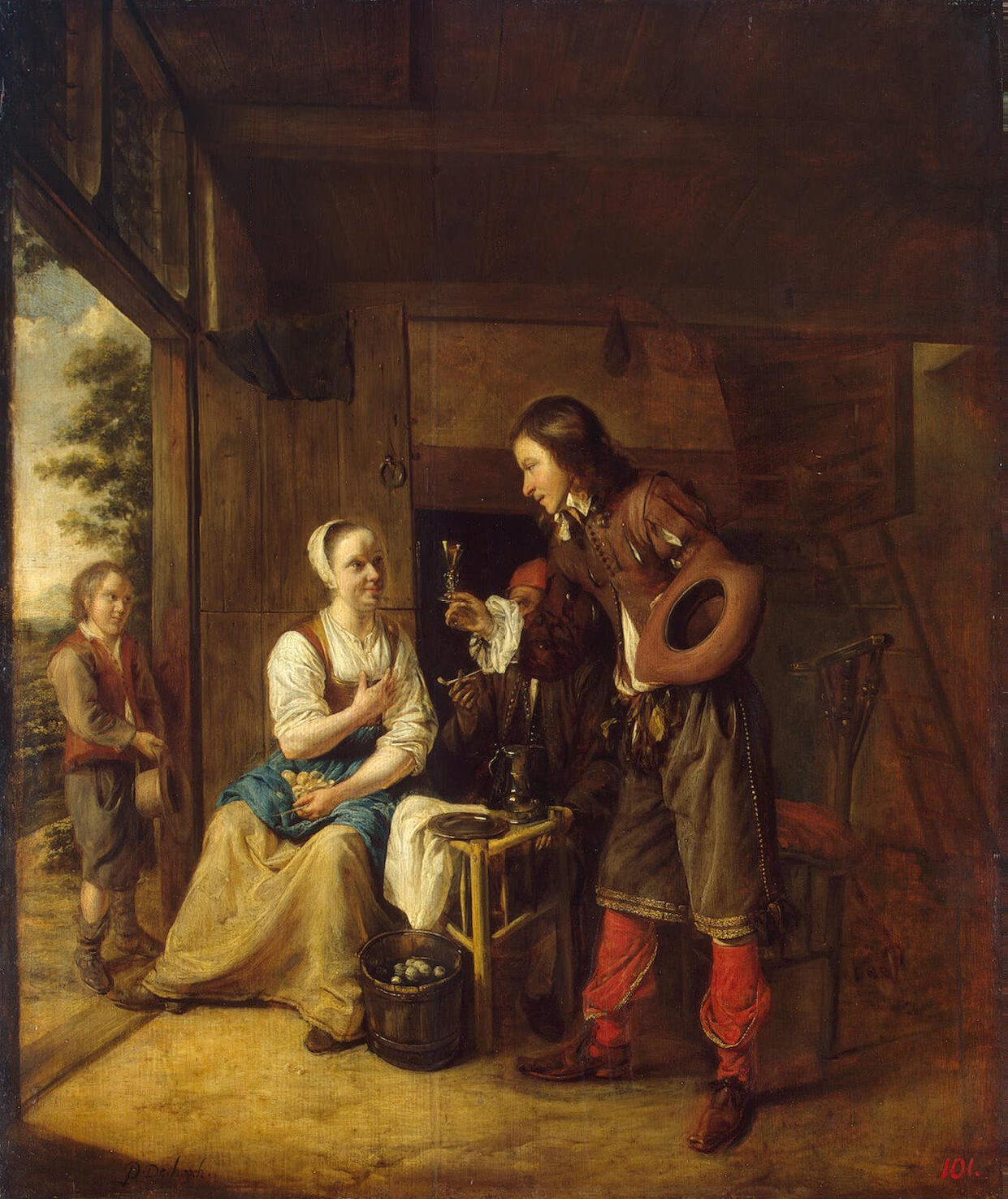
Man Offering a Glass of Wine to a Woman c. 1653, a display in chiaroscuro and use of a doorsien.

Pieter de Hooch's early artistic endeavours were largely centered on depicting soldiers and peasants in settings like stables and taverns. This subject matter was common among his contemporaries, including Adriaen van Ostade, Gerard ter Borch, and Ludolf de Jongh. However, De Hooch's primary interest was not the subject itself, but rather using these scenes to refine his mastery of light, colour, and perspective. In these merry company (Note: "Merry company" is the accepted English translation for the Dutch gezelschappen (meaning "companies" or social groups). In the 17th century, this term was used for a wide variety of scenes depicting social life. The koortegardje (corps de garde) is a specific type of gezelschap that is defined by its military subject matter, exclusively showing soldiers in guardrooms.) compositions, the focal point is not dispersed among numerous figure groups, in contrast to the soldier paintings of other artists. Instead, emphasis is concentrated on a principal group illuminated directly by the sun, which prominently stands out against a dark background, in the style of chiaroscuro. These works frequently showcase colour combinations typical of the artist's later period, such as a vivid vermilion and lemon yellow, often complemented by a warm dark green or blue in the shadows. Occasionally, backgrounds open into brightly lit adjoining rooms, and lighted figures may be framed in such doorways, known as a doorsien or doorkijkje, literally a 'see through' or 'peek through'. (Note: While both terms refer to techniques creating depth, doorsien ("see-through") emphasises the technical skill of rendering a deep, continuous space through multiple openings. In contrast, doorkijkje ("peek-through") focuses on the narrative charm of revealing a smaller, secondary scene through a single opening like a doorway.) These serve as reasonably reliable 'tells' of De Hooch's style. The contrast between light and shadow tends to be accentuated, with sunlit portions of the canvas appearing cooler and paler compared to his later works.

=== Delft Period: 1652–1660 ===
De Hooch's early artistic development is evidenced by the maturity exhibited in his paintings executed around 1655. By 1654, he had attained a zenith in depicting soldier scenes, a focus that persisted into the initial years of his marriage. After the birth of his first children in the mid-1650s, he switched his focus to domestic scenes. These were possibly of his own family, though his works of well-to-do women breastfeeding and caring for children could also indicate that he had attended his mother on her rounds as a midwife. De Hooch's experience as a servant under Justus de la Grange likely influenced his empathetic and nuanced portrayal of servants and domestic workers in his paintings. His work showed astute observation of the mundane details of everyday life while also functioning as well-ordered morality tales. From the fact he dated a whole series in 1658, whilst he dated very few others, suggests he himself recognised the importance of these paintings.

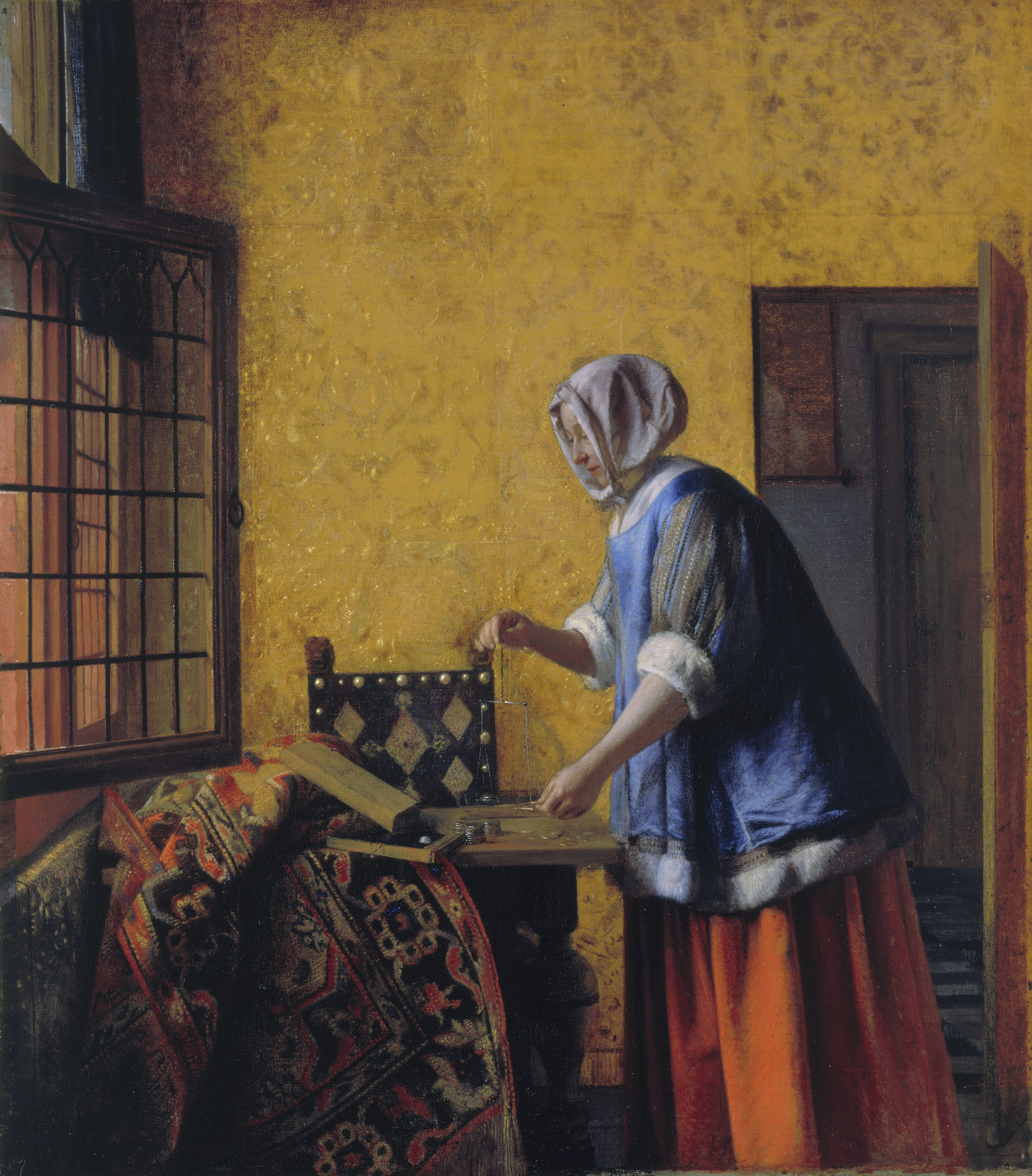
Woman Weighing Gold and Silver Coins c. 1659 – c. 1662, similar to Vermeer's Woman Holding a Balance.

These paintings often exhibited a sophisticated and delicate treatment of light similar to those of Vermeer, who lived in Delft at the same time as De Hooch. The themes and compositions are also comparable between De Hooch and Vermeer. 19th-century art historians had assumed that Vermeer had been influenced by De Hooch's work, and indeed De Hooch first demonstrated a special interest in combining the figure with interior geometry. He succeeded in blending the South Holland techniques of perspective and interior space construction with powerful naturalism and focus on figures, a style undoubtedly influenced by the prominent genre painters of his time. An x-ray of Woman Weighing Gold and Silver Coins showed that De Hooch originally depicted a seated man at the table, which was later overpainted. This detail points to his canvas possibly being the more original model that Vermeer quoted. It is also possible both works were painted simultaneously, during which De Hooch could have been inspired to remove the figure. Another signature work of Vermeer, The Love Letter, is also said to have been inspired by De Hooch. Some paintings by Vermeer have been found to carry spurious signatures of Pieter de Hooch, possibly added posthumously to increase their market value while Vermeer was still little known.

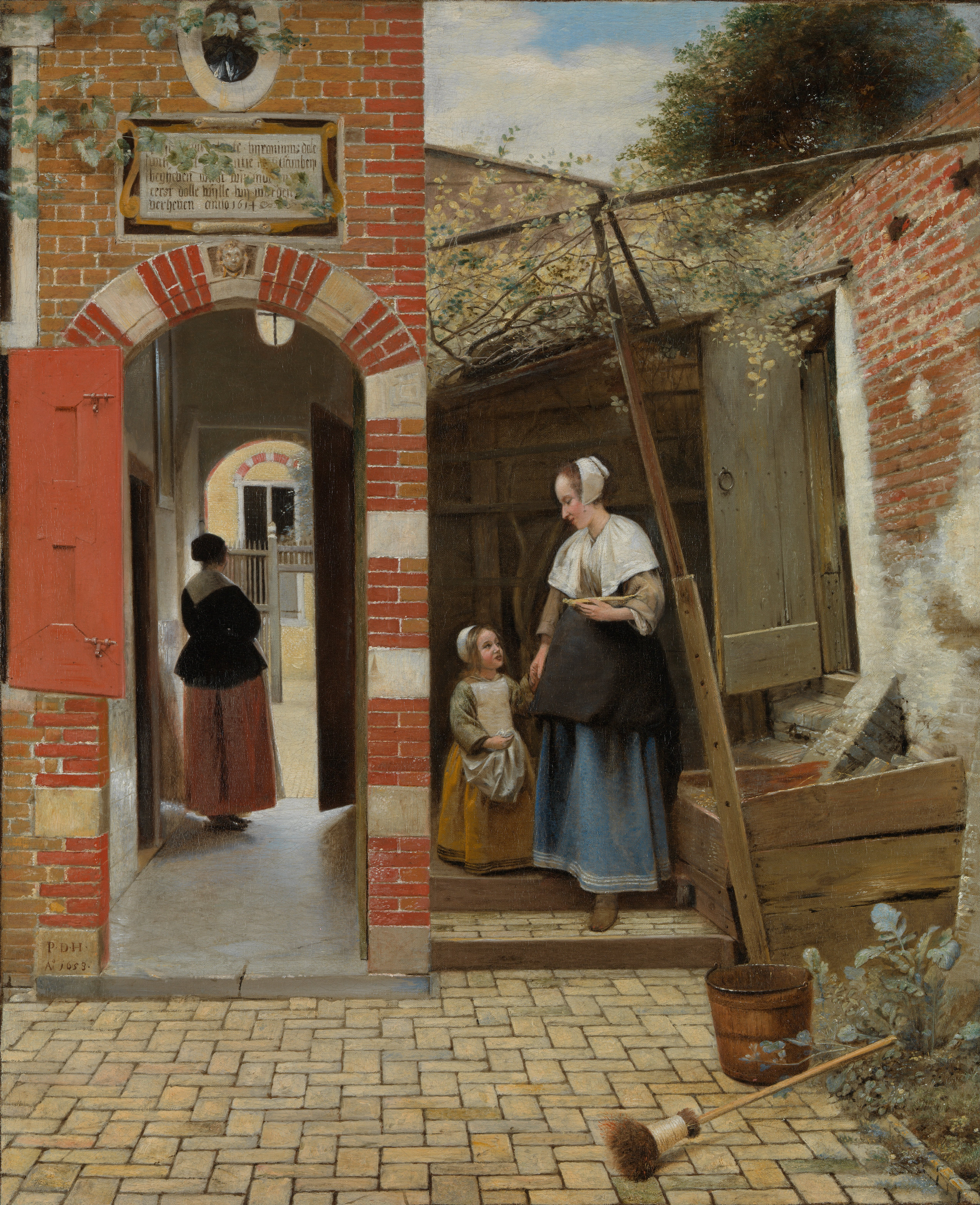
The Courtyard of a House in Delft c. 1658

In the late 1650s, De Hooch developed a distinctive style of genre painting, characterised by carefully ordered architectural spaces, naturalistic lighting, and tranquil depictions of domestic life. His paintings of middle-class homes and courtyards, though seemingly informal, were composed with a sophisticated understanding of linear perspective and close observation of light and atmosphere. Many of these paintings revisit themes from his early works, such as merry companies with drinking soldiers, accompanied by their hostesses. However, the dimly lit stables and taverns of his earlier period are replaced by sunlit interiors, gardens, and courtyards of the middle class. His compositions increasingly featured women and children engaged in everyday activities, frequently situated within orderly, well-appointed domestic surroundings, frequently incorporating views through doorways and passageways into adjoining spaces. Technical examinations have identified pinholes at the vanishing points of his canvases, and numerous pentimenti show extensive compositional revisions during the painting process. Around 1658, De Hooch also occasionally employed a second horizon line and an additional set of converging orthogonals to construct more complex architectural spaces.

De Hooch's courtyard paintings and urban scenes developed alongside the emergence of the cityscape as a distinct speciality of seventeenth-century Dutch painting. His depictions of courtyards, bleaching grounds, and streets frequently feature prominent genre figures within carefully constructed urban settings. During his Delft period, these incorporated recognisable landmarks such as the Oude Kerk and Nieuwe Kerk, while his later Amsterdam paintings occasionally featured the roofline of the newly built Amsterdam Town Hall. De Hooch also drew upon the architecture of his immediate surroundings, including courtyards near the Binnenwatersloot in Delft, where his wife's family owned property. Nevertheless, these settings were often imaginary, with recognisable buildings and architectural features rearranged to suit the composition rather than reproduce actual locations.

De Hooch shared certain themes and compositional techniques with Emanuel de Witte, particularly an interest in architectural perspective and the relationship between interior and exterior spaces. After moving to Amsterdam in 1651, De Witte increasingly specialised in church interiors, often emphasising the architectural spaces themselves. De Hooch, by contrast, generally placed greater emphasis on domestic activities and interactions between figures, while maintaining a detailed treatment of their architectural surroundings. Art historian Martha Hollander has interpreted his recurring use of doorways, courtyards, and adjoining rooms as an exploration of the relationship between public and private life in seventeenth-century Dutch society. The architectural openness of these compositions connects the domestic interior with the wider urban environment, while their frequent depictions of women, children, and household activities reflect contemporary conceptions of domesticity and social order.

=== Amsterdam Period: 1660–1670 ===
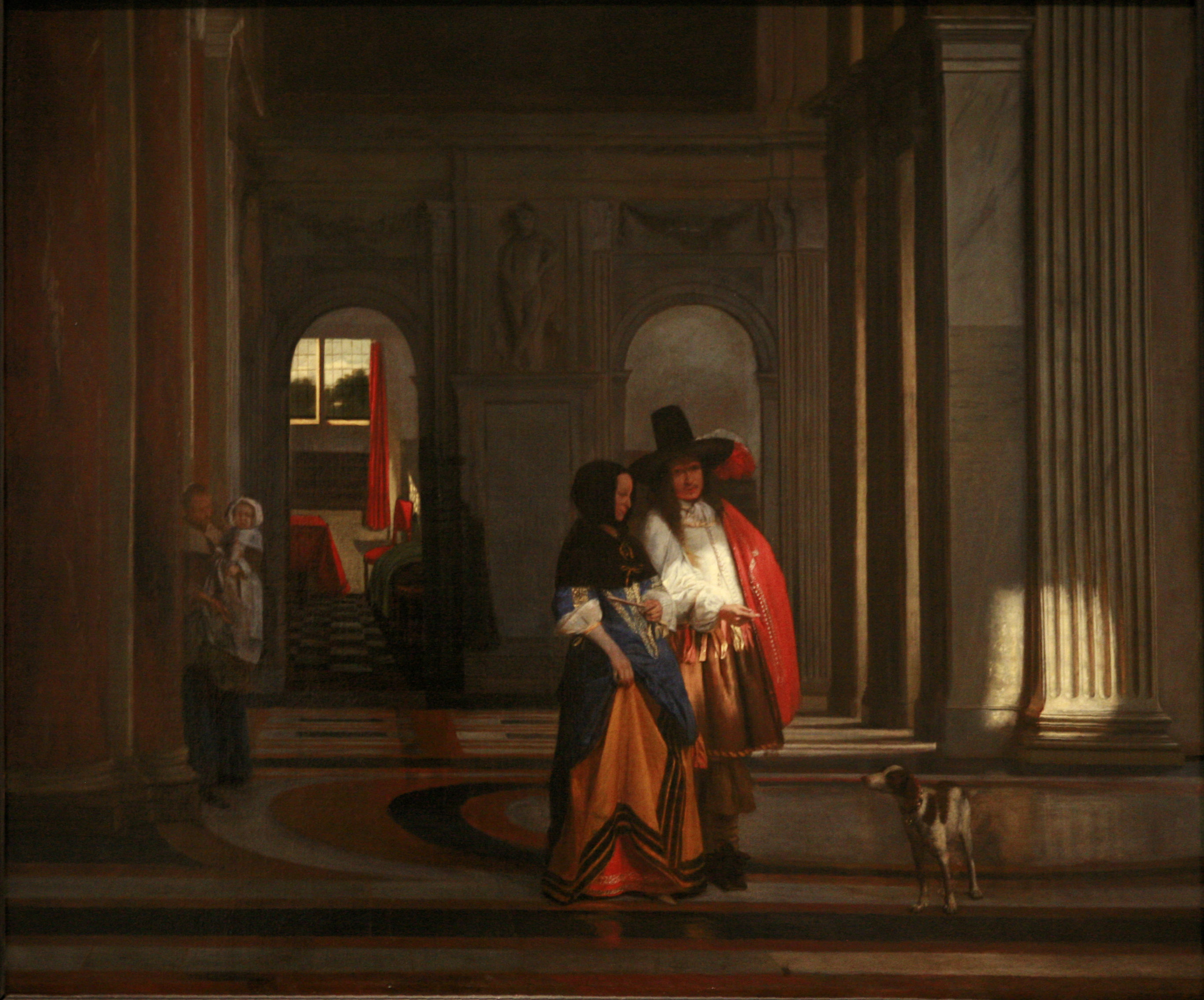
Going for a Walk in the Amsterdam Town Hall c. 1663–1665

In the 1660s, he began to paint for wealthier patrons in Amsterdam who gained their wealth through increased trade and stock exchanges in a time of unrivalled prosperity, coinciding with De Hooch's premier works, during his Delft-Amsterdam transition. During this period, he was known for upscale merry company scenes and family portraits in opulent interiors with marble floors and high ceilings. During his time in Amsterdam, he continued to make his domestic scenes, but both the interiors and their occupants appear more opulent. With the change in setting, his art evolved to feature cooler colours, more substantial figures, and a technique marked by greater precision. Lacking entrée to the homes of the aristocracy, De Hooch conceived the idea of utilising the newly built City Hall as a background for his social scenes, a marble-covered setting once considered the eighth wonder of the world. He was thus enabled to paint accurate architectural settings, and the interiors, and to some extent, the light and colour schemes in these paintings are extremely successful. The reference of these public buildings is likely accountable for the overrepresentation of wealth in Dutch households. These works are often associated with the Leidse Fijnschilders, notable for their meticulously detailed paintings, which commanded very high prices. Though, the price of De Hooch's works did not garner the same prices as the Fijnschilders' until the early nineteenth century, when interest in his works increased, as English collectors, including George IV, Sir Robert Peel, and the Duke of Wellington acquired works by De Hooch. Before this period, his paintings commanded a smaller price than that of Vermeer's, and only a fraction of that of Dou's or van Mieris'.

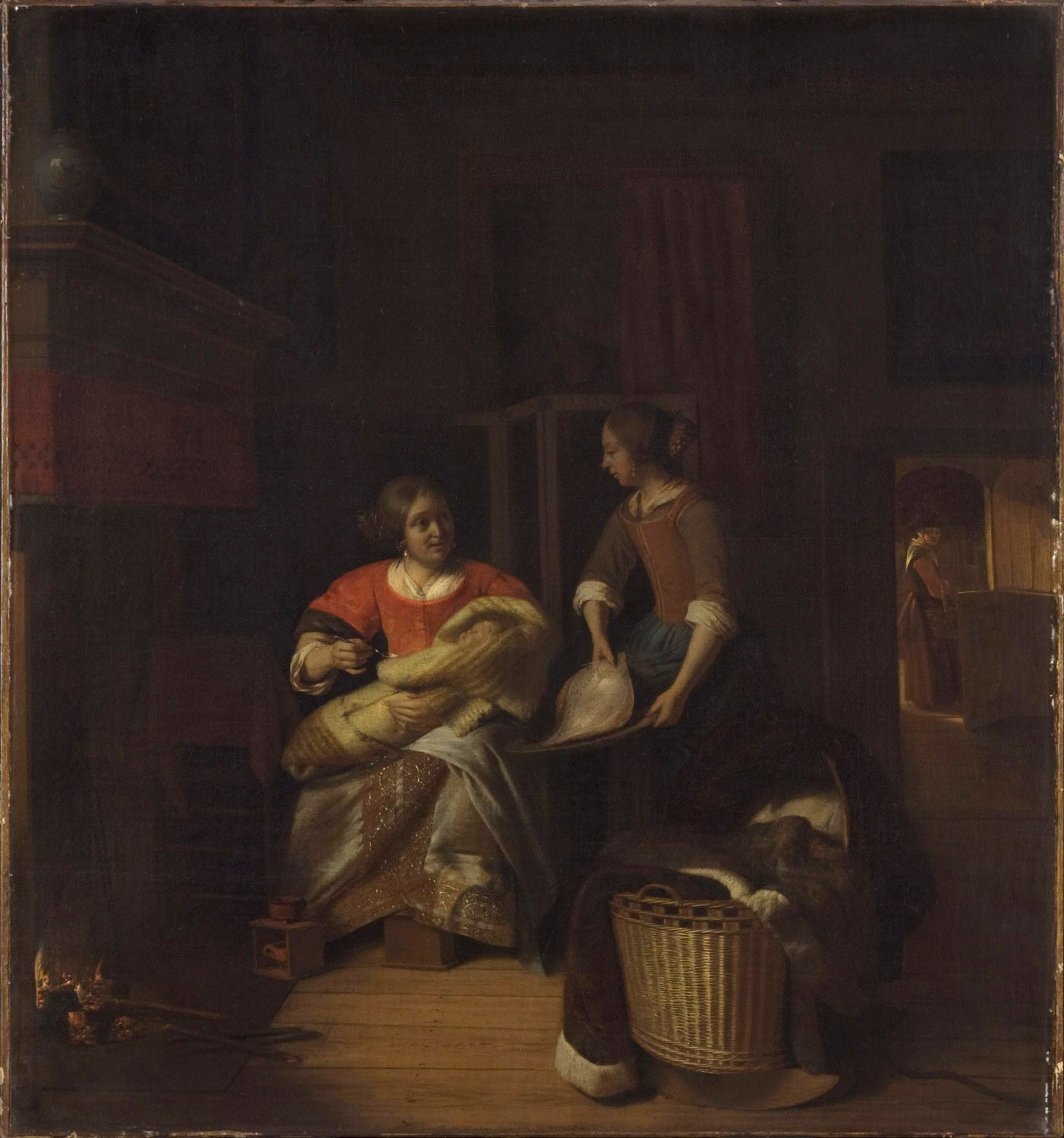
A Lady and a Child with a Serving Maid c. 1674 – c. 1676

=== Late Period in Amsterdam: 1670–1679 ===
Many scholars assert that Pieter de Hooch's work from around 1670 onwards became more stylised and diminished in quality, with some describing him as having "quickly lost his inspiration and charm." However, these assessments are frequently critiqued for applying the aesthetic standards of his earlier Delft paintings rather than considering the evolving artistic norms of post-1670 Dutch art, and the disastrous Rampjaar of 1672 which similarly claimed other contemporary careers. This included renowned masters of the period, such as Jan Steen, who applied for a licence to run a tavern in the wake of economic downturn.

During his Amsterdam period, De Hooch encountered less success when revisiting motifs from his Delft era, such as depictions involving a young mother with her child and a serving maid, or when he revisited the scenes featuring soldiers. Though facing minor success with reinterpretations of his Delft period, these instances of self-repetition are devoid of fresh impressions. The paintings are perceived as having an exaggeratedly dark overall tone, and certain prominent colours, notably a sullen vermillion and a cold blue prevalent in the shadows, characterised as harsh. Nearly 50% of De Hooch's works date to the last 15 years of his activity, likely to compensate for lower compensation in the wake of the Rampjaar.

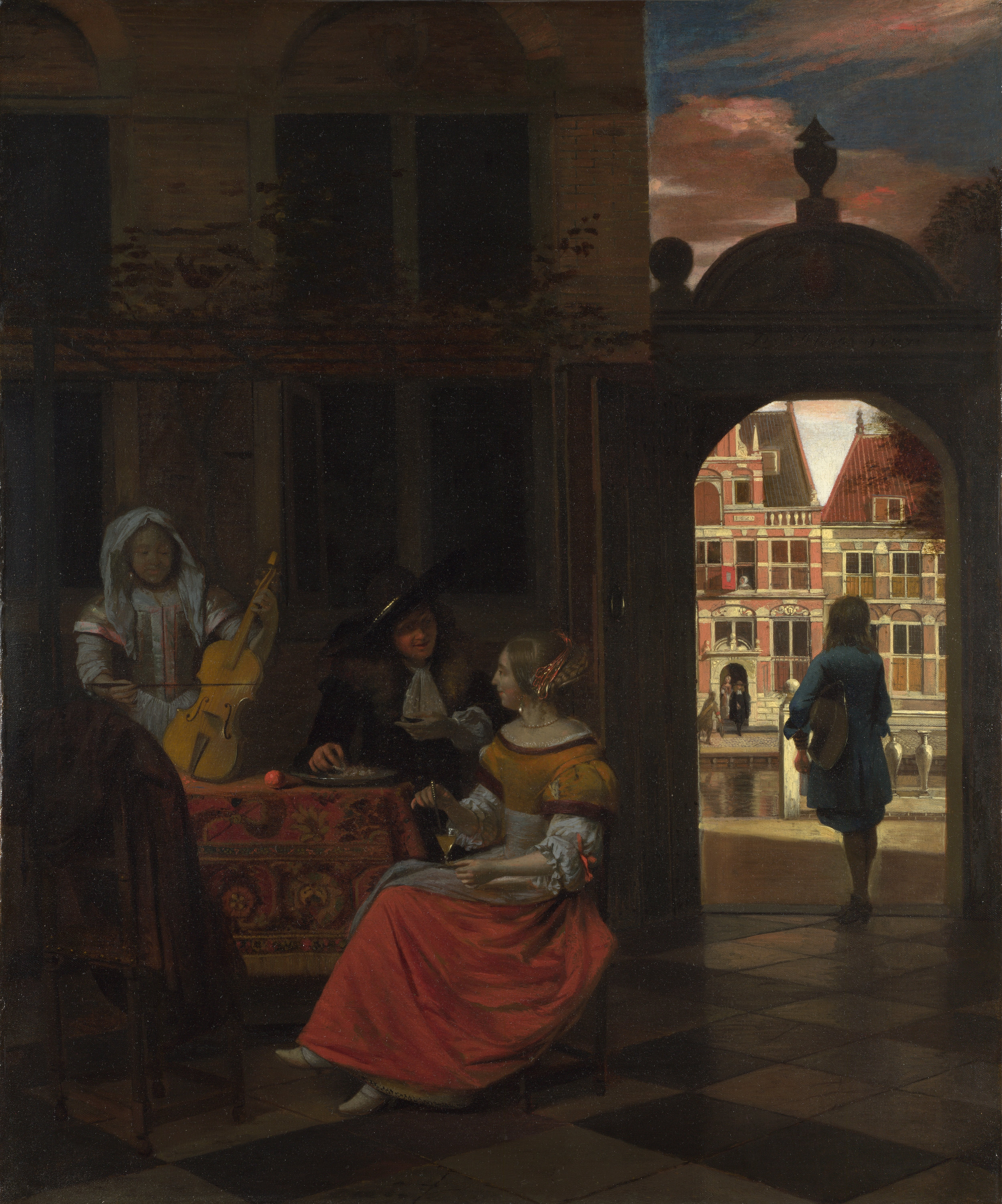
A Musical Party in a Courtyard c. 1677, National Gallery, London.

Additionally, these works are described as appearing lifeless and cumbersome in outline, with a perceived falseness in their structural composition. An anonymous writer in The Connoisseur quoted remarks on late De Hooch, writing, "[He] sacrifices his individuality to the taste of the time."

Upon the acquisition of A Musical Party in a Courtyard by the National Gallery, London in 1916, a debate was provoked in the House of Commons, and the Gallery's Board of Trustees was censured. Writers for The Connoisseur and The Burlington Magazine expressed strong criticism of the artwork, describing the purchase as "an act of folly on the part of the Trustees" and declaring, "Not to mince matters, it is a poor picture, a work of the painter's late and bad period," respectively.

== Legacy ==
Pieter de Hooch's influence persisted under the misnomer of the "De Hooch School." Although there are no records of him having formal students, his work resonated with numerous artists, including van der Burgh and Pieter Janssens Elinga, the latter of whom likely based his painting Woman with a Pearl Necklace on De Hooch's style, with many of his other works reflecting De Hooch's Delft period. Emanuel de Witte is also said to have been influenced by his younger colleague.

The artistic relationship between De Hooch and Ludolf de Jongh remains speculative, as De Jongh was a generation older than De Hooch. Nevertheless, it seems they had a mutual influence. While De Jongh drew inspiration from De Hooch's later depictions of courtyards and gardens, De Hooch may have been inspired by De Jongh in developing the Koortegardjes genre. Some have theorised a triangular artistic relationship between De Hooch, De Jongh, and Jacob Ochtervelt, all native Rotterdammers, evidenced by their distinctive approaches to soldier paintings.

De Hooch's legacy enjoyed a resurgence in the 18th century, as admiration for his work grew. Cornelis Troost, for instance, owned one of his paintings and created portraits in line with De Hooch's Delft period style. Artists such as Abraham van Strij, Jan Ekels the Younger, and Wybrand Hendricks also drew inspiration from this period. Numerous 18th-century drawings after De Hooch's works exist, created by artists like Frans Decker, Cornelis van Noorde, Aert Schouman, Hermanus Numan, and Reinier Vinkeles. His legacy continued to thrive into the 19th century with the formalisation of art evaluation methods, as critic Théophile Thoré-Bürger praised De Hooch in his Salon reviews. This led artists like Jean-François Millet to take a profound interest in his work. As a result, the value of De Hooch's paintings soared, and some works by other Dutch Golden Age artists, such as Vermeer's The Art of Painting, were falsely attributed to De Hooch in order to increase their market price. Marcel Proust also admired De Hooch's interiors, referencing them in Swann's Way to evoke the protagonist's feelings of love. During the 20th century, several works thought to be De Hooch originals were revealed as forgeries, after an unfinished "De Hooch" painting was discovered in Han van Meegeren's studio in 1945.

Art historian Peter C. Sutton argues that De Hooch's later works are largely responsible for the diminished appreciation of his art, advocating that his body of work should be judged without the bias of his weaker, later canvases.

== Gallery ==
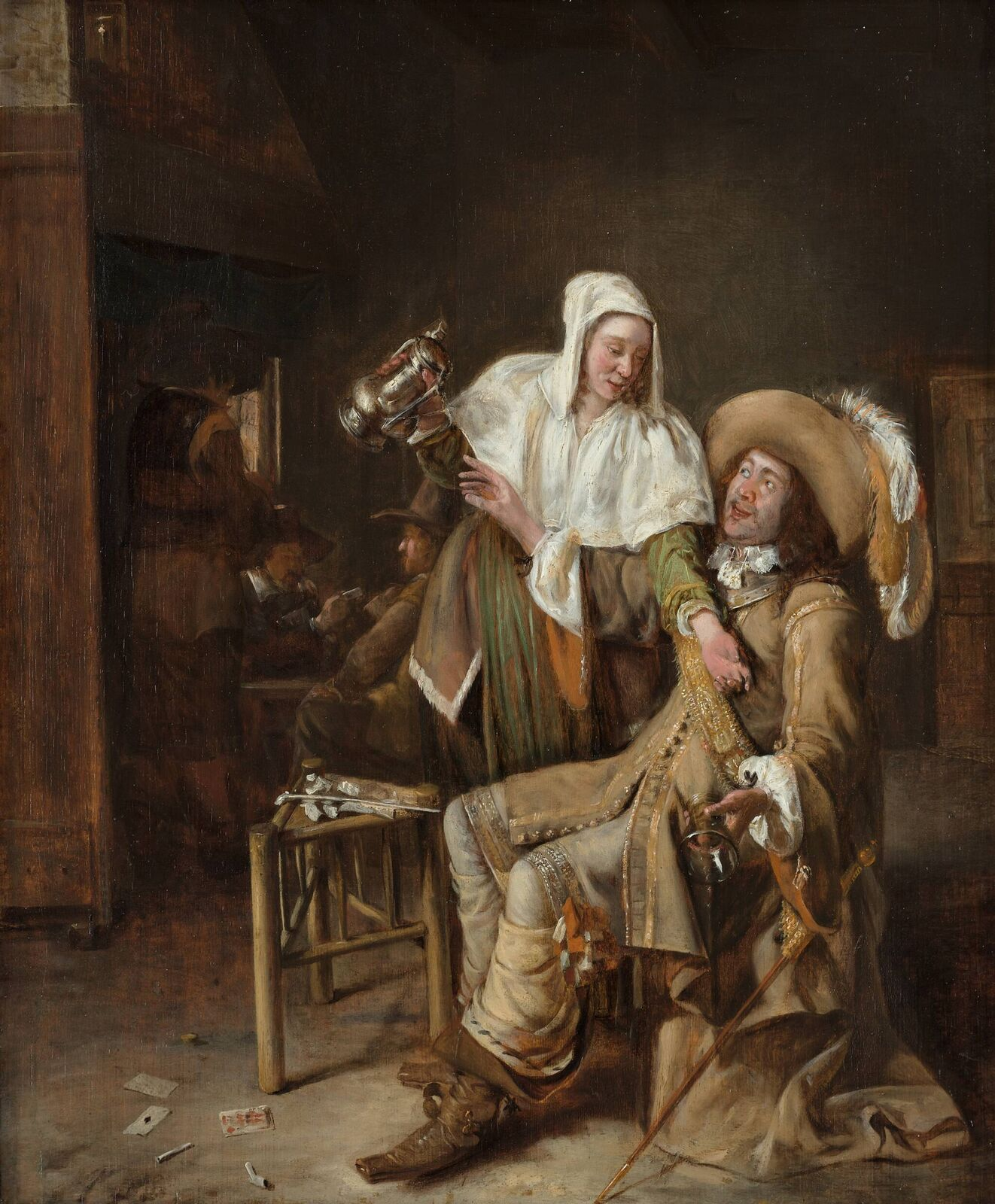
The Empty Glass c. 1652

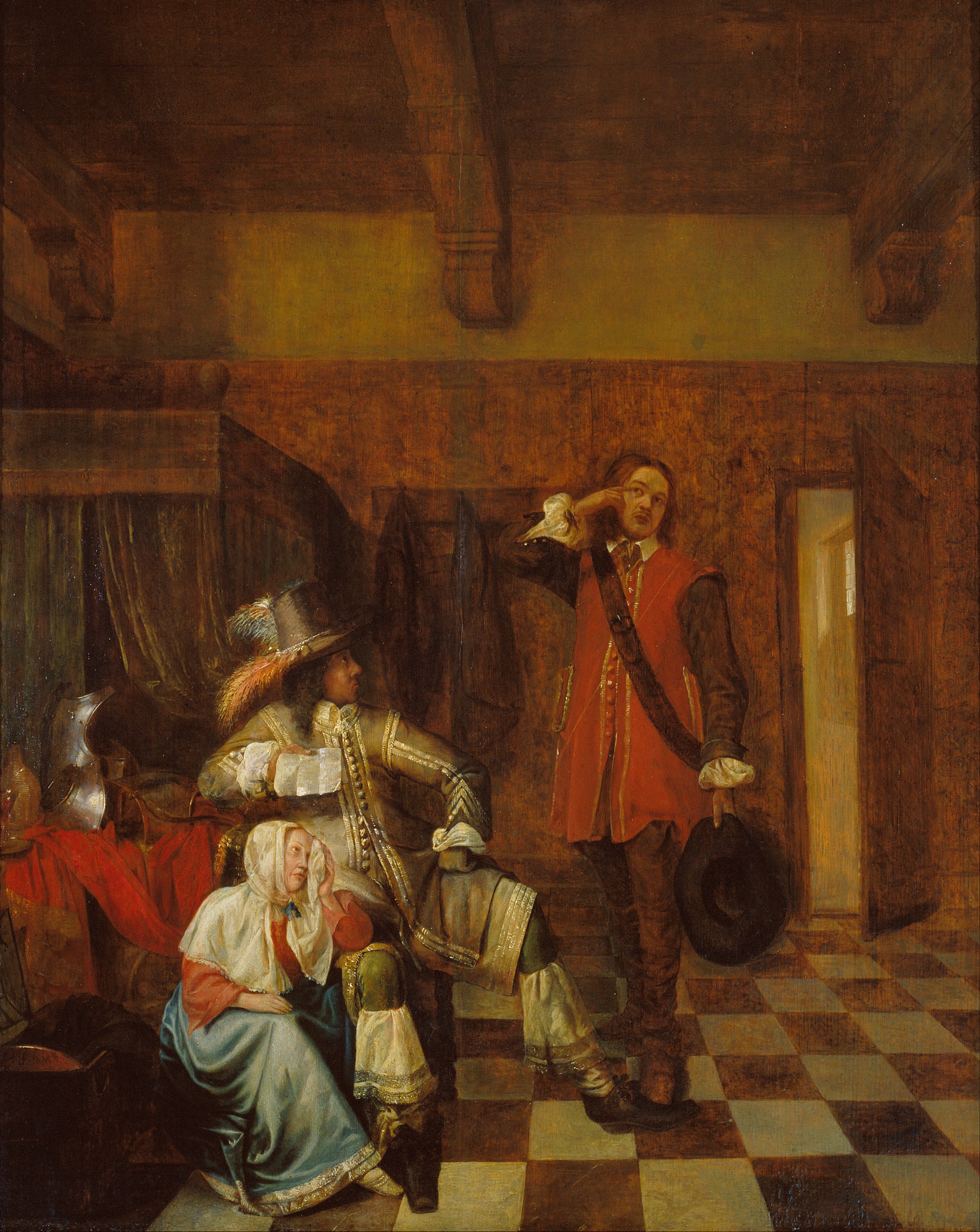
Bringer of Bad News c. 1655

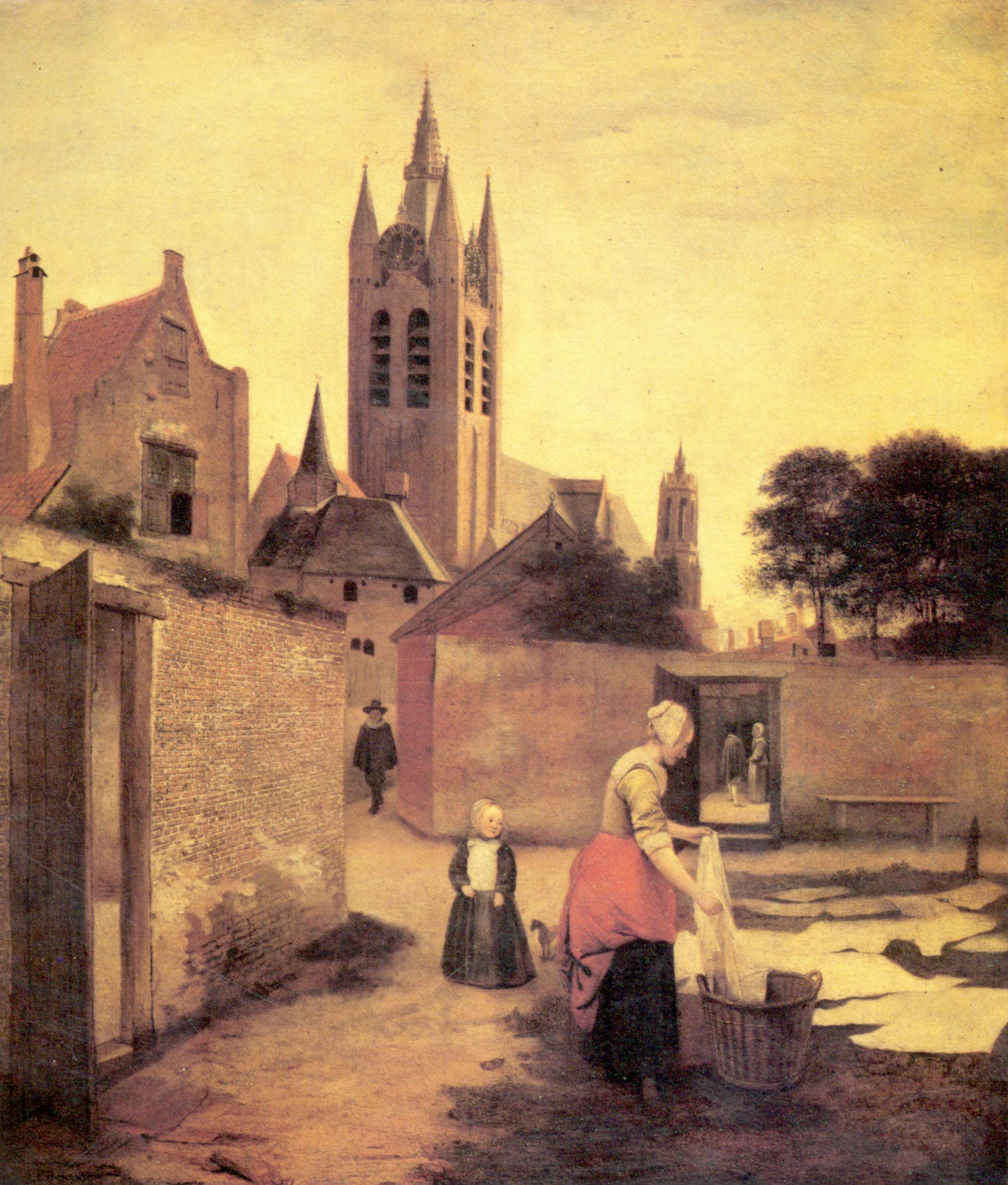
A Woman and Child in a Bleaching Ground c. 1657 – c. 1659

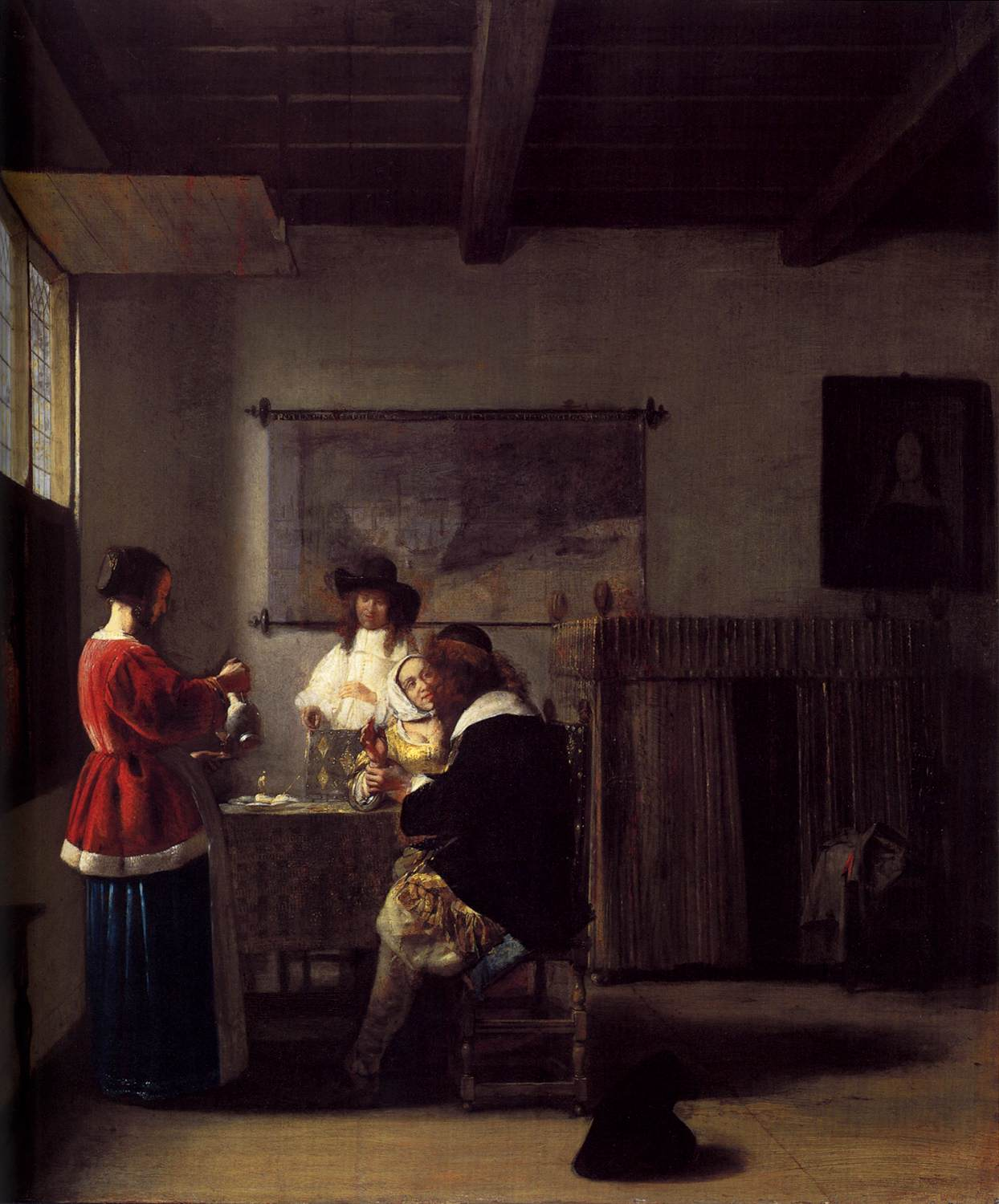
The Visit c. 1657

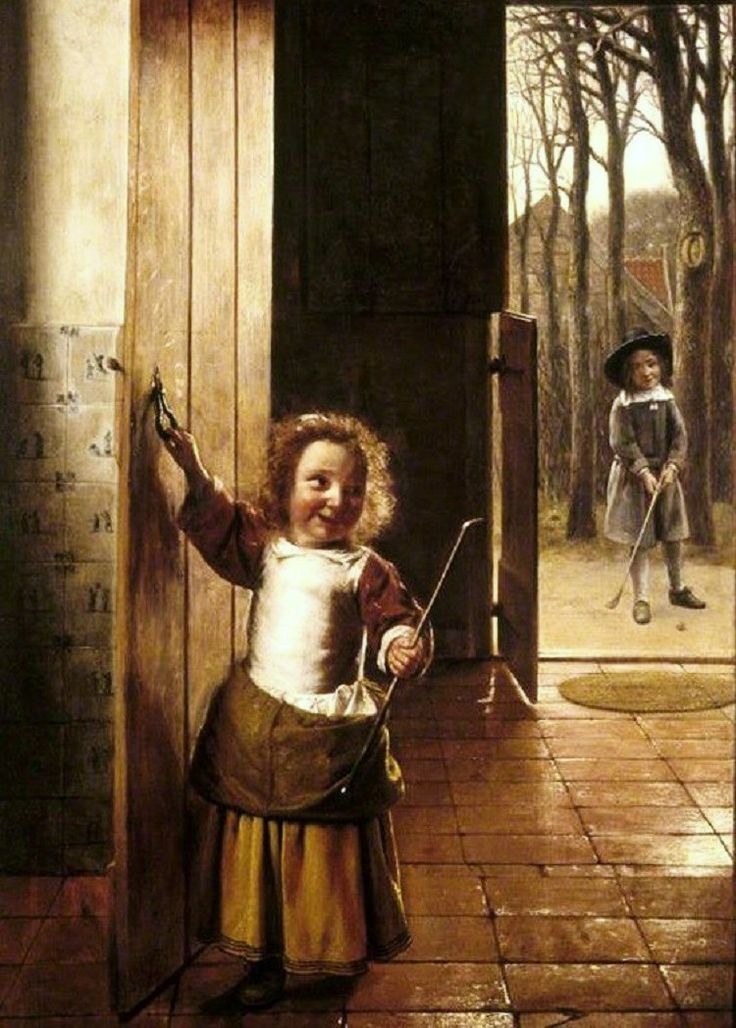
The Golf Players c. 1658

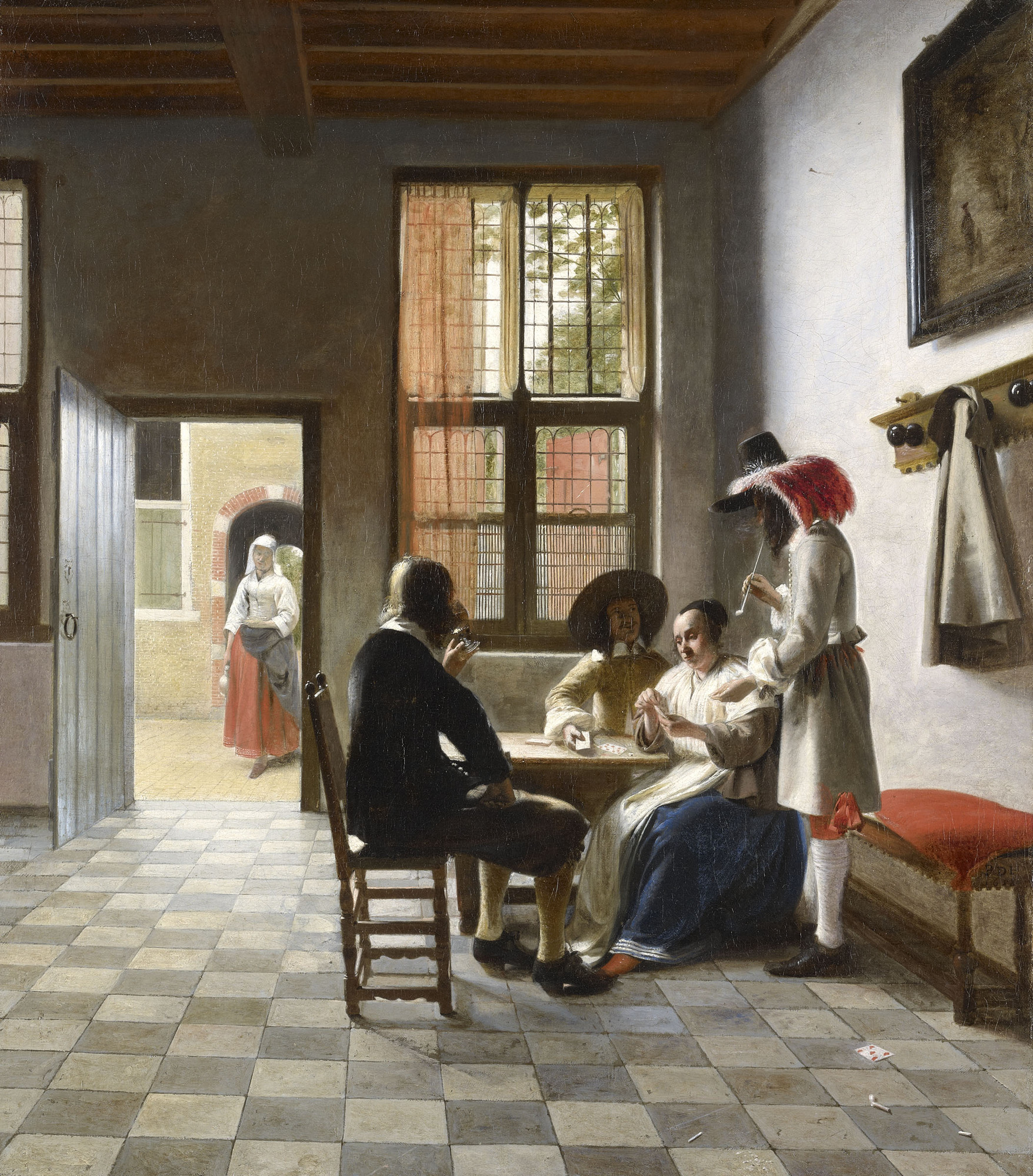
Cardplayers in a Sunlit Room c. 1658

A Dutch Courtyard c. 1658 – c. 1660

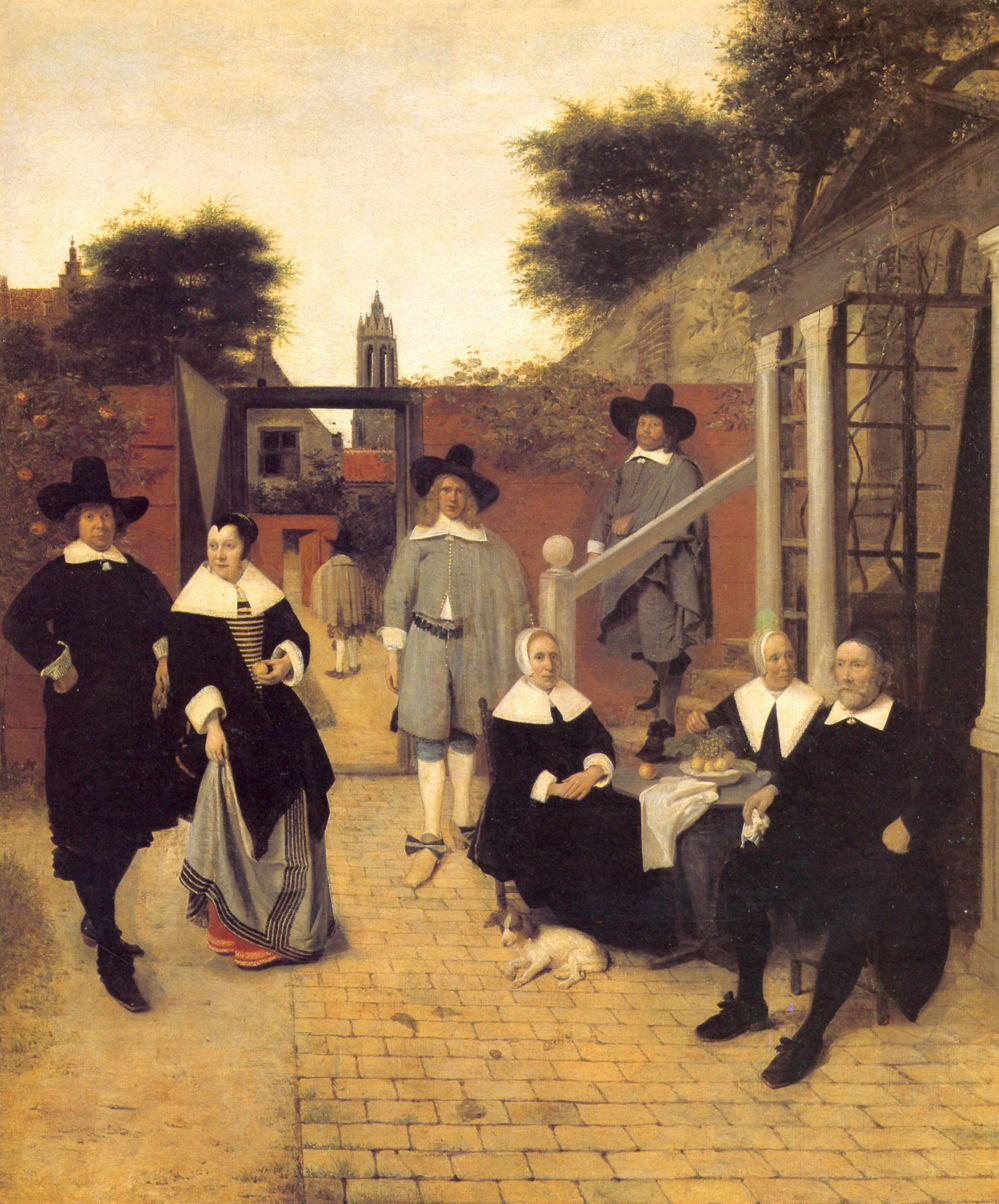
Group portrait of an unknown family or company c. 1650 – c. 1665

A Mother's Duty c. 1658

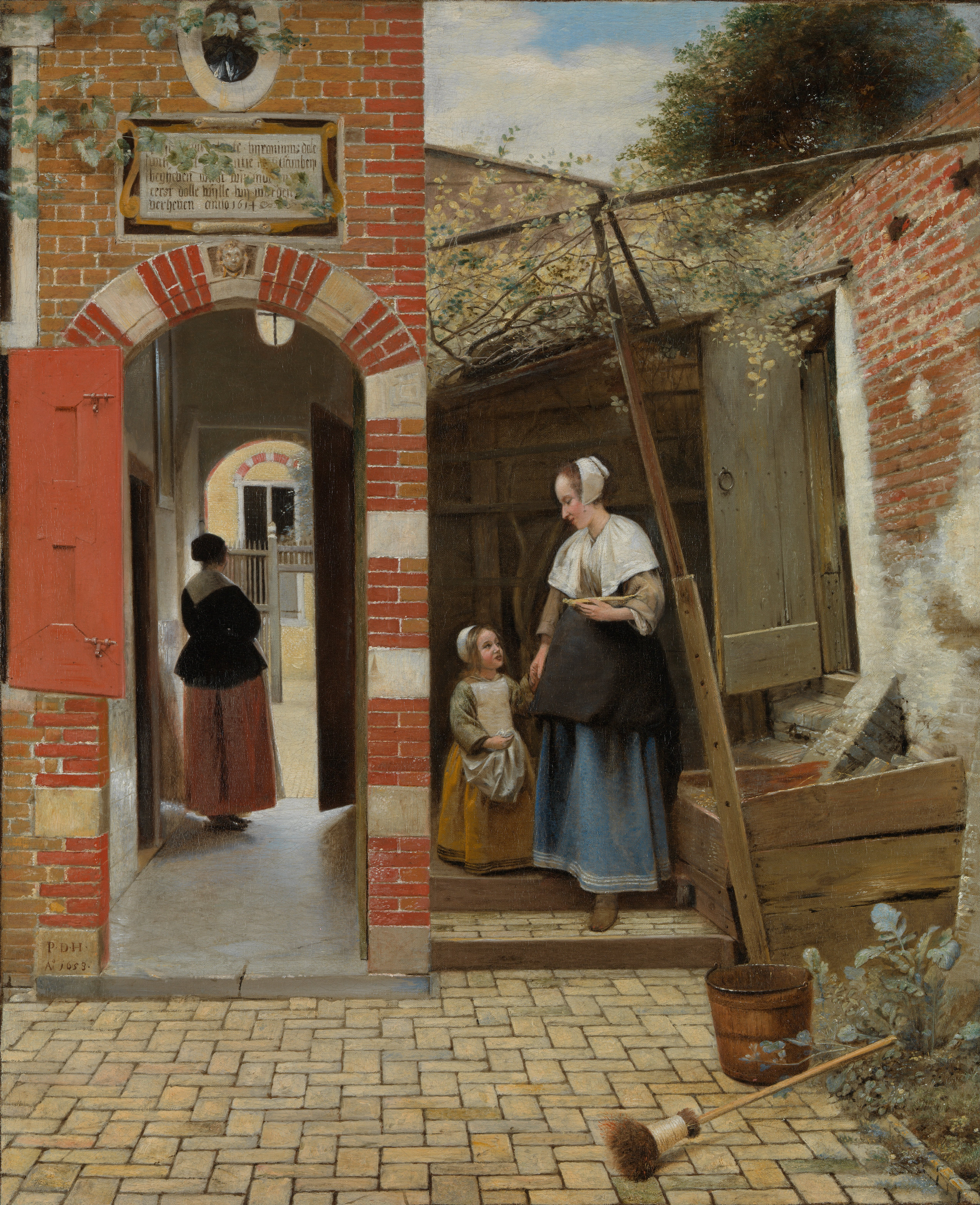
The Courtyard of a House in Delft c. 1658

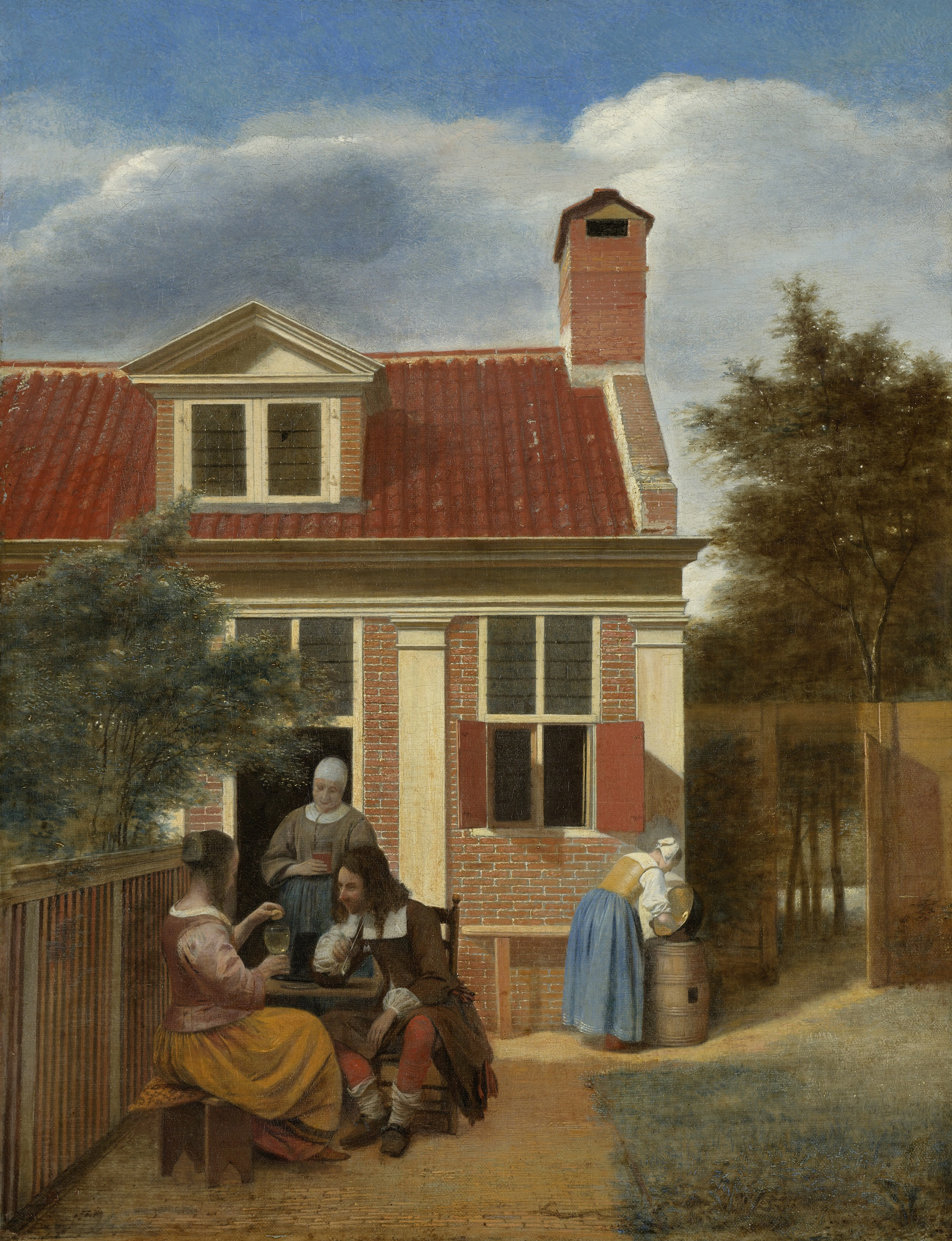
Company in a courtyard behind a house c. 1663

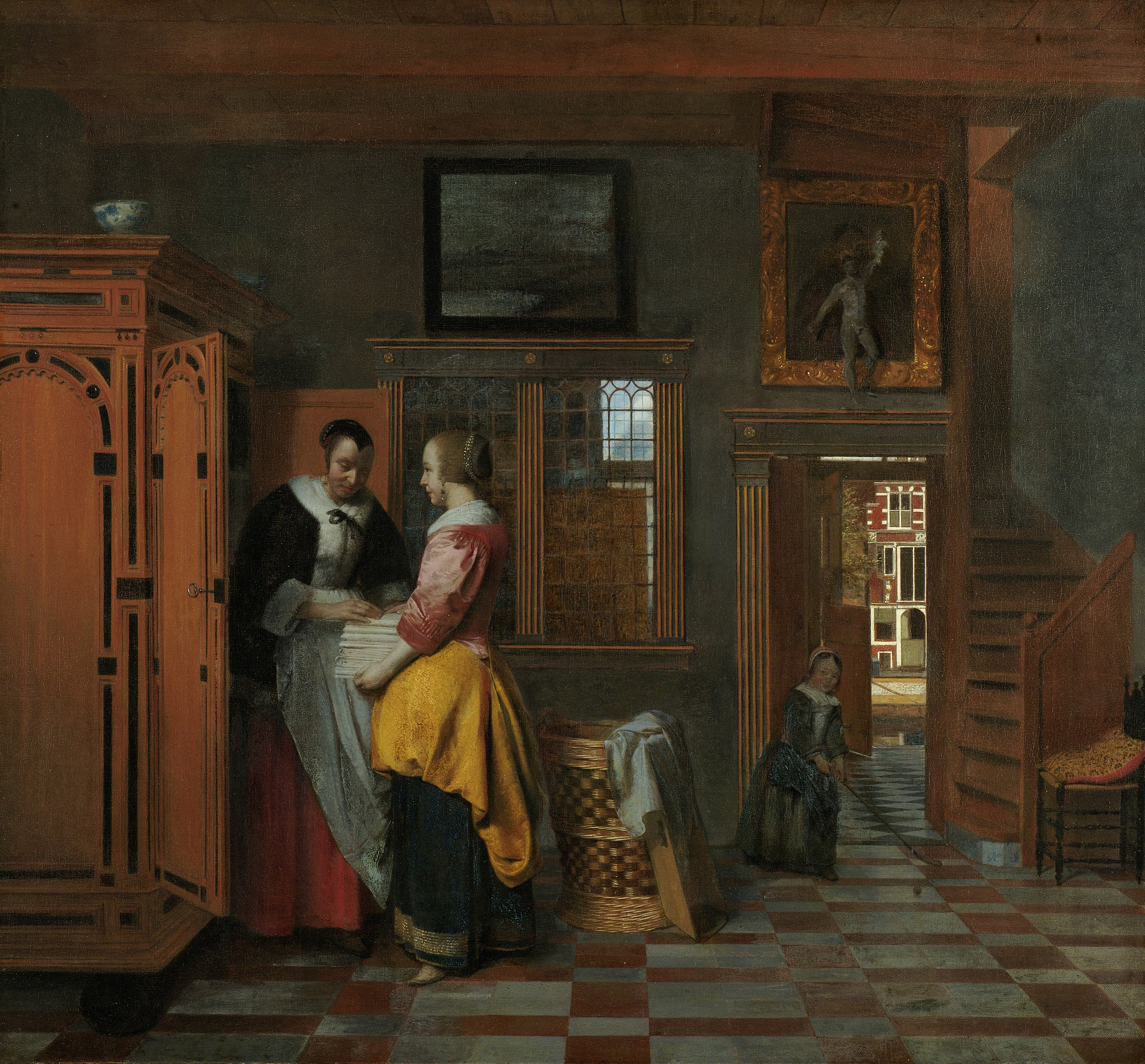
Two Women Beside a Linen Chest, with a Child c. 1663

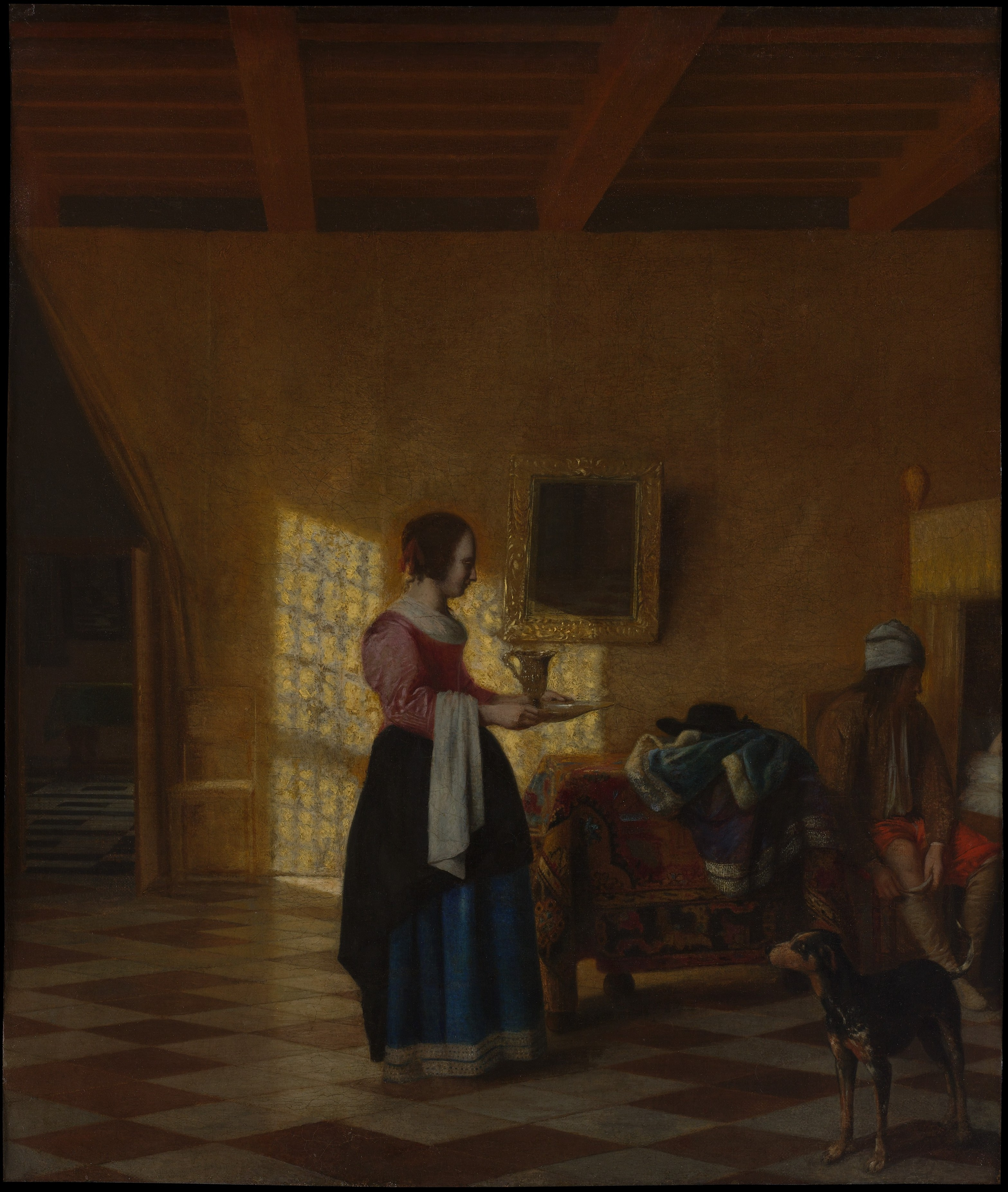
The Maidservant c. 1667

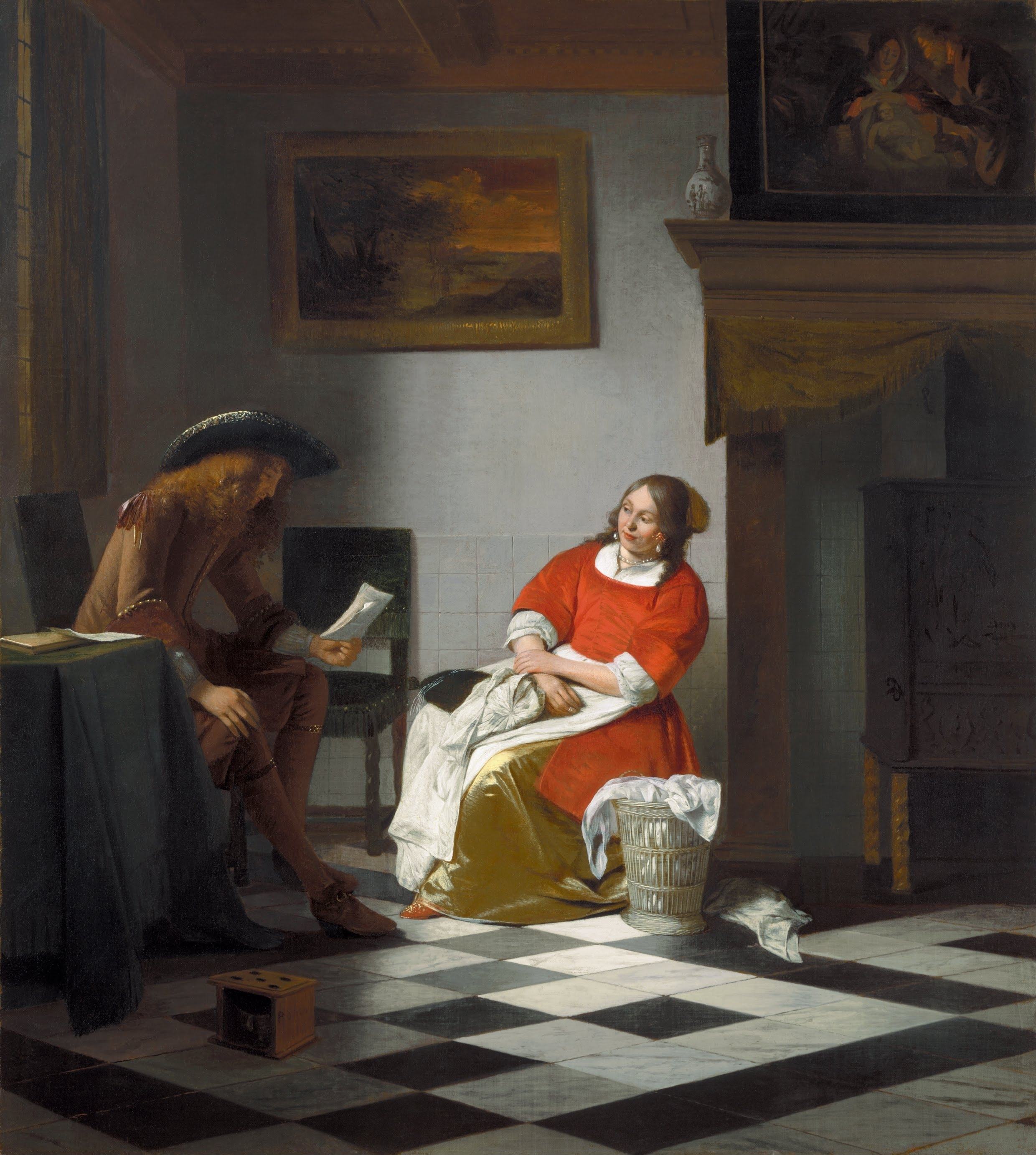
Interior with a Man Reading a Letter and a Woman Sewing c. 1674 – c. 1676

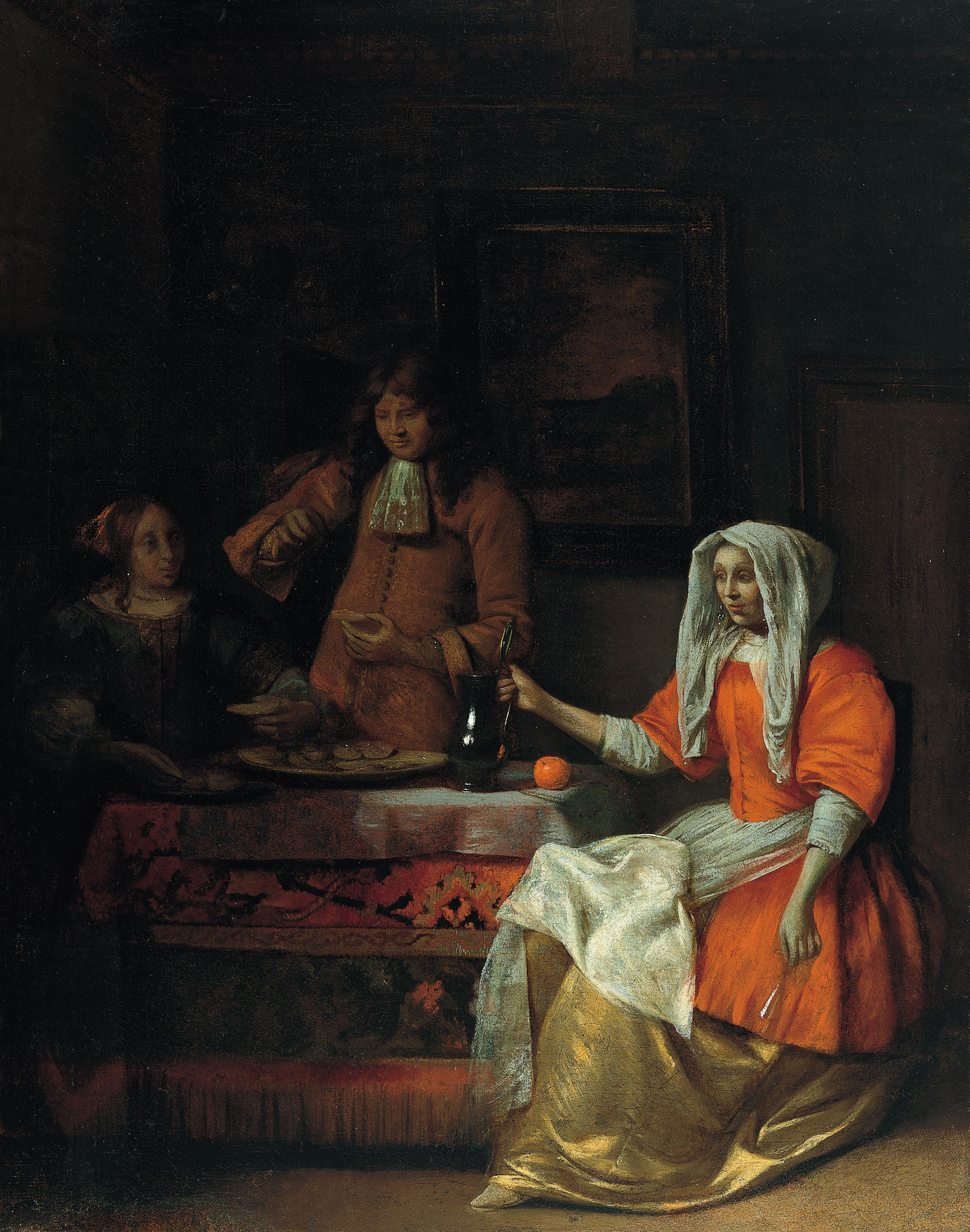
Company in an interior eating oysters c. 1681

== See also ==
- List of paintings by Pieter de Hooch
- Delft School
