= Cartellino =

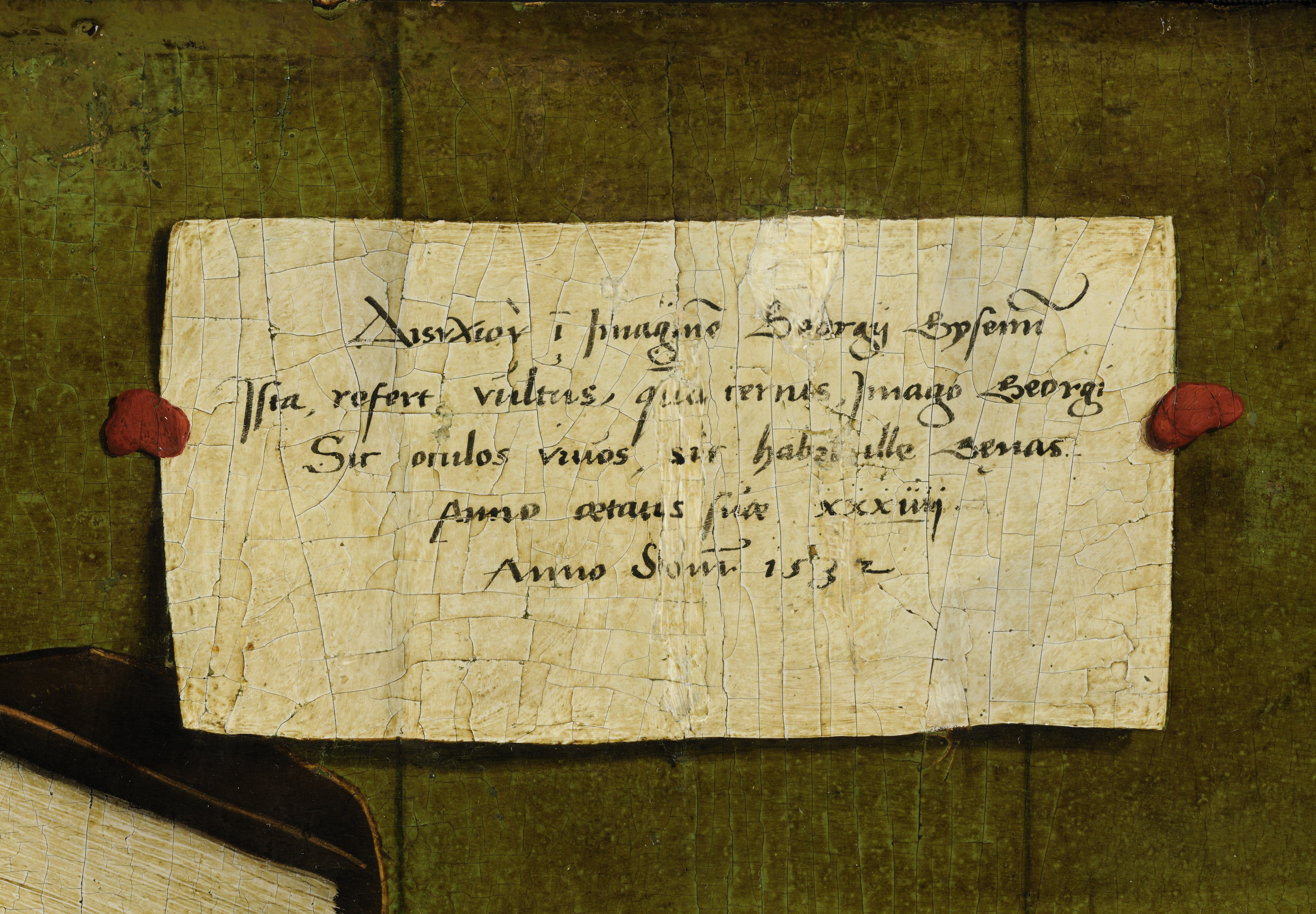
An example of a cartellino, a detail from Holbein's portrait of Georg Giese (below)

Hans Holbein the Younger, Portrait of Georg Giese, 1532

A cartellino (Italian for "small piece of paper") is an illusionistic portrayal of a written note included in painting, mostly with a legend that records the name of the artist, the date, the subject, or some other relevant information about the work. About 500 Renaissance paintings include a cartellino, but the device has been adopted by some later artists.

It usually takes the form of a fictive rectangular scrap of parchment or paper – sometimes with frayed edges, creased or torn – which is depicted as being attached with a pin or wax to a surface that lies parallel to the picture plane, perhaps a foreground parapet or a background wall. Often the cartellino gives the impression of the note being attached to the surface of the painting rather than being part of the artwork itself.

This trompe-l'œil effect may reflect an earlier artistic practice of real notes being physically attached to paintings. Other suggestions of the origins include the inscriptions included in the Early Netherlandish paintings works of Jan van Eyck, such as his 1432 Léal Souvenir, and from the artistic practice at the studio of Francesco Squarcione in Padua, based on the gothic inscriptions seen in medieval paintings.

== History ==
The cartellino appears in Italian Renaissance painting from the 15th century into the 16th century, and particularly in painting from Venice and the Veneto from the 1470s to the 1520s. One of the first cartellini appears on the Tarquinia Madonna by Filippo Lippi, painted in 1437. Other early examples include Andrea Mantegna's 1448 painting of St Mark, and Marco Zoppo's Wimborne Madonna of c.1455. Later examples include Carlo Crivelli's c.1480 Lenti Madonna, Giovanni Bellini's 1501–1502 Portrait of Doge Leonardo Loredan and Jacopo de' Barbari's 1504 Still-Life with Partridge and Gauntlets.

The cartellino fell out of fashion, as artists desired to be known directly from the virtuosic quality of their work, not as craftsmen with a workshop whose work was identified by their name on a label. By 1548, a character in Paolo Pino's Dialogo di pittura was describing the cartellino as a laughable thing. However, there are several cartellini in Hans Holbein the Younger's Portrait of Georg Giese from 1532, and Francisco de Zurbarán included cartellini in about a fifth of his autograph works, including his 1628 painting of Saint Serapion.

In her 2009 PhD thesis, Kandice Rawlings distinguishes the cartellino from other written element including in a painting, such as depictions of inscriptions in stone or on wooden plaques, or writing in books held by subjects, or on streamers or banderoles. Other contemporary terms that were used for the same device include letterina, cartucce, and bolletta – that is, small letter, cartouche, or label. Despite the similarity of the word, there is little evidence of any connection with the cardellino (goldfinch, a symbol of Christ's Passion).

Rawlings documents 412 Italian paintings with cartellini, almost all religious subject or portraits. Early examples are connected with Padua. About three quarters were painted by artists trained or active in Venice and the Veneto. About three quarters were painted between 1470 and 1530, with the largest number in the first decade of the 16th century. About four fifths contain the artist's signature. A third include a date, often alongside a signature. Rawlings identifies another 74 paintings from outside Italy that include cartellini, principally from Germany, mainly Albrecht Dürer in the early 16th century, England, mainly Holbein in the mid-1500s, and Spain, mainly El Greco in the late 16th and early 17th century, Velázquez in the 1630s, and Zurbarán as late as the 1660s.

The cartellino had a knowing revival in Diego Rivera's 1915 Zapatista Landscape.

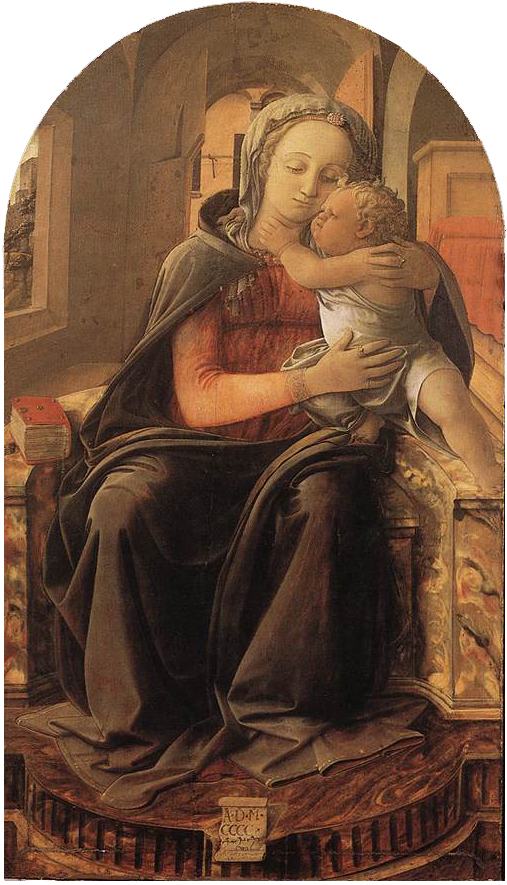
Filippo Lippi, Madonna of Tarquinia, 1437

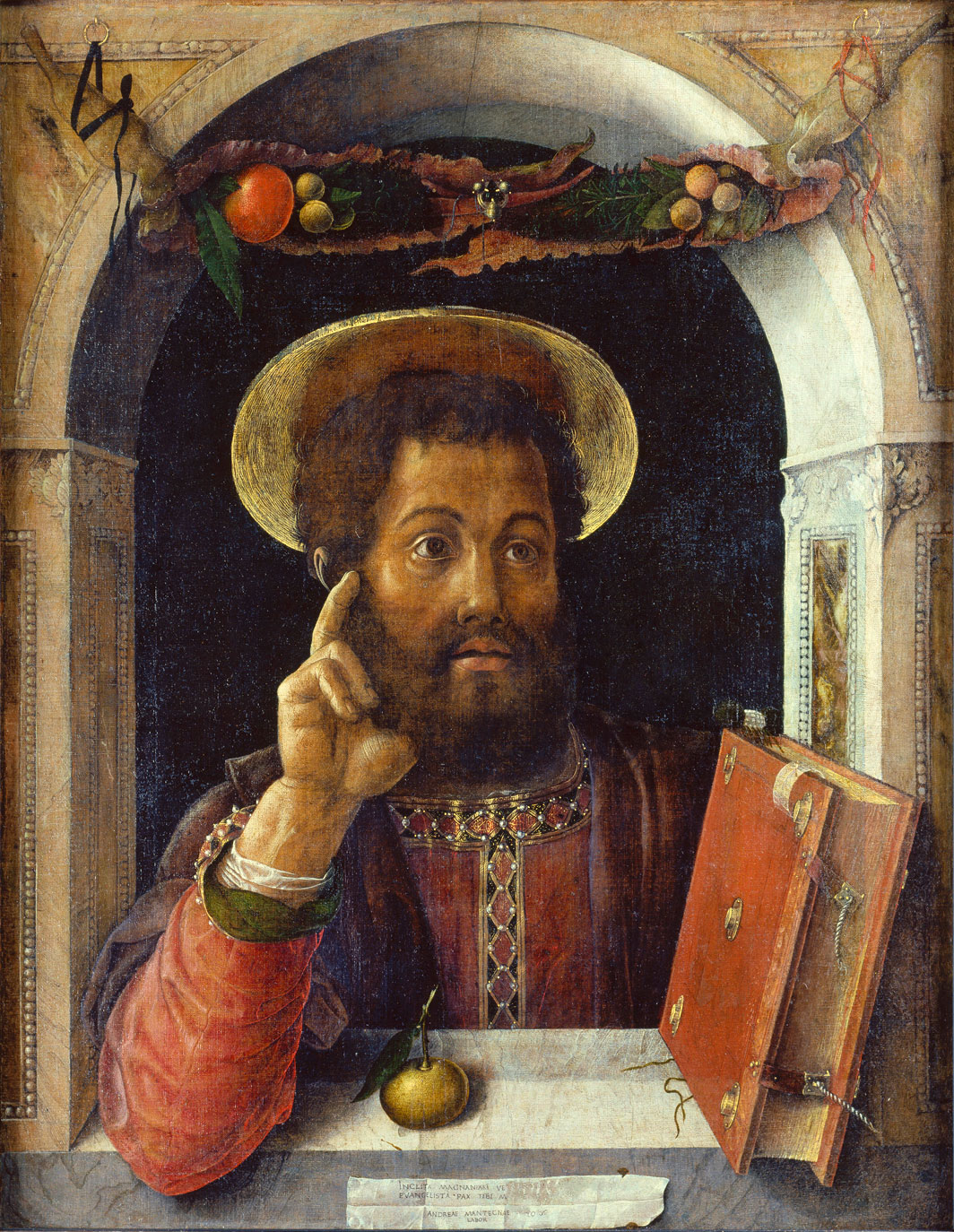
Andrea Mantegna, St Mark, 1448

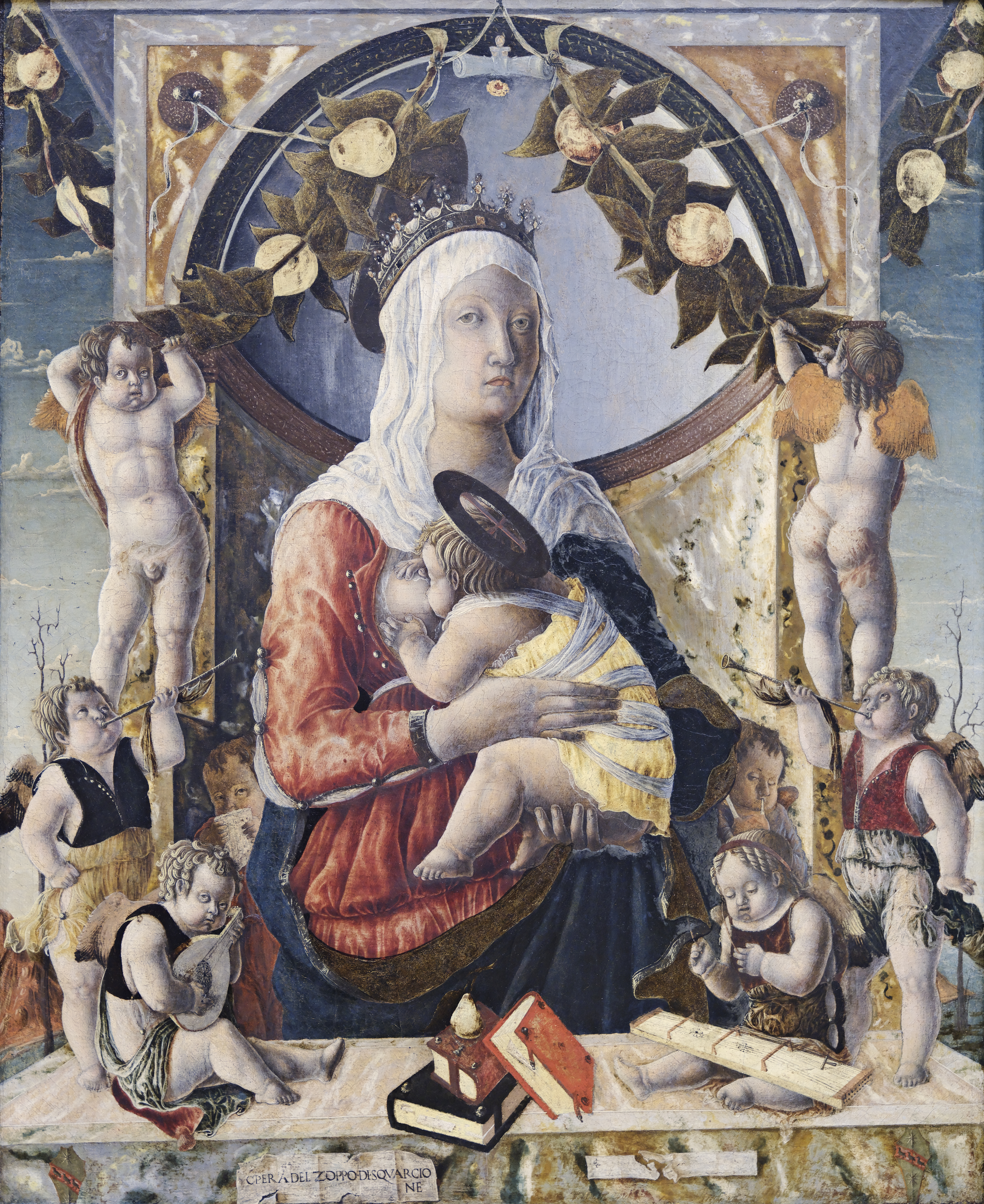
Marco Zoppo, Wimborne Madonna, c.1455

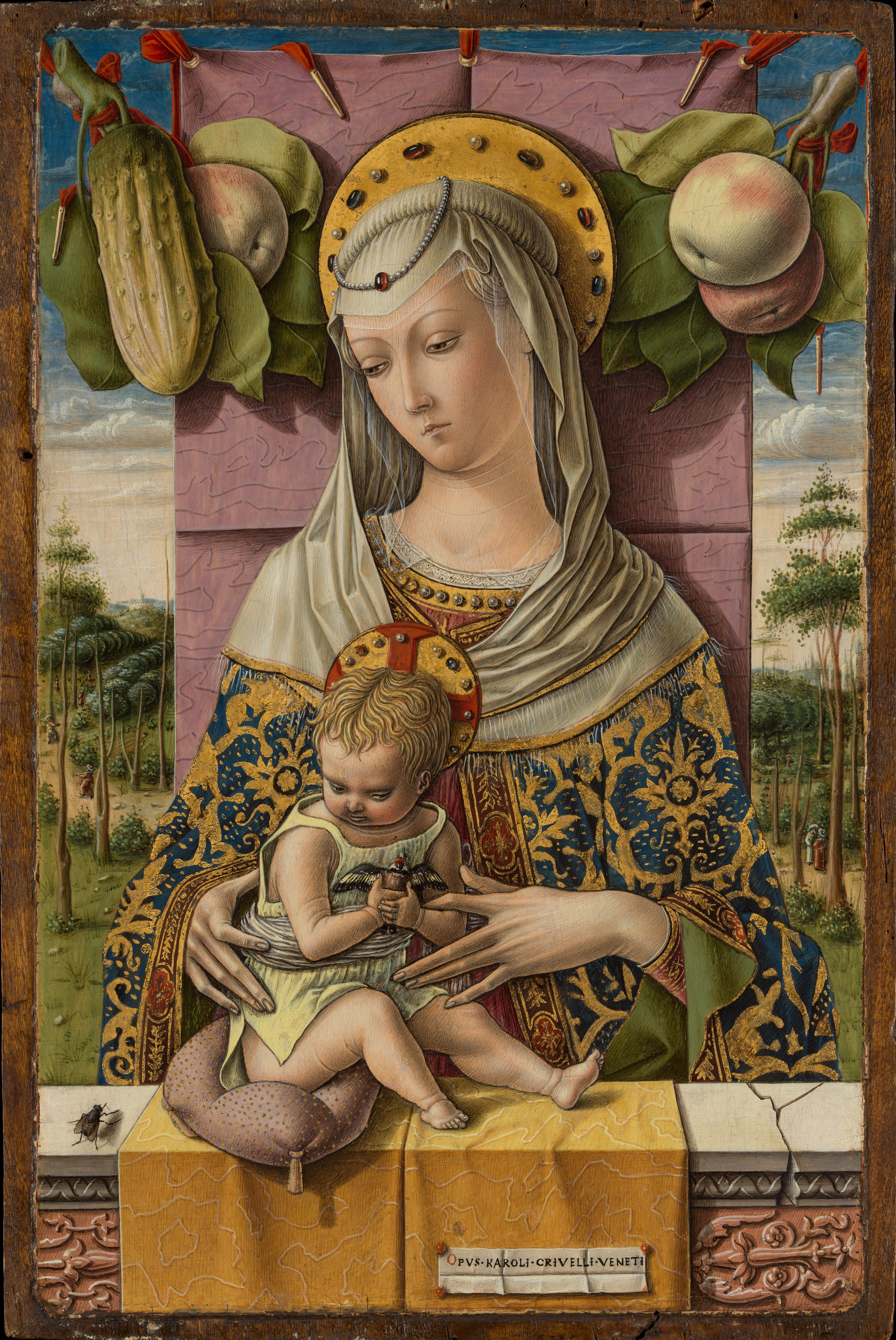
Carlo Crivellia, Lenti Madonna, c.1480

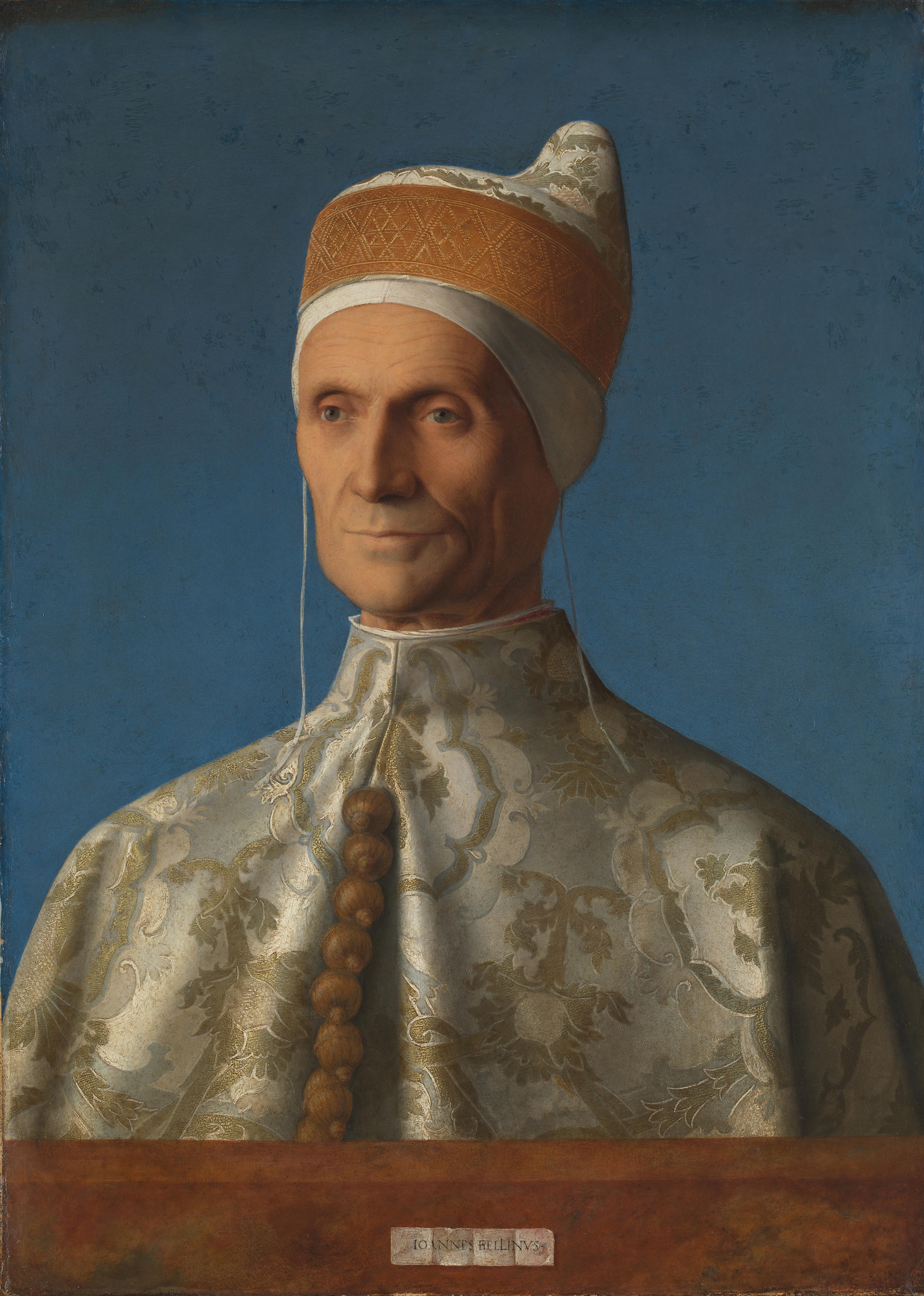
Giovanni Bellini, Portrait of Doge Leonardo Loredan, 1501-2

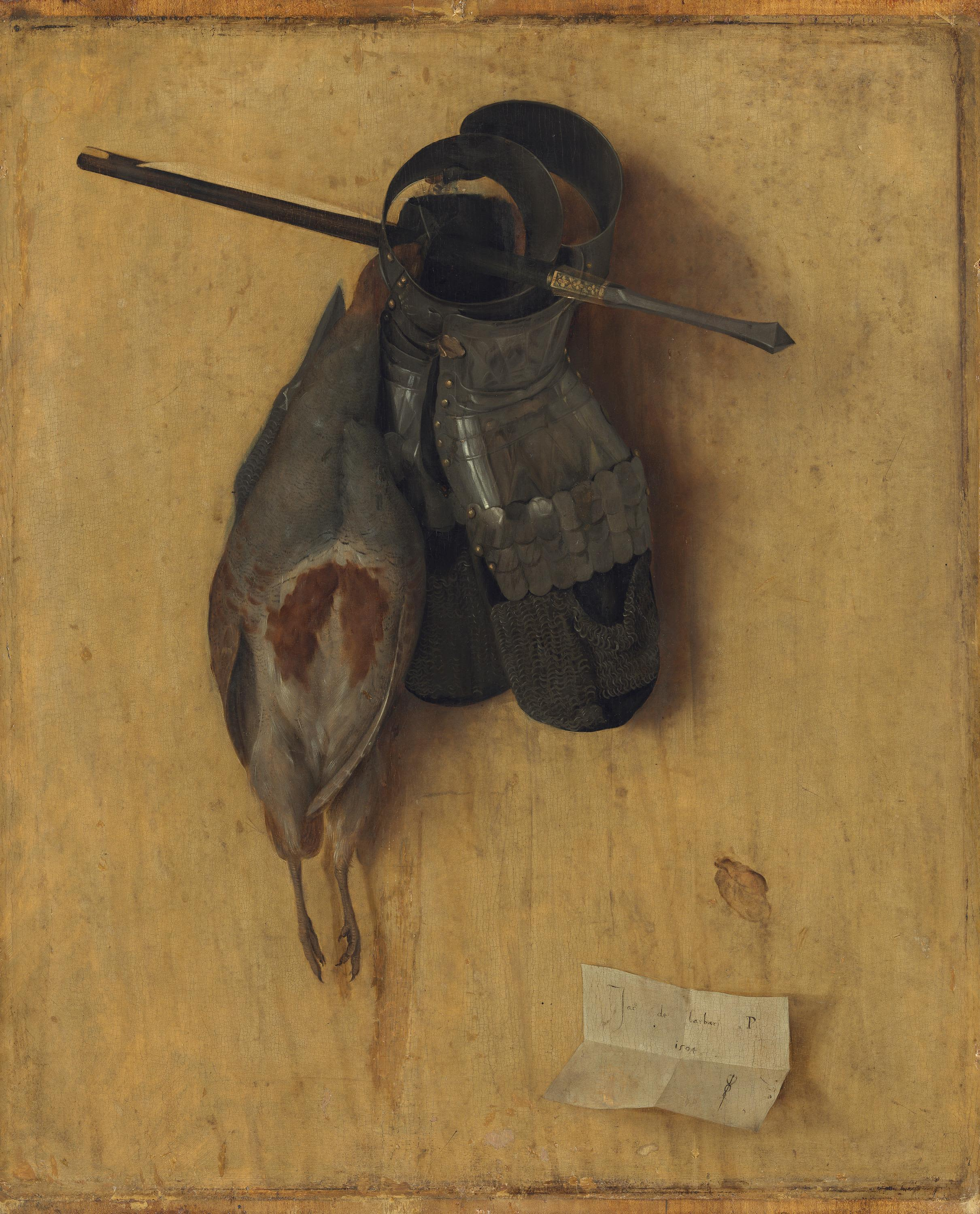
Jacopo de' Barbari, Still-Life with Partridge and Gauntlets, 1504

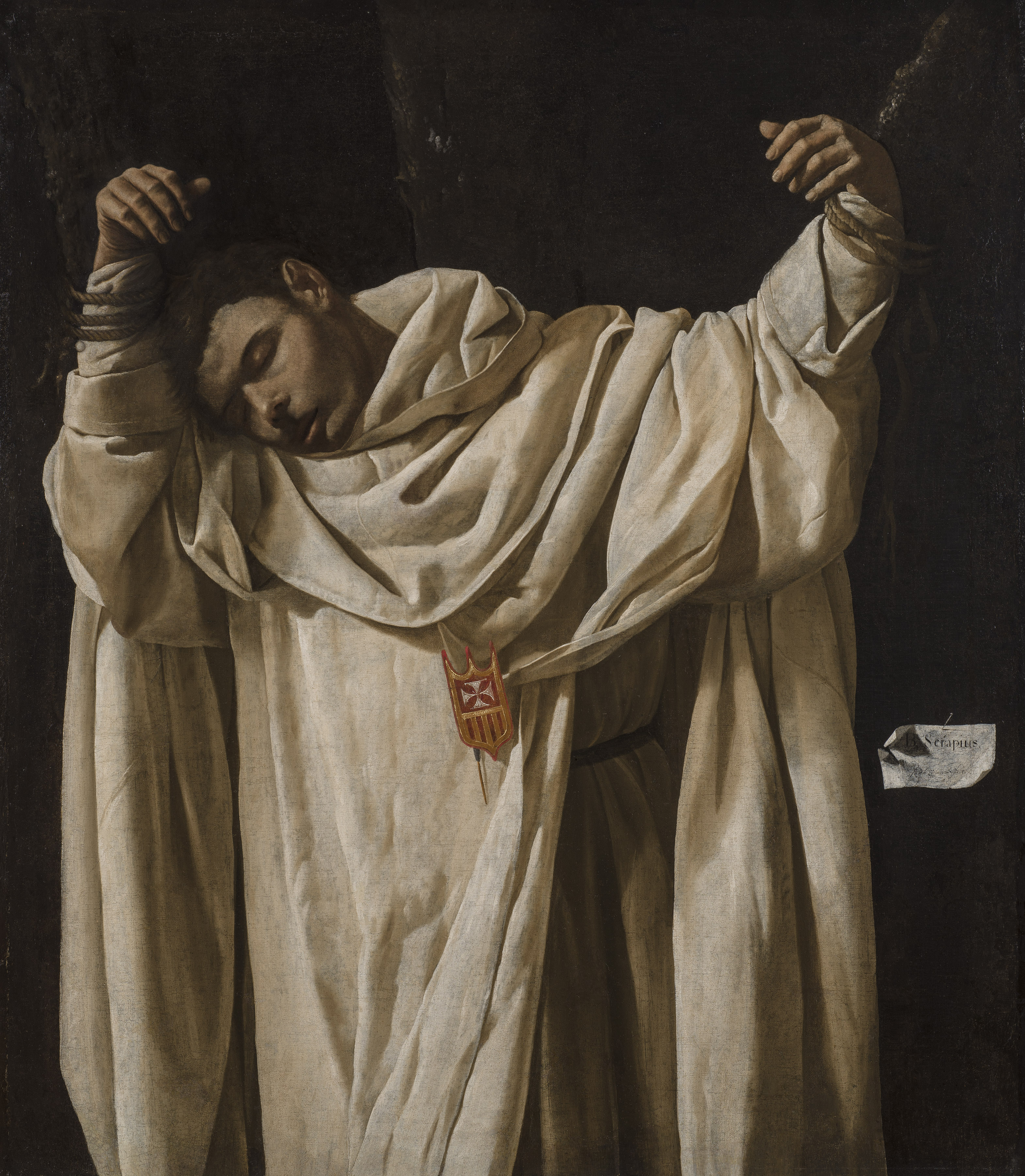
Francisco de Zurbarán, Saint Serapion, 1628

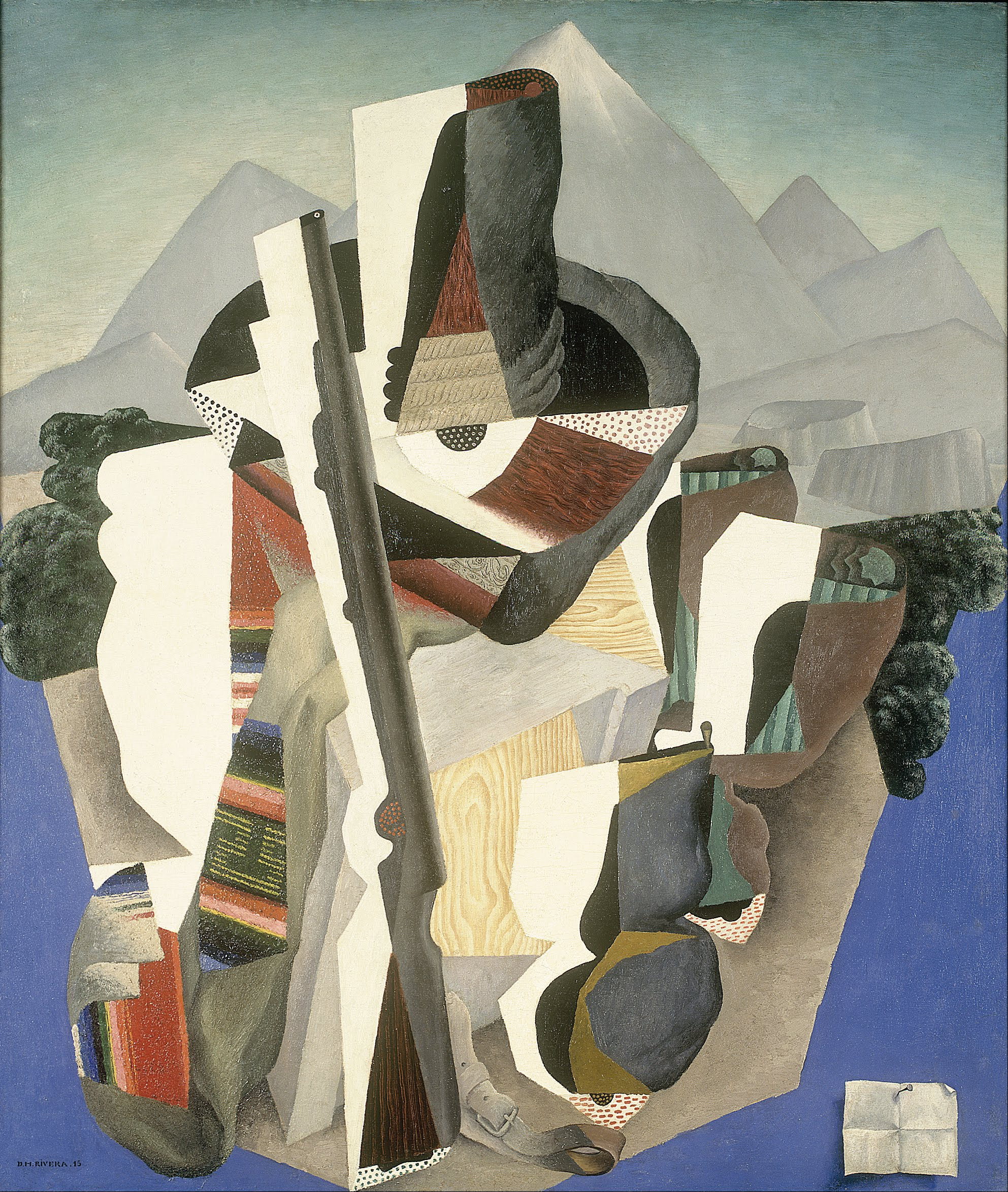
Diego Rivera, Zapatista Landscape, 1915

== See also ==
- Museum label
- Musca depicta
