= San Giovanni Battista, Pesaro =

Church in Pesaro, Marche, Italy

Coordinates: 43°56′32″N 12°46′26″E

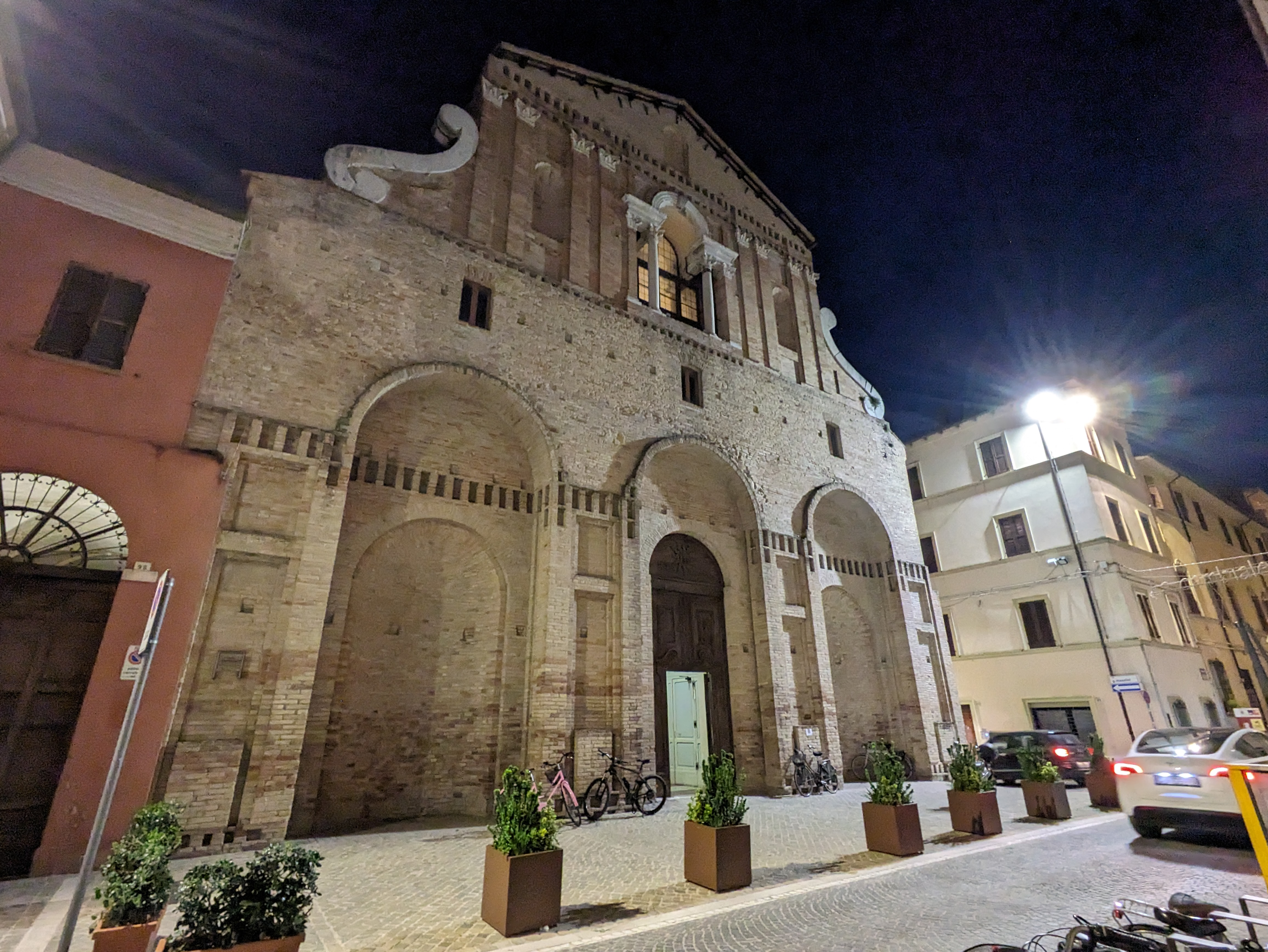
Façade

San Giovanni Battista is a church located on Via Passeri #98 in central Pesaro, region of Marche, Italy.

== History ==
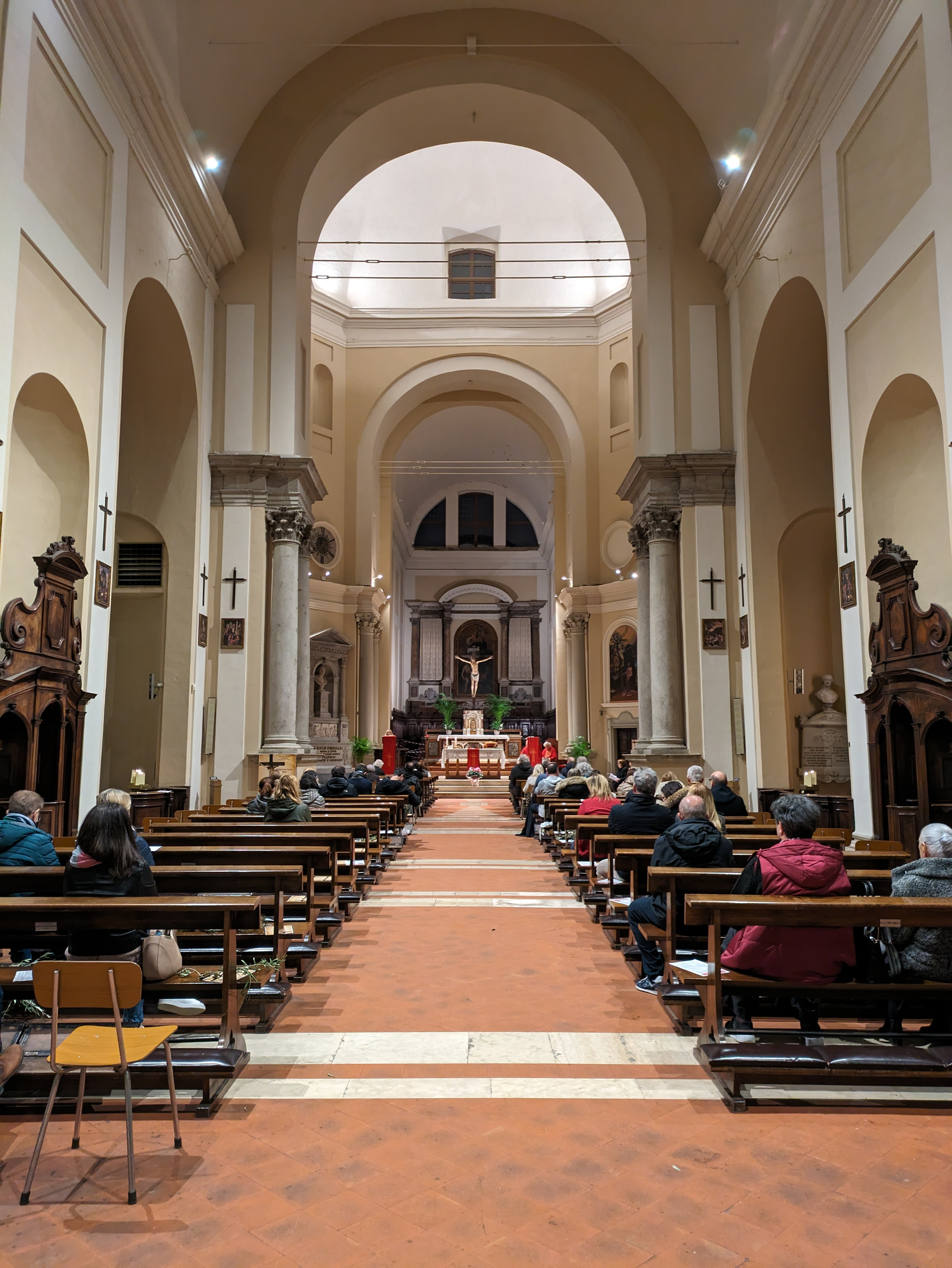
Interior

The church was erected on the site of a former mausoleum constructed by Alessandro Sforza, and which was razed in 1536 by the Duke Francesco Maria I Della Rovere. The church and an adjacent convent were commissioned in 1543 by the Franciscan Minorites of Osservanza.

The original plan was by Girolamo Genga, but on his death in 1551, work proceeded under his son Bartolomeo. Paucity of funds meant construction on the church continued till formal consecration in 1656. The facade remains unfinished.

The interiors underwent refurbishment in the 17th century, with the elimination of some of the lateral altars. The church housed tombs for many of the prominent families of Pesaro, including the Almerici, Antaldi, Baldassini, Gavardini, and Perticari.

The suppression of the Augustinians in 1860 expelled the monks, and in 1867, the church and convent were ceded to the city and converted to military use, including the storage of military materials during World War I. Graudal attempts by local worhsippers to obtain the cession of the church were ultimately successful in 1926. In 1975, it was again ceded to the frati Minori.

An inventory from 1864 lists the following artworks in the nave and flanking chapels:

- Nativity with Adoration of Shepherds by a follower of Giulio Cesare Begni.
- Santissima Annunziata di Firenze (1544) by Giovanni Battista Clarici.
- Madonna and child with Saints Lucy, John the Baptist, and St Francis (19th century) by P. Atanasio of Rimini.
- Dead Christ with Angels and Head of John the Baptist attributed to Marco Zoppo, found in sacristy.
