= Lazara Altarpiece =

c. 1450 painting by Francesco Squarcione

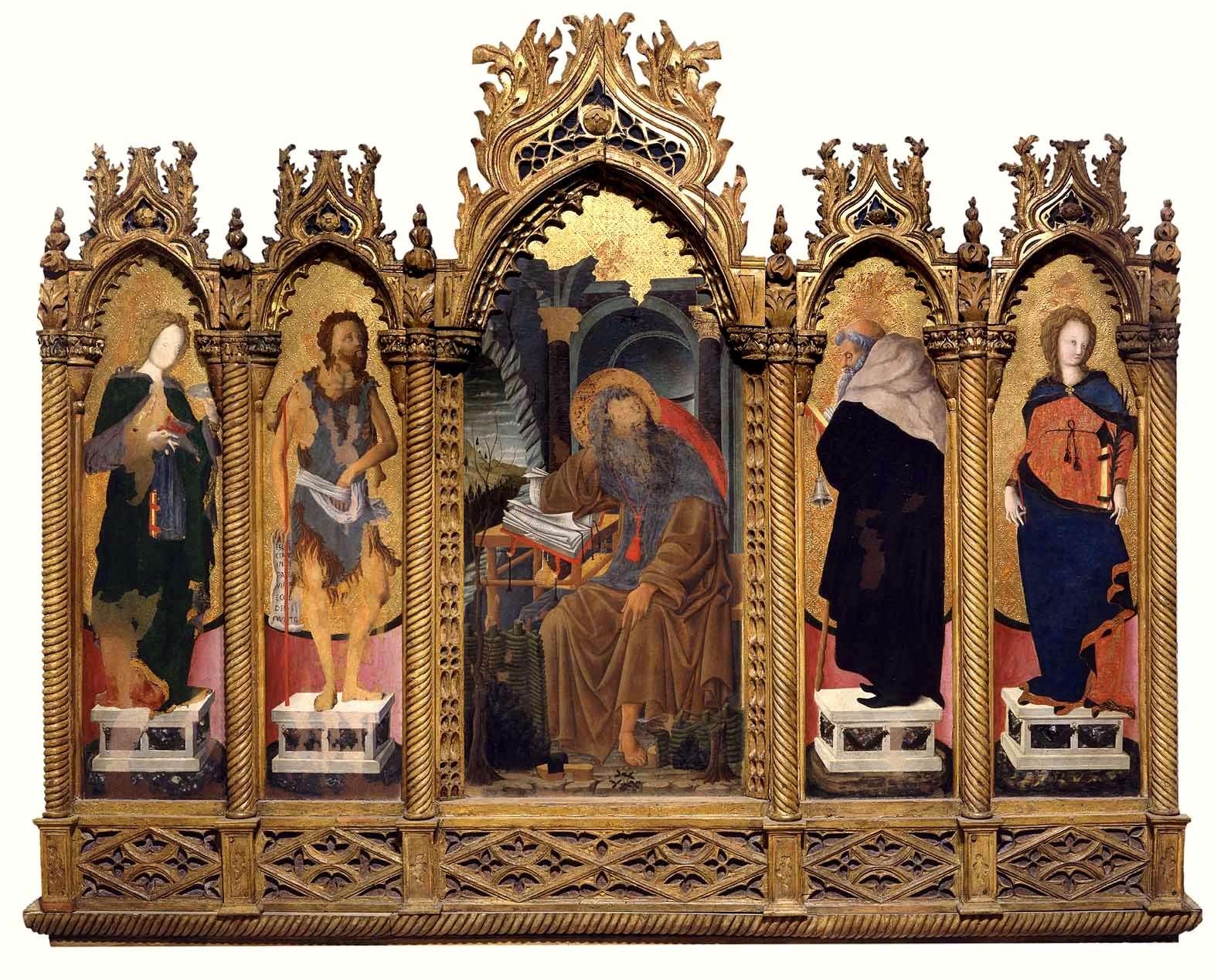

The Lazara Altarpiece (Italian - Polittico de Lazara) is a 1449-1452 five-panel tempera on panel altarpiece by Francesco Squarcione, signed by the artist and now in the Musei Civici of Padua. It and his Madonna and Child are his only two definitively confirmed works.

It was begun for Leone de Lazara's family chapel in Santa Maria del Carmine, Padua, with a central panel of Saint Jerome in his study and four side panels showing saints Lucy, John the Baptist, Anthony Abbot and Justina of Padua.
