= Wimborne Madonna =

1455 painting by Marco Zoppo

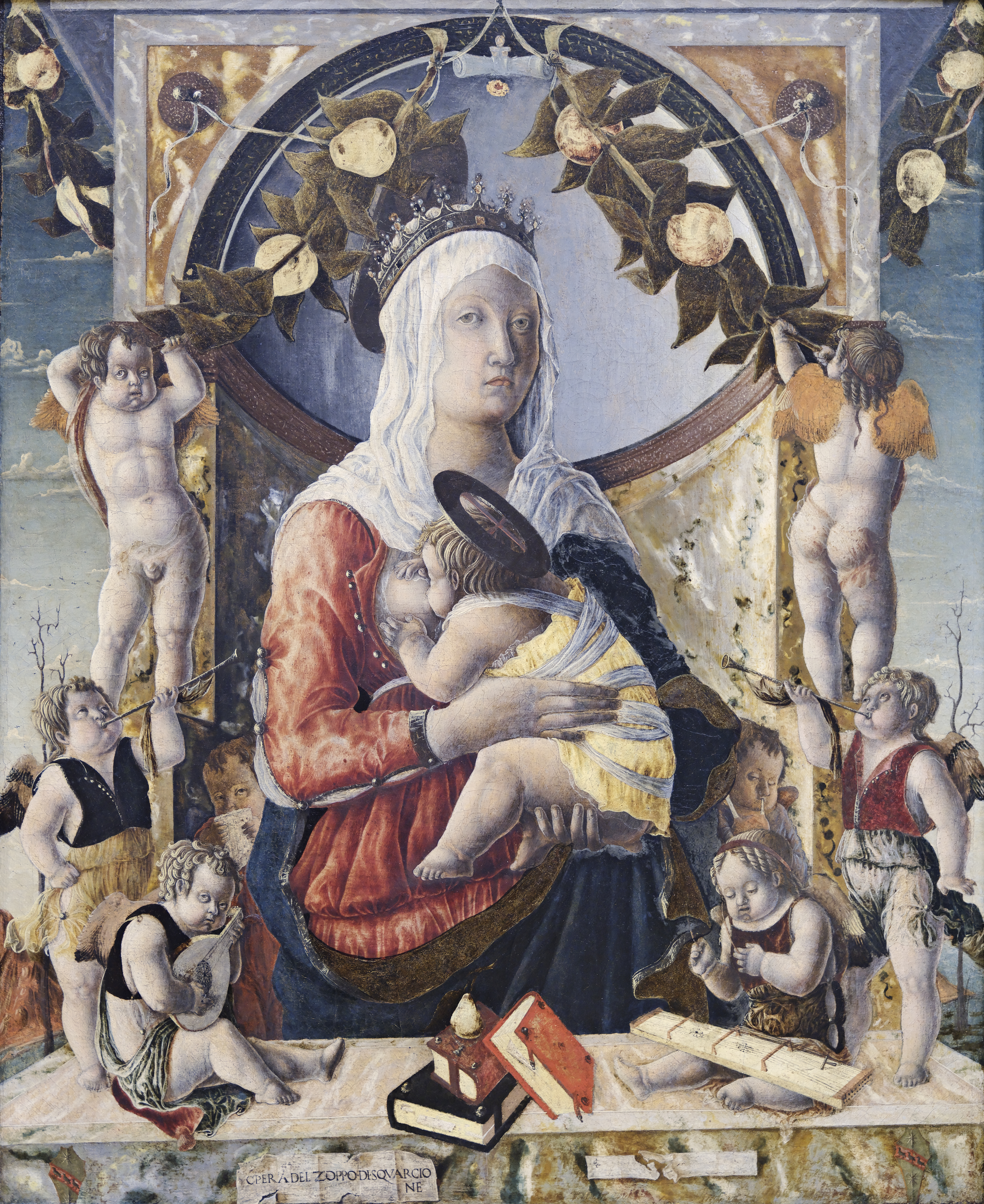
Marco Zoppo, Winborne Madonna, 1455, Louvre

The Wimborne Madonna, also known as the Madonna del Latte ("Madonna of the milk") or La Vierge allaitant l'Enfant avec huit anges musiciens ("Virgin nursing the Child with eight angel musicians"), is an oil painting by the Italian Renaissance artist Marco Zoppo, dated to 1455. It was owned by Lord Wimborne and displayed at Canford Manor in the 19th century, and has been held by the Louvre in Paris since 1980.

The work measures 89 cm × 72 cm (35 in × 28 in). It was painted on a wooden board and transferred to canvas in the 18th century. The artist's signature, on a cartellino to the left at the bottom of the painting, indicates the work was made in 1455 when Marco Zoppo was working in the workshop of Francesco Squarcione in Padua: "OPERA DEL ZOPPO DI SQUARCIONE". A second cartellino to the right is not legible.

The painting depicts the Virgin Mary nursing the Christ Child. Mary is standing behind a marble parapet and in front of an elaborate marble niche decorated with garlands of fruits and leaves. She is wearing a red dress with blue cloak, and a white headcovering with a crown. She is holds the infant Jesus up in her arms, with the baby stooping to suckle from her uncovered right breast. On the marble ledge in front of the central pair are a pile of books and a pear, and to either sides are groups of cherubs playing musical instruments, with two cherubs reaching up to the garlands. In the background to either side are views of a landscape and a sky with scattered clouds.

The painting may have been made for the Dardini family, based in Venice but also established in Verona and Padua, whose coat of arms is depicted at each end of the parapet. It was in the Palazzo Manfrin in the 19th century, from where it was acquired in 1868 by Sir Ivor Bertie Guest, 2nd Baronet (later 1st Baron Wimborne) and displayed at Canford Manor. It was sold by his descendants in 1980, and acquired by the Louvre.

== See also ==
- Nursing Madonna
