= Serapion of Algiers =

English Roman Catholic saint

Saint Serapion of Algiers OdeM
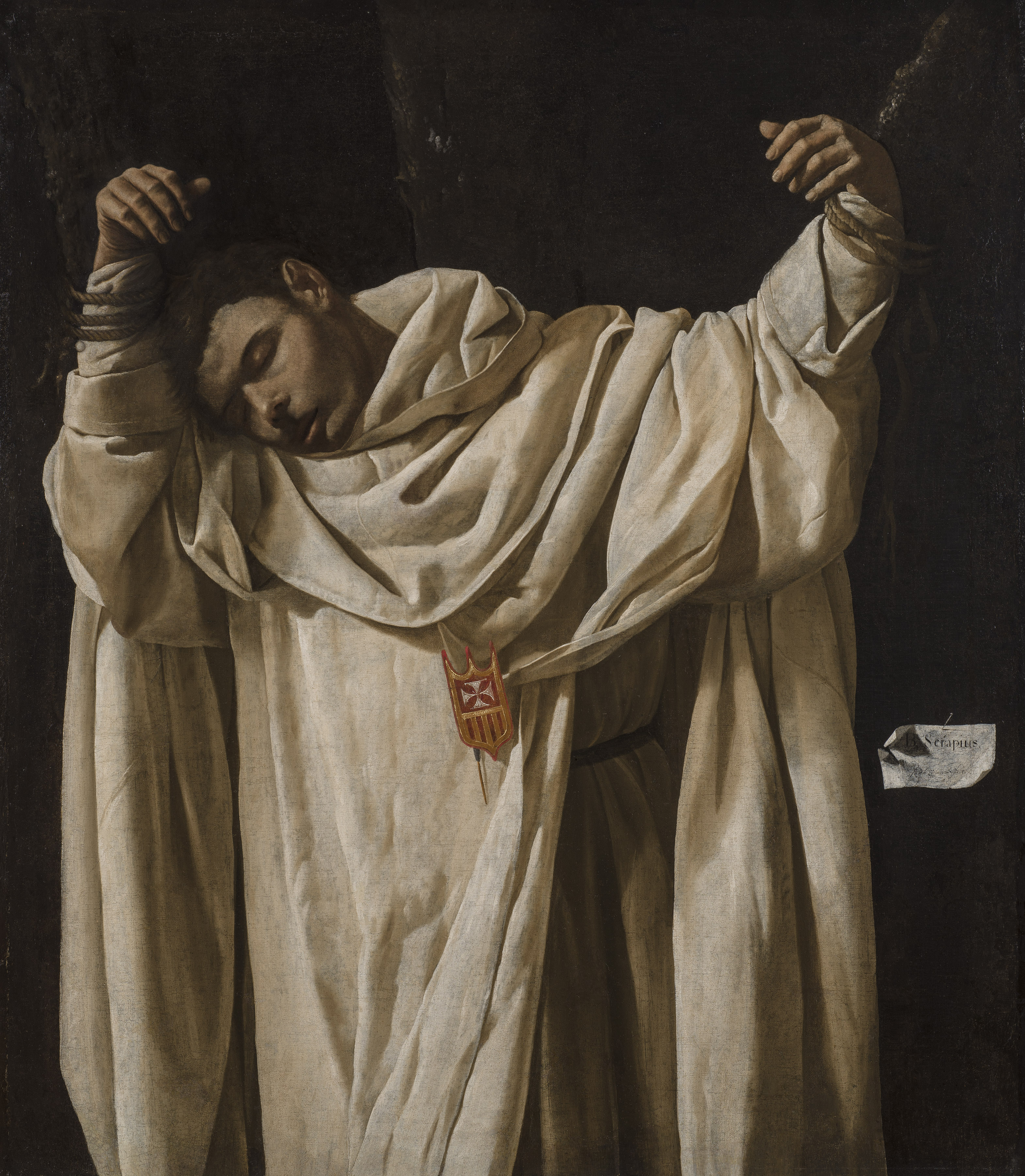
- The Martyrdom of Saint Serapion by Francisco de Zurbarán.

Martyr
- Born: 1179; England or Scotland
- Died: 14 November 1240; Algiers
- Venerated in: Catholic Church
- Beatified: 23 March 1625, Saint Peter's Basilica by Pope Urban VIII
- Canonized: 14 April 1728, Saint Peter's Basilica by Pope Benedict XIII
- Feast: 14 November
- Attributes: Mercedarian habit, crucified
- Patronage: Diocese of Azul

Serapion of Algiers (1179 – 14 November 1240) was an English Catholic Mercedarian priest and martyr. Thomas O'Loughlin says Serapion was Scottish by birth. Serapion is acknowledged as a proto-martyr. He was the first of his Order to merit the palm of martyrdom by being crucified and cut to pieces.

== Life ==
Mercedarian tradition says that Serapion Scott once served in the armies of Richard the Lion-Heart and Leopold VI during the time of the Crusades. He accompanied his father during the Crusades in his childhood and was present at a battle at Acre in 1191. He participated in the Reconquista while serving in the armed forces for either Alfonso VIII of Castile or Alfonso IX of León. He met Peter Nolasco in Barcelona and became a professed member of the Mercedarians in 1222. The Mercedarians' goal was to free Christian captives held in Muslim states. He was assigned to recruit for the order in England but pirates besieged the ship and left him for dead. He survived and wandered to London to preach which landed him in trouble and he was ordered to leave the town.

== Death ==
There are various accounts of his death. By one account, he was beaten to death by French pirates at Marseilles.

He made two journeys for the ransom of captives, in 1240. The first was to Murcia, in which he purchased the liberty of ninety-eight slaves: the second to Algiers, in which he redeemed eighty-seven, but remained himself a hostage for the full payment of the money. A widely circulated early account holds that the ransom did not arrive in time and so his captors decided to have him killed. He was nailed on an X-shaped cross and was dismembered.

The most authoritative account comes from the early annals of the Mercedarians. "Captured in Scotland by English pirates, Serapion was bound by the hands and feet to two poles, and was then beaten, dismembered, and disemboweled. Finally, his neck was partly severed, leaving his head to dangle."

The Baroque artist Francisco Zurbarán depicts the Martyrdom of Saint Serapion in one of his paintings.

Pope Benedict XIII declared Serapion a martyr, and approved his veneration in the Order of Mercedarians, by a decree in 1728. Pope Benedict XIV added him to the Roman Martyrology. Serapion is commemorated on 14 November.

== See also ==
- List of Catholic saints
