= Saint Mark (Mantegna) =

Painting by Andrea Mantegna

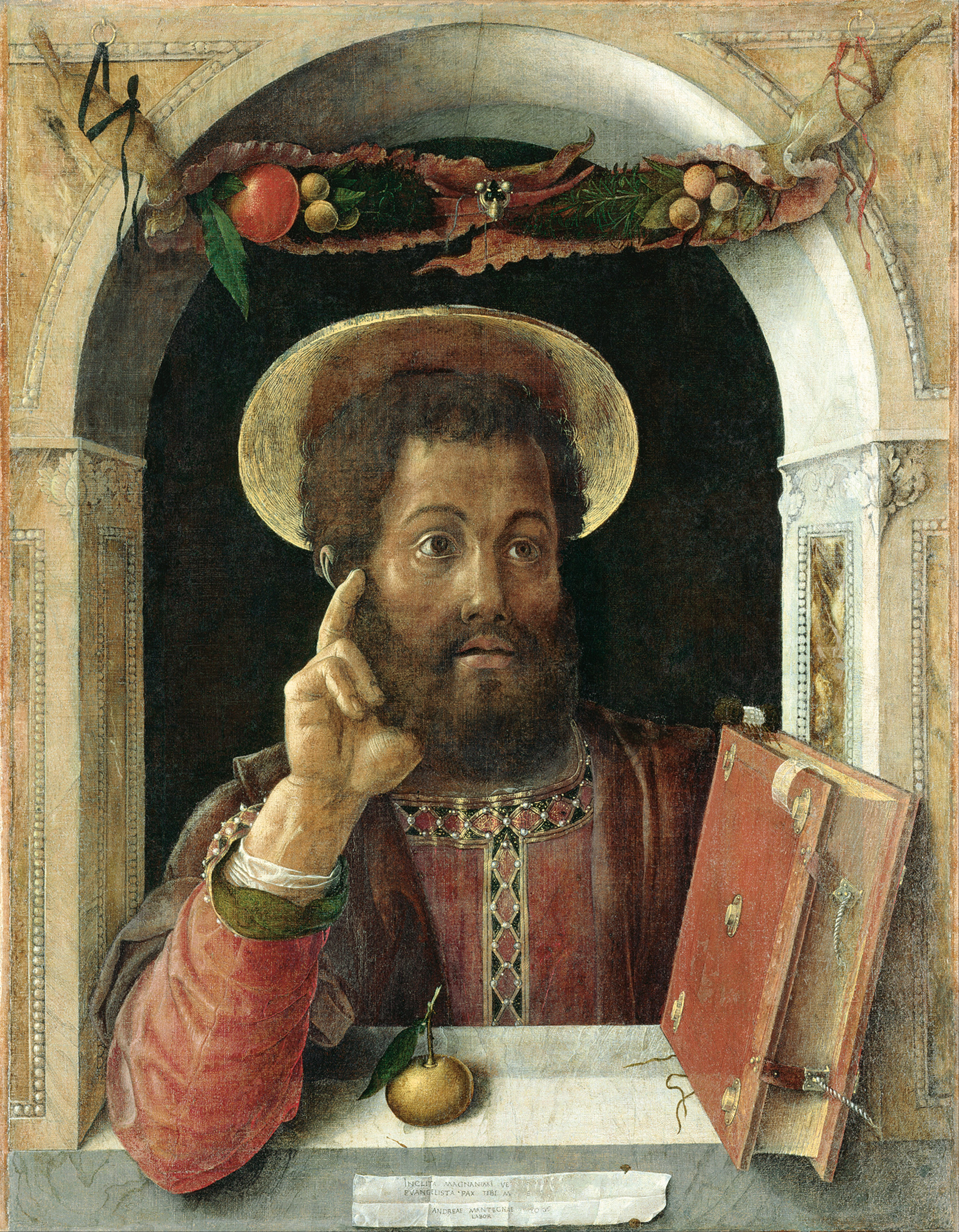
- Artist: Andrea Mantegna
- Year: 1448
- Medium: Tempera on canvas
- Dimensions: 82 cm × 63.5 cm (32 in × 25.0 in)
- Location: Städel Museum, Frankfurt

Saint Mark is a painting of 1448 in tempera on canvas by Andrea Mantegna in the Städel Museum, Frankfurt. A depiction of Mark the Evangelist, it is the earliest known work by the artist.

Mantegna was aged 17 in 1448, the year in which he regained his independence after six years in the studio of Francesco Squarcione. He filed a lawsuit against his former master for not paying him for works he had produced under his own name. He also began several commissions, such as the altarpiece for the church of Santa Sofia in Padua, now destroyed.

The work is signed and dated 1448 on a small cartouche in the foreground, inscribed INCLITA MAGNANIMI VEN... / EVANGELISTA PAX TIBI M[ARC]E / ANDREAE MANTEGNAE PICTORIS LABOR. The use of a cartouche in this way originated in Flemish art and was also used by other Italian artists such as Filippo Lippi.

== Bibliography ==
- Pauli, Tatjana; Mantegna, Andrea (2001). Mantegna (in Italian). Leonardo Arte. ISBN 978-88-8310-187-8.
