= Andrea Bellunello =

Italian painter

Andrea Bellunello, also known as Andrea di San Vito (1440 – 1506) was an Italian painter active in the early Renaissance period. He was born either in San Vito in the Friuli, or in Belluno. He was active in the Udine and surrounding region of Friuli. He worked with or under Francesco Squarcione and/or Bortolotto di Belluno. Among his pupils were Giorgio di Beccaio (active 1492–1506); Giorgio di Cecco (born Pordenone, 1465).

Andrea painted a Crucifixion for the Grand Council of Udine, and an altarpiece for the church of San Floreano in Forni di Sopra. He also painted a Madonna for the Annunciata in San Vito.
