= Giovanni Marcanova =

Italian physician and antiquarian

Giovanni Marcanova (1415-1467) was an Italian physician and antiquarian.

== Biography ==
He was born in Padua, where he practiced medicine. But he is best known for his collection of images, mostly fanciful if not whimsical, of ancient Roman structures (Collectio antiquitatum), and other treatises on Roman customs, including De dignitatibus Romanorum; De Triumpho; and De rebus militaribus. Some of the engraved images from Collectio are attributed to Marco Zoppo. Marcanova dedicated his collection to Domenico Malatesta, the lord of Cesena and patron of the Biblioteca Malatestiana. The drawings are meant to depict Roman monuments (Tomb of Hadrian, Arch of Titus, Vatican obelisk, Baths of Diocletian, Statue of Marcus Aurelius), Tiber River, Tarpean Rock, Monte Testaccio, Campidoglio, and a market day, a human sacrifice, and tournament.
