= Saint Serapion (Zurbarán) =

Painting by the Spanish artist Francisco Zurbarán

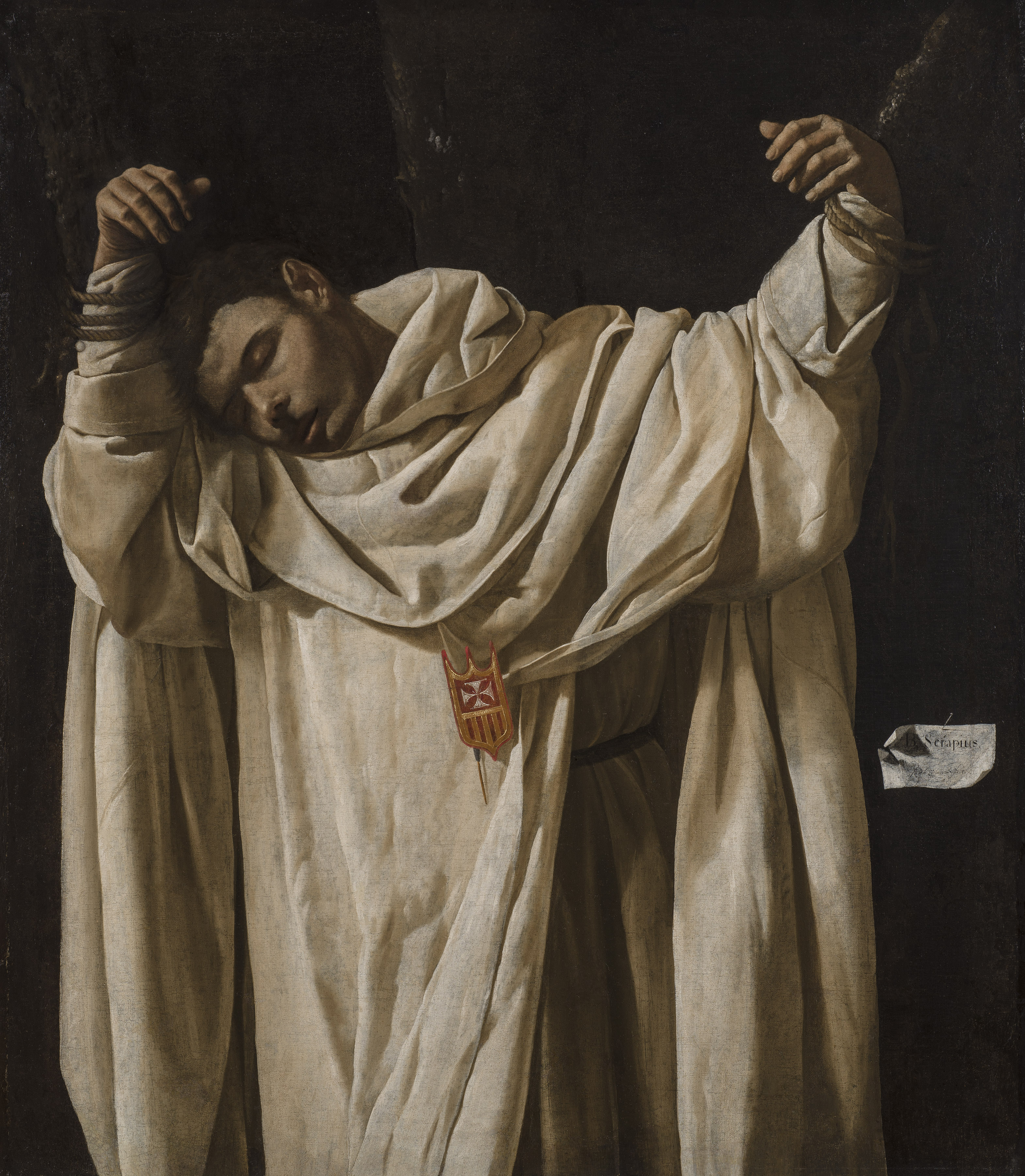
Francisco de Zurbarán, The Martyrdom of Saint Serapion 1628, 120 × 103 cm, Oil on canvas, Wadsworth Atheneum, Hartford, Connecticut

Saint Serapion or The Martyrdom of Saint Serapion is a 1628 oil painting on canvas by the Spanish artist Francisco Zurbarán (1598–1664). The work was commissioned by the Mercedarian Order to hang in the De Profundis (funerary chapel) hall of their monastery in Seville (now Museum of Fine Arts of Seville). Zurbarán is noted for his portrayals of penitent or martyred monks and saints. Critic Tom Lubbock used this painting to illustrate a difference in the way the martyrdom of two different saints are depicted. He contrasted the understated and calm depiction of St. Serapion's violent death with the equally or more violent death of the Jesuit priest and martyr Saint Edmund Campion (1540–1581) who was publicly hanged, drawn and quartered in London in December 1581. The art critic draws a comparison in the manner of the depiction of Campion's death and that of Saint Serapion of Algiers (1179–1240), a Mercedarian friar who fought in the Third Crusade of 1196 and was later martyred.

Saint Serapion is depicted by Zurbarán in a quasi-crucified pose, standing with each hand bound by ropes and chains to an overhead horizontal pole. According to Michael Brenson of The New York Times, his head "has shifted from the realm of the robe to the realm of the cape, which supports the head and seems to have the potential to lift it to the sky". The painting stops at the figure's knee level, while the strain placed on his arms is indicated by the heavy hanging folds of the drapes of the cloth hanging from left shoulder and right outstretched arm. The saint is identified by text on a small note placed to the left of his chest area.

The work makes strong use of chiaroscuro in the Spanish Tenebrist tradition of Jusepe de Ribera. The dominance of the white paint used to render the cloth creates a sense of tranquillity, while the tension of the painting is derived from the dark shade created by the deep folds of the robes. In 2003, Scottish painter Alison Watt wrote, "Each fold has been pared down to the basic elements of light and shade. As a viewer you are seduced by this simplicity, only to realise you have been duped. Zurbarán has elevated the humble fabric of the robes of Saint Serapion to a divine level with pure, magnificent white."

== Influence ==
There is an allusion to Zurburán's depiction of Saint Serapion in the poem "Meditations in an Emergency" by the mid-twentieth century American poet Frank O'Hara:

St. Serapion, I wrap myself in the robes of your whiteness which is like midnight in Dostoevsky.

== Bibliography ==
- Gállego, Julián; Gudiol, José. Zurbarán. London: Alpine Fine Arts Collection, 1987. ISBN 0-88168-115-6
- Kleiner, Mamiya. In Kleiner, Fred: Gardner's Art Through the Ages: A Global History: v. 2. Cengage Learning, 2008. ISBN 0-495-41060-8
