= Still-Life with Partridge and Gauntlets =

1504 painting by Jacopo de' Barbari

Dead Partridge with Iron Gauntlets and Crossbow Arrows
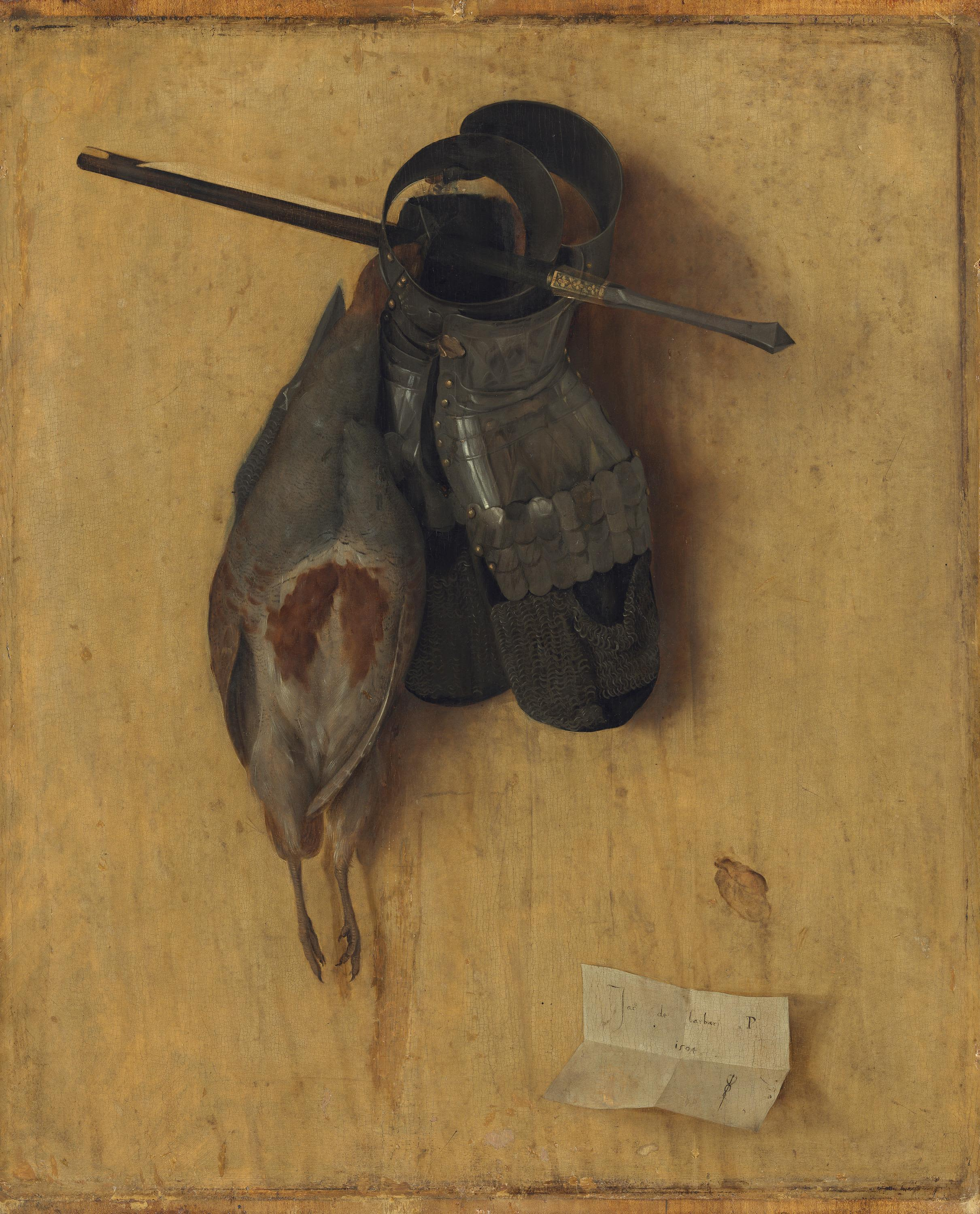
- Artist: Jacopo de' Barbari
- Year: 1504
- Medium: Oil on panel
- Dimensions: 52 cm × 42.5 cm (20 in × 16.7 in)
- Location: Alte Pinakothek, Munich

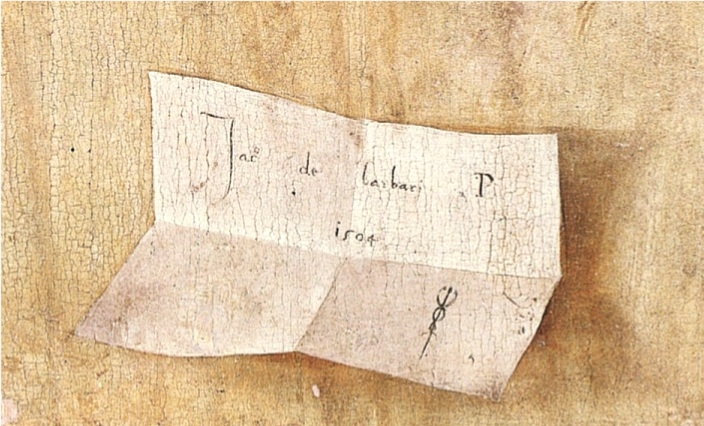
Signature of Jacopo de' Barbari, date 1504, and caduceus

Still-Life with Partridge and Gauntlets also called Dead Partridge with Iron Gauntlets and Crossbow Arrows is a 1504 painting by the Italian painter Jacopo de' Barbari. It measures 52 cm × 42.5 cm (20.5 in × 16.7 in) and is held by the Alte Pinakothek in Munich. The small oil-on-limewood-panel painting is considered to be one of the earliest examples of a still life painting, and one of the first trompe-l'œil paintings, to be made in Europe since classical antiquity.

The painting depicts a dead grey partridge, with two iron gauntlets, and a crossbow bolt passing through them. The set of objects appears as if it is lying on top of a wooden table or hanging from a nail against a wooden wall. To the lower right is a scrap of paper with the date and the painter's signature, and a drawing of caduceus, a symbol used by Jacopo de' Barbari. It is painted on a panel of linden wood, with the background painted to imitate wood grain. The panel may have been made as the back or the hinged cover for a portrait, or as an amusing decoration for a hunting room. It is held by the Alte Pinakothek, and has been in the Bavarian State Painting Collections since 1804, before which it was held at the Schloss Neuburg since at least 1764.

The British Museum holds a similar drawing of a dead grey partridge by Jacopo de' Barbari, also dated to 1504, from the collection of Sir Hans Sloane.

== See also ==
- Two Venetian Ladies, a 1490 painting by Vittore Carpaccio with a trompe-l'œil letter rack painted on the back: another candidate for the first trompe-l'œil painting since antiquity
