= Madonna and Child (Squarcione) =

Painting by Francesco Squarcione

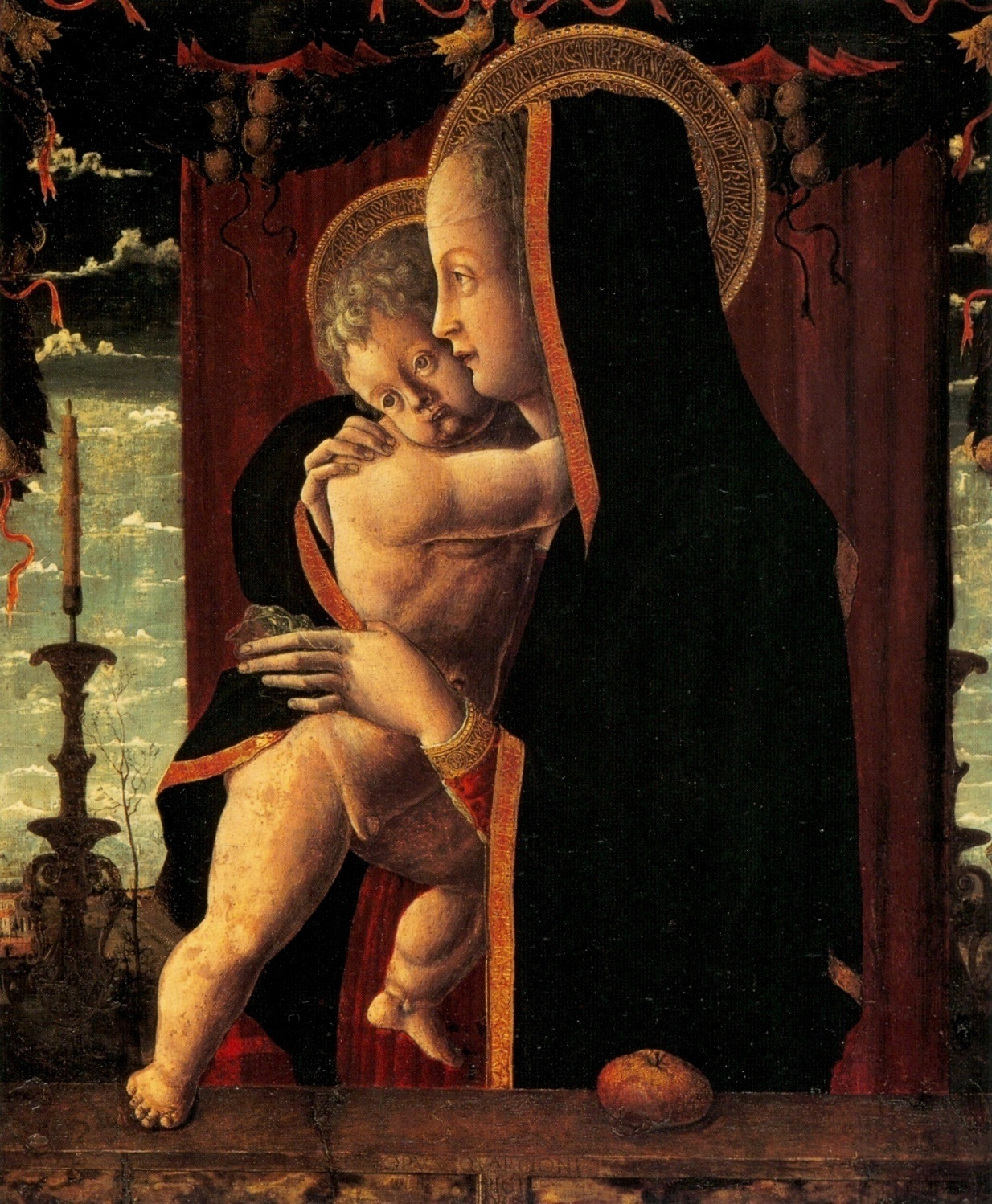

Madonna and Child is a 1455 tempera on poplar panel painting by Francesco Squarcione, one of only two definitively confirmed works by the artist, who signed and dated it. The work is now in the Gemäldegalerie in Berlin.

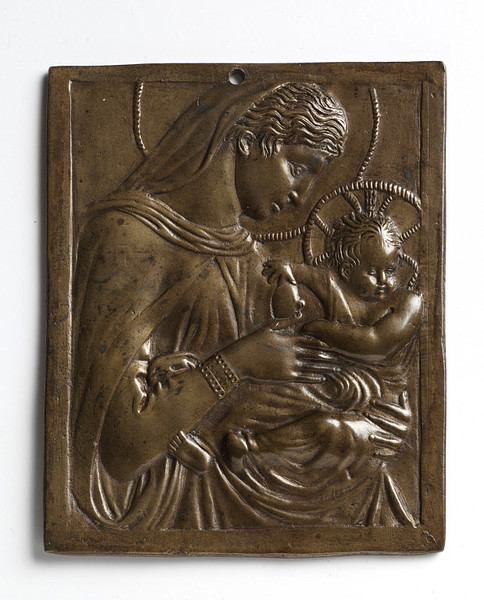
The plaquette by Donatello

The emphasis on perspective and clear line derive from Donatello, who lived in Padua from 1443 to 1453—Squarcione was his main imitator in the Veneto and the painting's composition draws on that of a plaquette by that sculptor.
