= Francesco Squarcione =

Italian painter

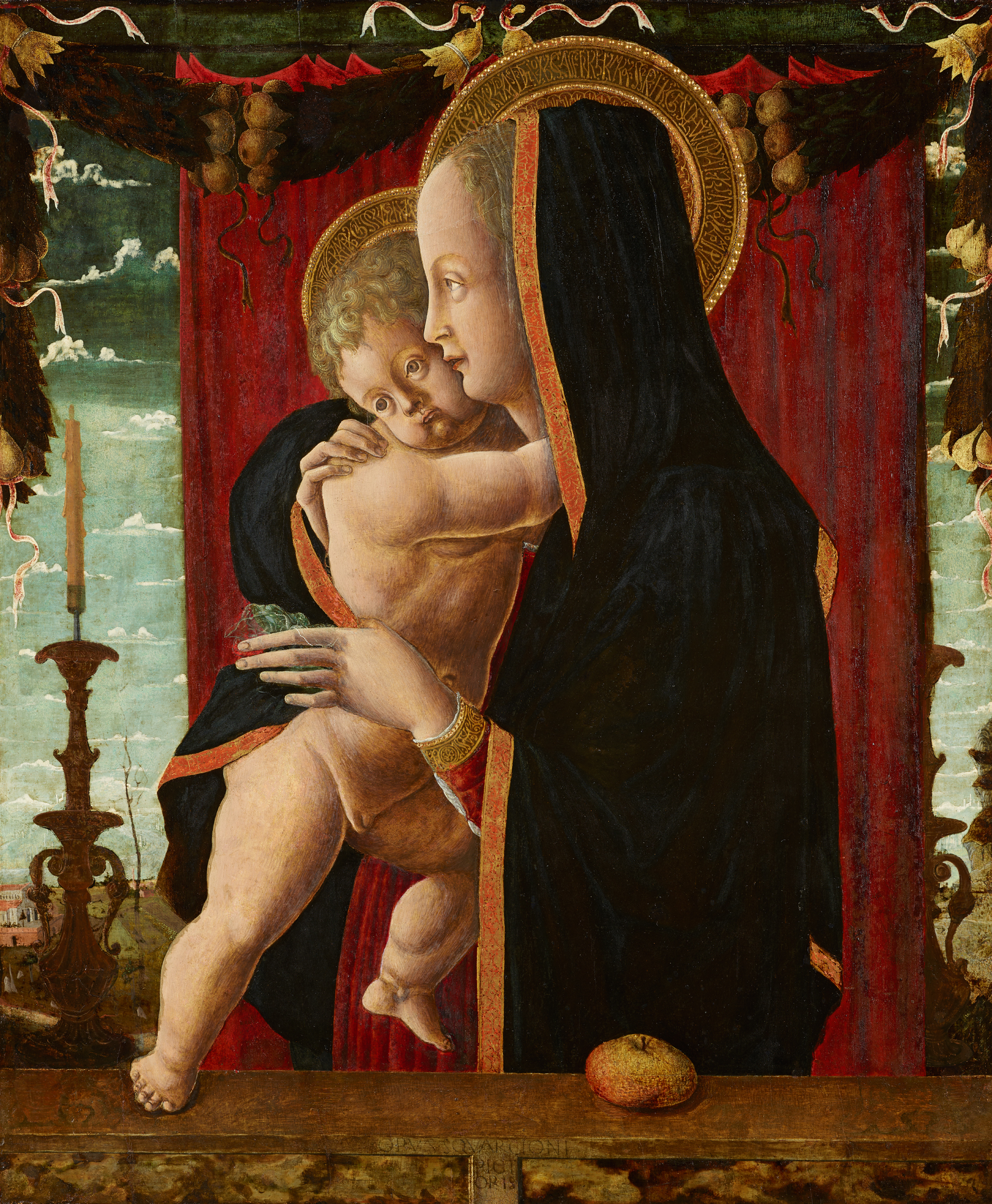
- Virgin and Child (c. 1460), poplar wood, 82 x 70 cm, Staatliche Museen, Berlin
- Born: c. 1395; Padua, Republic of Venice (now Italy)
- Died: May 1468 (aged 72–73); Padua, Republic of Venice (now Italy)
- Known for: Painting, fresco
- Notable work: Madonna and Child (1455); Lazara Altarpiece (c. 1450)
- Movement: Italian Renaissance

Francesco Squarcione (c. 1395 – after May 1468) was an Italian artist from Padua. Squarcione is considered by some to be the head of the first independent school for painters. His pupils included Andrea Mantegna (with whom he had many legal battles), Cosimo Tura and Carlo Crivelli. There are only two works signed by him: the Madonna and Child (now in Berlin) and the Lazara Altarpiece (now in Padua).

== Biography ==
Squarcione, whose original vocation was tailoring, is first referred to as a painter in 1426, when he executed an altarpiece for the Olivetan monastery at Venda, south of Padua. He was then living near the Santo in Padua, where he later established his school. Soon after completing this altarpiece, Squarcione left Padua. Squarcione appears to have had a remarkable enthusiasm for ancient art and the civilization of classical antiquity. According to Scardeone, who knew Squarcione’s lost autobiography, he travelled throughout Italy and Greece (i.e. the Byzantine Empire), collecting antique statues, reliefs, vases, and other works of art, forming a collection of such works, making drawings from them himself, and throwing open his stores for others to study from.

After returning to Padua, Squarcione opened his school for painters and took on his first pupil, Michele di Bartolommeo, in 1431. As many as 137 painters and pictorial students passed through his school, established, which became famous all over Italy. Pupils or followers of Squarcione include Francesco Verla, Pietro Calzetta, and Andrea Bellunello. His favorite pupil was Andrea Mantegna. Squarcione taught Mantegna the Latin language and instructed him to study fragments of Roman sculpture.

Apart from a Crucifixion, completed in 1439 for a Venetian patron, he undertook few commissions at this time. His purchase in 1440 of a neighbouring house to form a second place of study was therefore probably a result of recent success in teaching rather than in painting. In 1441 Squarcione’s name first appears in connection with the Paduan painters' guild. Throughout the 1440s he was concerned with minor artistic works in Paduan churches and was sufficiently important to be received by the Holy Roman Emperor Frederick III in 1452.

From the 1440s Squarcione occasionally lived in Venice, where he executed two paintings, which are recorded in an inventory dated 1466 of the Scuola di San Marco. In 1463 he made designs for intarsia panels for the Santo, Padua, and two years later constructed a model of Padua for the city authorities. He made his final will in May 1468.

== Work ==
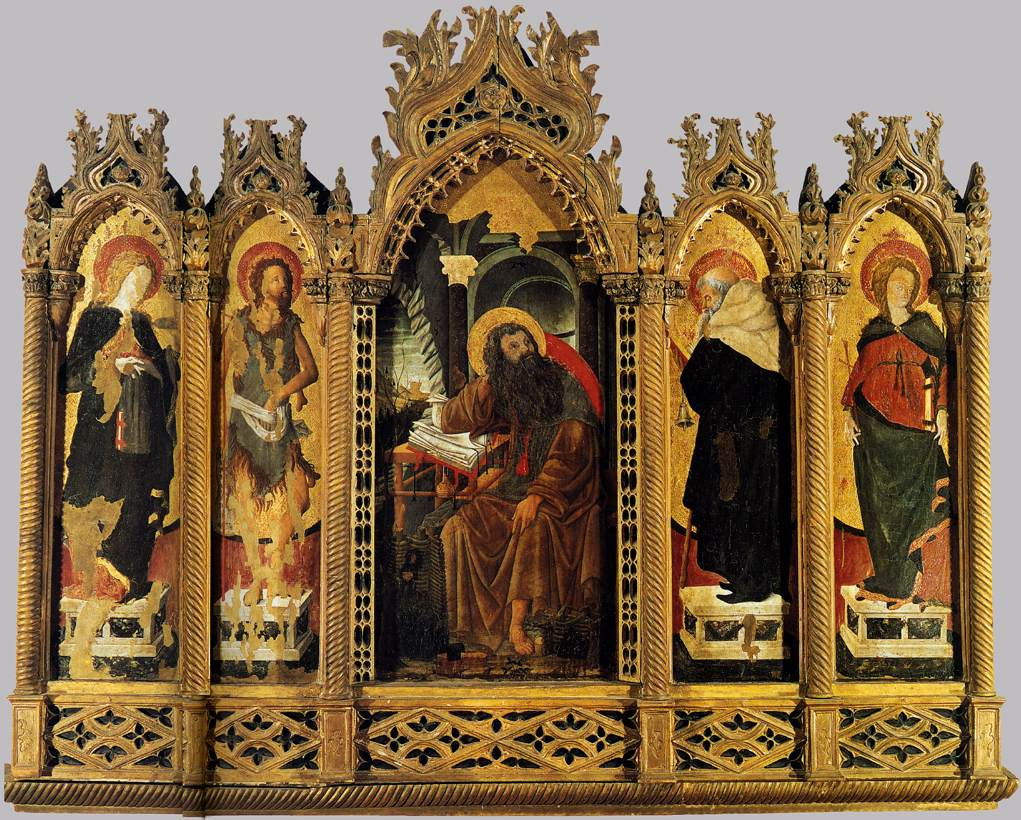
Lazara Altarpiece, Padua, Musei Civici

Two paintings survive that are clearly connected with Squarcione. One is an altarpiece (Padua, Musei Civici), formerly in the Carmine in Padua, commissioned by Leone de Lazzara in 1449 and completed in 1452. The central panel shows St. Jerome seated in his study with a landscape behind. Four side panels each contain a saint standing on a pedestal. The figures are imaginatively posed and sensitively characterized, though the draughtsmanship is weak. The elegant drapery style suggests that the artist had studied the work of Pisanello.

The second work, a signed but undated Virgin and Child (Gemäldegalerie, Berlin), is stylistically rather different. This features a number of spatial devices, such as the foreground ledge and classicizing swags, indications that the artist was influenced by Tuscan artists interested in pictorial space, such as Donatello. The influence of Fra Filippo Lippi, active in Padua during the 1430s, is evident in the Virgin’s delicate profile and the Child’s pose.

The contrast between the Renaissance motifs in the Berlin Virgin and Child and the Gothic features of the Lazzara altarpiece has led to the suggestion that the two works may not be by the same painter. However, comparison of such details as the hair and sky confirms that the same artist painted both.

Frescoes of the Life of St. Francis on the façade of San Francesco, Padua (only sinopie survive) were ascribed to Squarcione by Scardeone. A painting by Squarcione listed in a Florentine inventory suggests his reputation extended beyond the Veneto. As Squarcione adopted several pupils, apparently compelling them to undertake commissions in his name, the possibility remains that none of these works was executed by Squarcione himself. Evidence indicates that he chose his most talented pupils for adoption in order to take advantage of their skills for financial gain. Mantegna, who was adopted c. 1441, implies in a document of 1448 that he deserted Squarcione because of unreasonable exploitation. Another case of exploitation applies to Marco Zoppo, whose contract of adoption was made in 1455 and annulled later the same year. Zoppo left, notwithstanding the prospect of inheriting Squarcione’s considerable estate.

Further documents reveal some of Squarcione’s teaching methods. The contract of 1431 with Michele di Bartolommeo and subsequent contracts such as that of 1467 state that the pupil was allowed to study Squarcione’s exempla, drawings that acted as models. His collection included a drawing by (?Antonio) Pollaiuolo that showed some nude figures probably related to Squarcione’s ‘system for the naked body’ mentioned in the contract of 1467. It was allegedly stolen by a former pupil, Giorgio Schiavone, but recovered by Squarcione’s son in 1474.

Squarcione also possessed a collection of antiquities that were employed as models. Documents of 1455 refer to reliefs kept in his workshop and to plaster used ‘for shaping figures’. Vasari explained this by referring to Squarcione’s collection of casts made from antique statues. Another feature of Squarcione’s teaching was a method used for foreshortening figures and constructing perspectival views. But doubt exists about the extent of his knowledge of linear perspective: in 1465 a pupil maintained that although Squarcione promised to show him the true method of perspective, he was actually incapable of teaching it.

== Legacy ==
By the 16th century Squarcione’s reputation as a teacher who had helped to shape the character of North Italian painting was firmly established. According to Scardeone, Squarcione was considered the best teacher of his time and was called ‘the father of painters’, having had 137 pupils. As a Paduan, Scardeone probably exaggerated Squarcione’s significance. The works connected with him do not suggest that Squarcione offered his pupils anything original. Indeed the work of Dario di Giovanni, one of Squarcione’s pupils during the early 1440s, is very old-fashioned and provides no hint of the painterly devices that Squarcione later claimed to teach. It seems likely, therefore, that Squarcione’s reputation rested principally on the achievements of his most talented pupils whose ideas he exploited. This explains why pupils turned against him and why documents indicate that he was deceitful in financial matters. Nonetheless his school brought together many notable painters and facilitated the exchange of artistic ideas.

== Bibliography ==
- Vasari, Giorgio (1878). G. Milanesi (ed.). Le vite de' più eccellenti pittori, scultori ed architettori. Vol. 3. Florence: Sansoni. p. 85.
- Scardeone, Bernardino (1560). Historiae de urbis patavinae antiquitate et claris civibus patavinis. Basel: Nicolaus Episcopius. pp. 370–71.
- Tolley, Thomas (2003). "Squarcione, Francesco". Grove Art Online. Oxford University Press. doi:10.1093/gao/9781884446054.article.T080696.
