= Francesco Verla =

Italian painter

Francesco Verla (1470- circa 1521) was an Italian painter of the Renaissance period, active in Northern Italy.

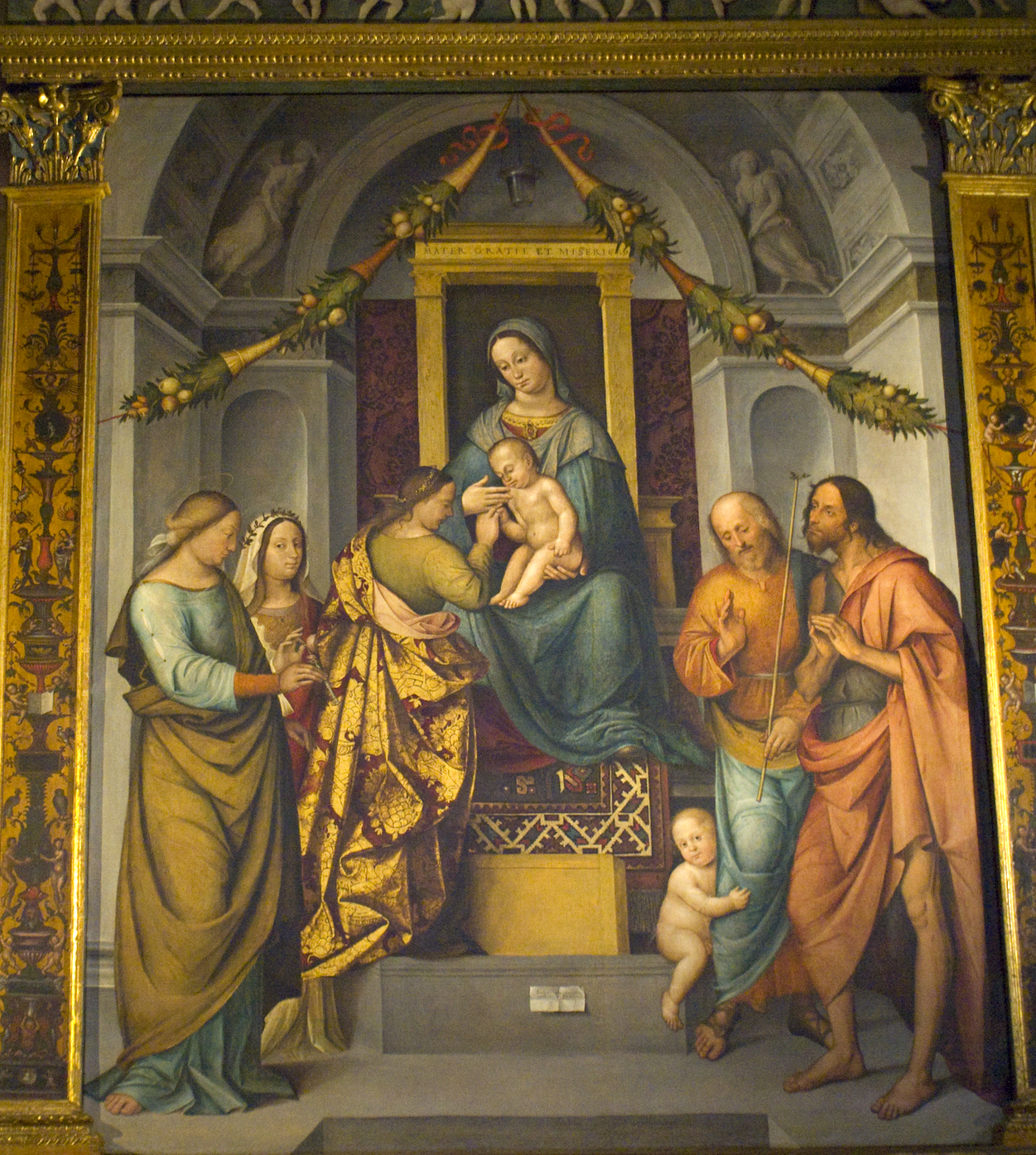
Mystical Marriage of St Catherine of Alexandria (1512), San Francesco, Schio.

== Biography ==
He was born in Villaverla and died in Rovereto. He was a follower of Bartolomeo Montagna, and influenced by Mantegna and Perugino. He is described by some, however, as emerging from the School of Vicenza. An Enthroned Madonna and Child with Saints Joseph and Francis (1520) at the Pinacoteca di Brera, Milan, is attributed to Verla. A drawing depicting the Baptism of Christ at the Morgan Library and Museum in New York is attributed to Verla.

== Bibliography ==
- Mauro Lucco (a cura di), Mantegna a Mantova 1460-1506, catalogo della mostra, Skira Milano, 2006.
- Francesco Verla, pittore (Villaverla, 1470 cr. - Rovereto, 1521). by Lionello Puppi, CAT, 1967.
