= Dario di Giovanni =

Italian painter

Dario di Giovanni (1420 – 1495), was an Italian painter of the Renaissance period.

== Biography ==
Di Giovanni was born in Pordenone and is known for religious works. By 1440 he was registered in Padua as pictor vagabundus, meaning journeyman painter, indicating that he was not associated with any workshop in particular. This fits with Di Giovanni's oeuvre, which was primarily frescoes in churches.

Di Giovanni died in Conegliano.

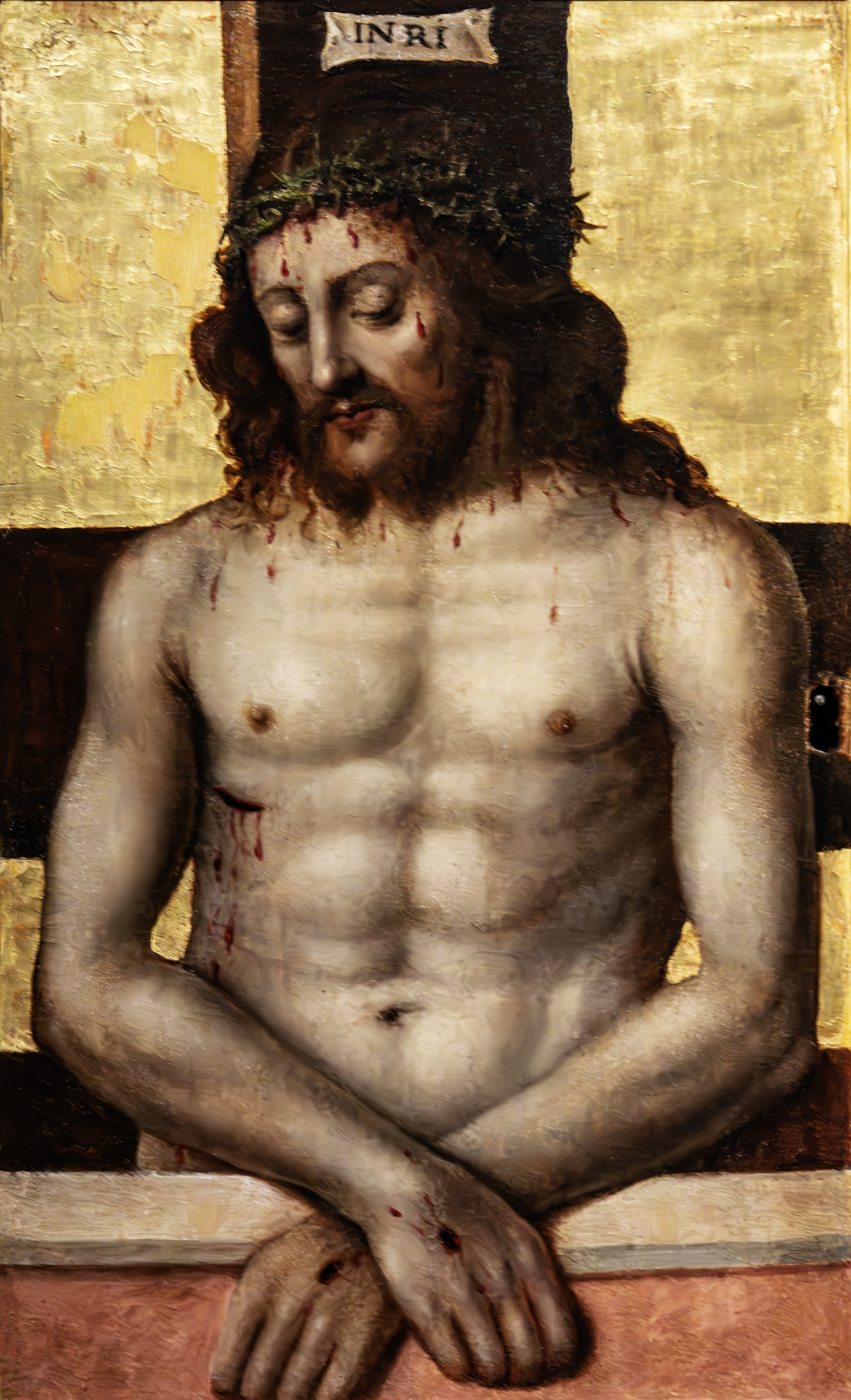
Imago Pietatis - Mid XV Century (Treviso)

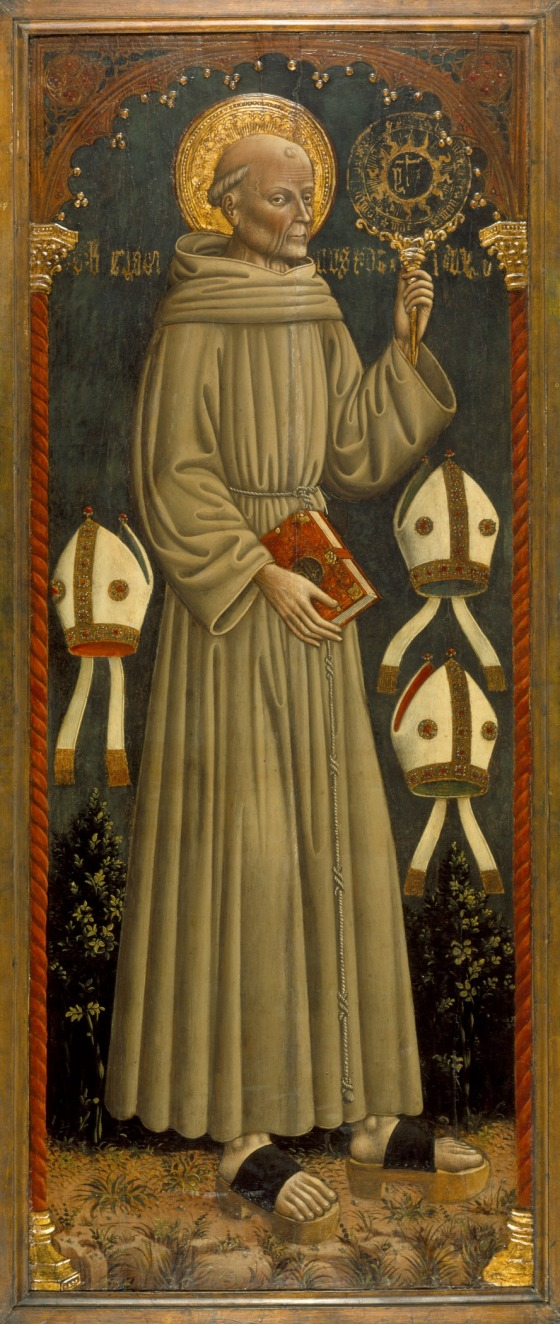
San Bernardino da Siena

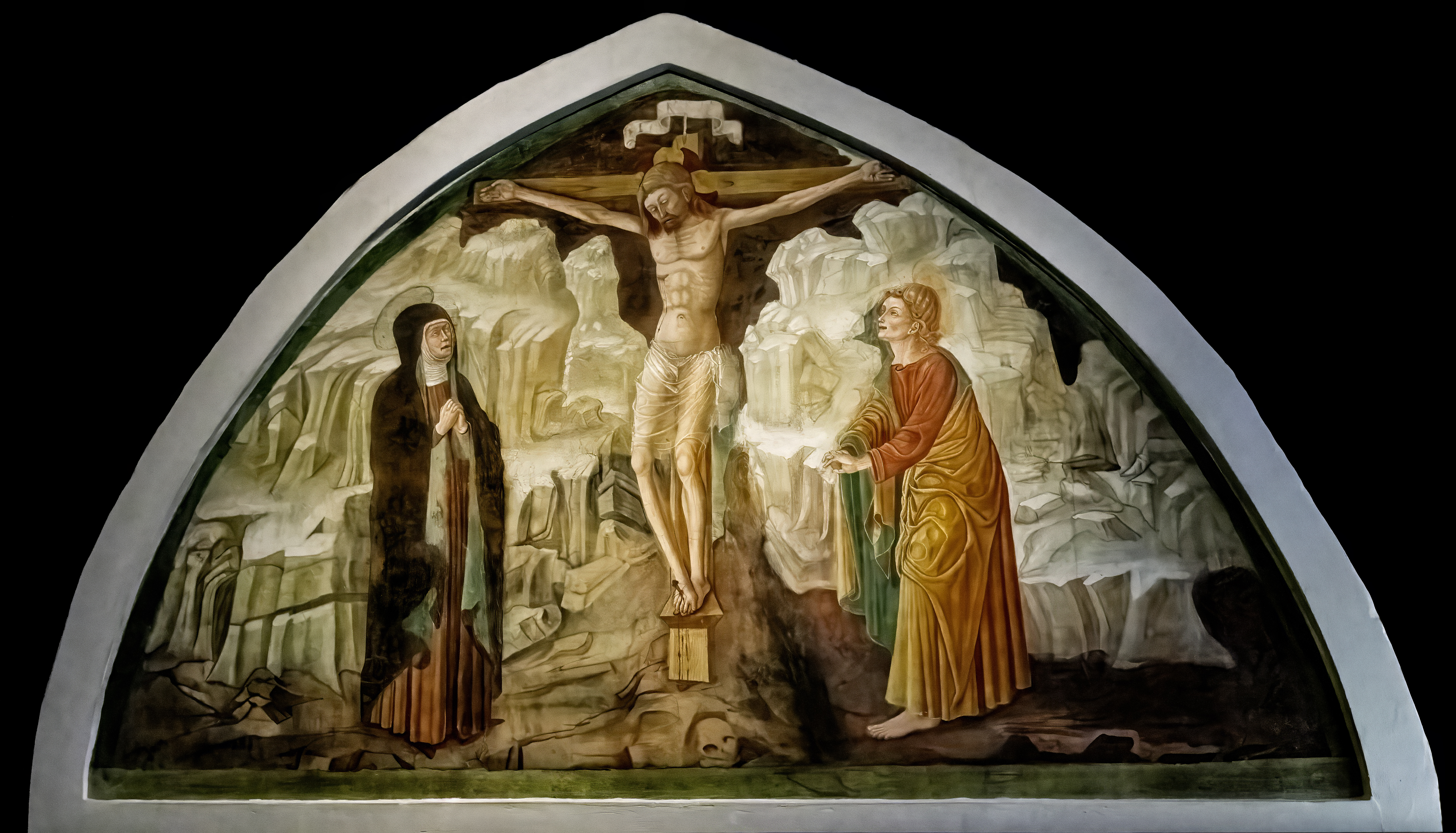
Crucifixion with the Madonna and St. John (Treviso)
