= Giovanni Battista Clarici =

Italian cartographer (1542–1602)

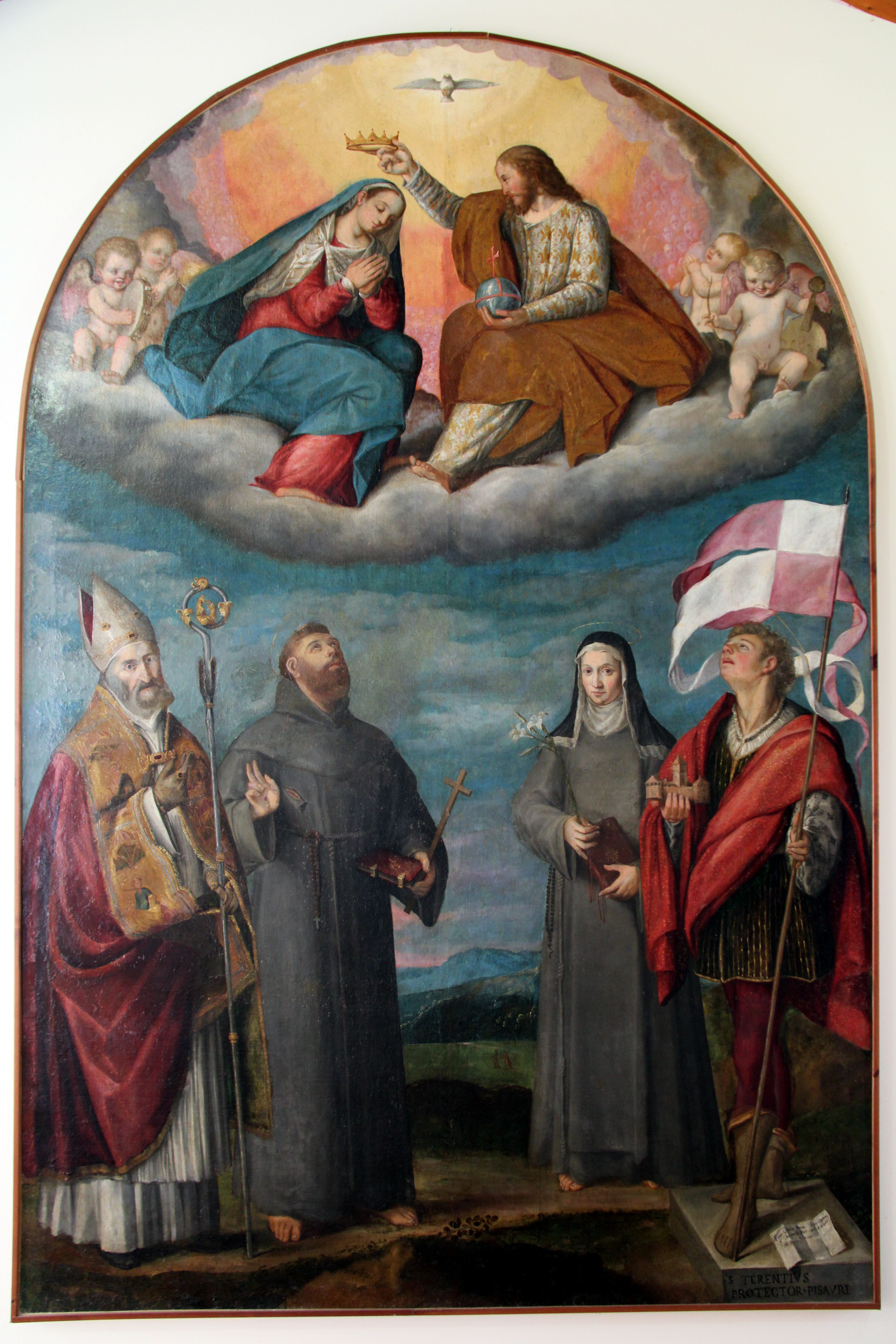
Incoronazione della Vergine, 1574

Giovanni Battista Clarici (1542 - 1602) was an Italian cartographer, painter and architect affiliated with the court at Milan.

He was born in Urbino, but in 1570, he moved to Milan for the remainder of his life. In Milan he worked as a painter of perspective, including architectural views, and served as architect and engineer for the Duke of Milan. In 1586, he succeeded Pellegrino Tibaldi as court engineer, active in both transient celebratory constructions and military planning. He is known for creating a map of the surroundings of Milan in 1583, which was corrected over the following decades.
