= Jacopo de' Barbari =

Italian painter and engraver (1460–1516)

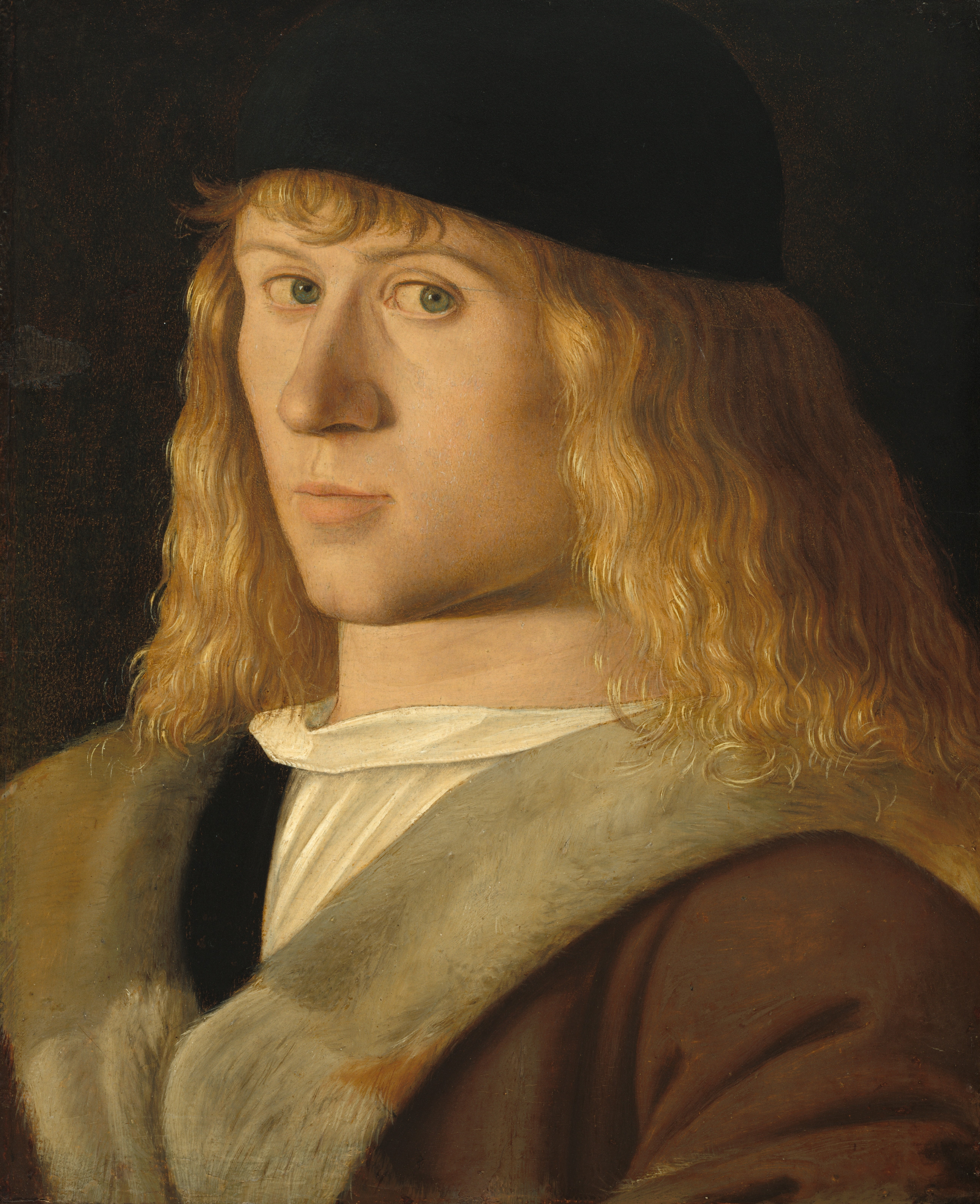
- Year: 1505
- Location: National Gallery of Art, Washington, D.C.

Jacopo de' Barbari, sometimes known or referred to as de'Barbari, de Barberi, de Barbari, Barbaro, Barberino, Barbarigo or Barberigo (c. 1460/70 – before 1516), was an Italian painter, printmaker and miniaturist with a highly individual style. He moved from Venice to Germany in 1500, thus becoming the first Italian Renaissance artist of stature to work in Northern Europe. His few surviving paintings (about twelve) include the first known example of trompe-l'œil since antiquity. His twenty-nine engravings and three very large woodcuts were also highly influential.

== Life ==
His place and date of birth are unknown, but he was described as a Venetian by contemporaries, including Albrecht Dürer ("van Venedig geporn"), and as 'old and weak' in 1511, so dates of between 1450 and 1470 have been proposed. Some believed that he was actually German-born before moving to Italy. However, this belief is not conclusive and remains a hypothesis to researchers. Since the earlier date range would have him achieve sudden prominence at the age of nearly fifty, the later date range would seem more likely. He signed most of his engravings with a caduceus, the sign of Mercury, and the Munich Still-Life with Partridge and Gauntlets (right) with this below his name: "Jac.o de barbarj p 1504" on the painted piece of paper. He was probably not of the important Venetian Barbaro family as he was never listed in that family's genealogy.

Nothing is known about his first decades, although Alvise Vivarini has been suggested as his master. He left Venice for Germany in 1500, and thereafter is better documented. There he worked for the Emperor Maximilian I in Nuremberg for a year, then in various places for Frederick the Wise of Saxony in 1503–1505, before moving to the court of the Elector Joachim I of Brandenburg for about the years 1506–1508. In Germany, he was often known as "Jacop Walch", probably from "Wälsch" meaning foreigner, a term especially used for Italians.

He may have returned to Venice with Philip the Handsome of Burgundy, for whom he later worked in the Netherlands. By March 1510 he was working for Philip's successor Archduchess Margaret in Brussels and Mechelen. In January 1511 he fell ill and made a will, and in March, the Archduchess gave him a pension for life, on account of his age and weakness ("debilitation et vieillesse"). By 1516, he had died, leaving the Archduchess in possession of twenty-three engraving plates, which, since many of his plates were probably engraved on both sides, means some engravings may not have survived.

== Work ==
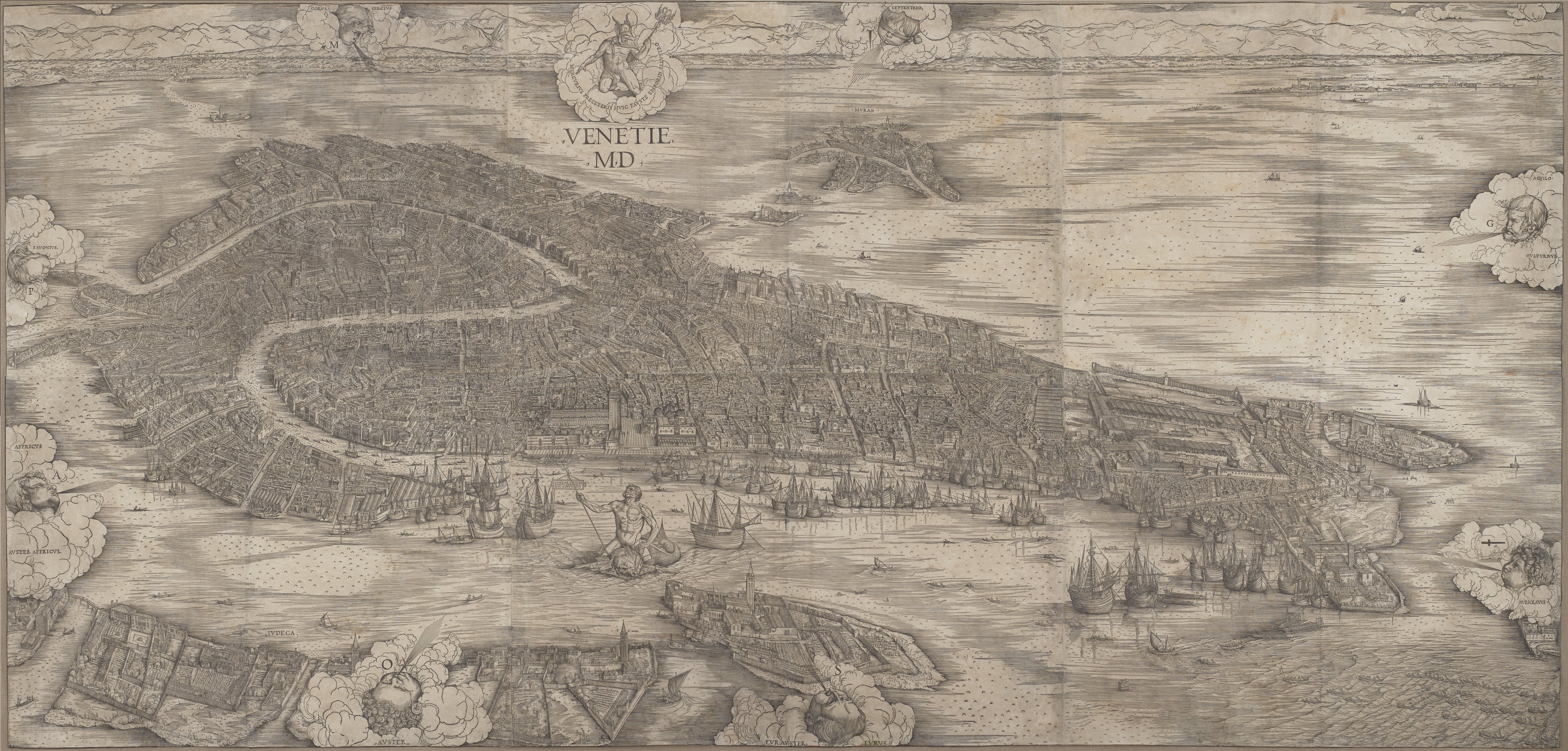
His very large woodcut View of Venice, 1500. First state at the Minneapolis Institute of Art

=== Map of Venice and other woodcuts ===
His earliest documented work is his huge (1.345 x 2.818 metres, from six blocks) and impressive woodcut aerial view Map of Venice, for which a privilege was granted to its publisher in 1500, recording that the work had taken three years. This clearly drew on the work of many surveyors, but was a spectacular feat nonetheless, and caused a considerable stir from the first. It was later updated by others to reflect major new building projects in a second state of the print.

Apart from the Map of Venice, he produced two other woodcuts, both of men and satyrs, which were the largest and most impressive figurative woodcuts yet produced, and which established the Italian tradition of fine, large, woodcuts for the following decades. These may have also been produced before 1500; they are clearly strongly influenced by Mantegna.

The Triumph of Men Over Satyrs, completed in the early 16th century, was de' Barbari's other notable multi-block print highlighting various themes related to mythology. This three-block print represents the scenes just after a battle—nude men and women walk towards a temple, showing the defeated satyrs bound as prisoners and carried in baskets. Multiple scholars, such as Juergen Schulz and David Landau, have suggested the connection with another woodcut titled Battle Between Satyrs and Men, wherein one of the placards in the later piece directly represents the battle scene from de' Barbari's earlier battle. Connections between the architecture of Venice in the background of the print relates to other paintings at the time such as the Process in St. Mark's Square, completed by Gentile Bellini in 1496.

=== Contacts with Dürer ===
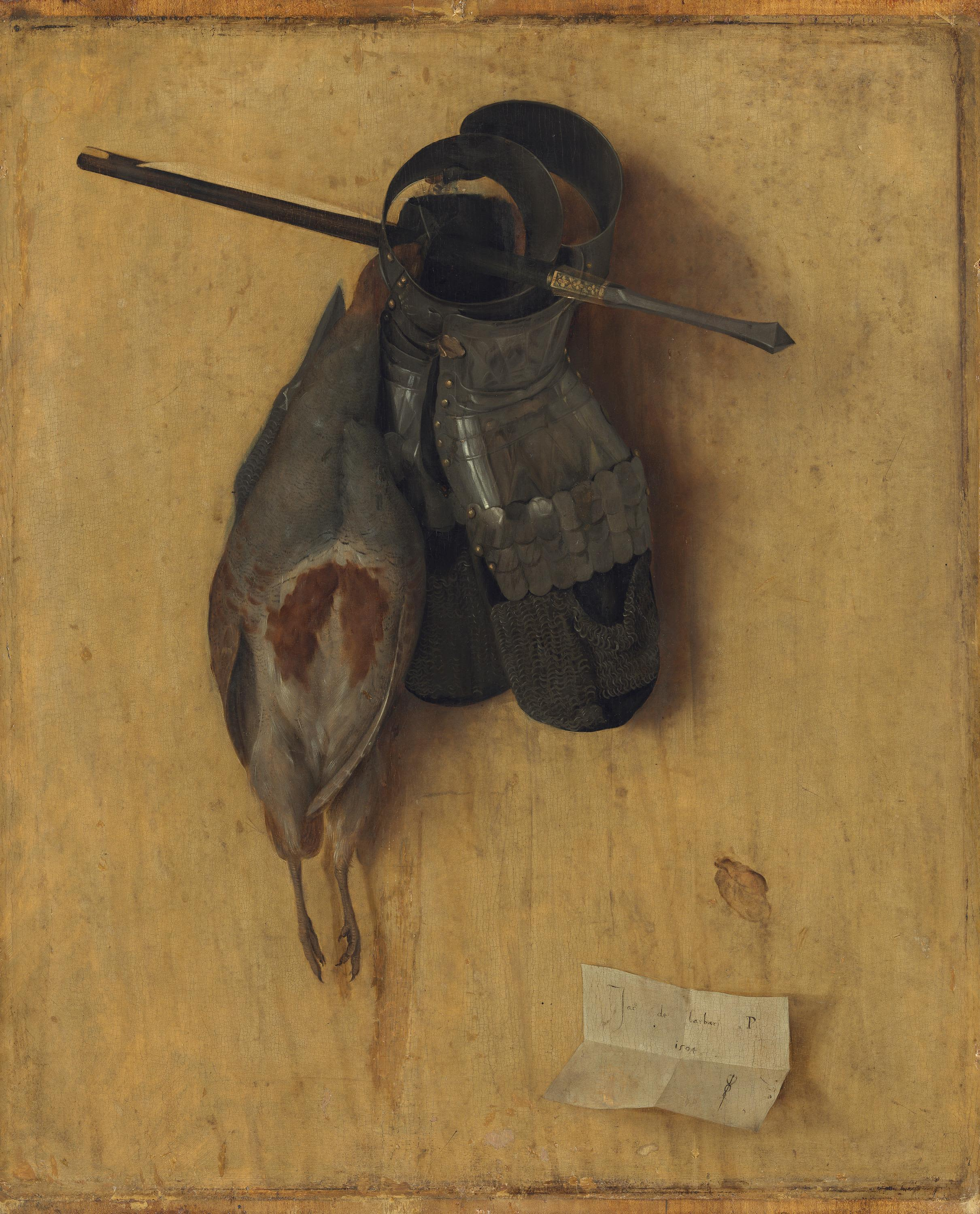
Still-Life with Partridge and Gauntlets, 1504, arguably the first still life

By the time the Map of Venice was published, de' Barbari had already left for Germany, where he met Dürer, whom he may have already known from Dürer's first Italian trip (a passage in a letter of Dürer's is ambiguous). They discussed human proportion, not obviously one of de' Barbari's strengths, but Dürer was evidently fascinated by what he had to say, though he recorded that de' Barberi had not told him everything he knew:

...I find no one who has written anything about how to make canon of human proportions except for a man named Jacob, born in Venice and a charming painter. He showed me a man and a woman which he had made according to measure, so that I would now rather see what he meant than behold a new kingdom... Jacobus did not want to show his principles to me clearly, that I saw well. (From an unpublished draft of the Introduction to Dürer's own book on human proportions)

Twenty years later, Dürer tried unsuccessfully to get the Archduchess Margaret, Habsburg Regent of the Netherlands, to give him a manuscript book she had on the subject by de' Barbari, by then dead; the book has not survived.

=== Dating of artwork ===
De' Barberi spent a year in Nuremberg, where Dürer lived, in 1500–01, and influences flowed in both directions between him and Dürer for a number of years. None of his engravings are dated, so much of the dating of them depends on resemblances to dated prints by Dürer; this is complicated by uncertainty in some cases as to who was influencing whom. Five of his engravings were in an album of Hartmann Schedel's, which was bound up in December 1504, which gives further evidence as to the dating. De' Barberi had probably made some engravings before leaving Italy, but his best engravings (and perhaps all of them) were probably done after his move to Germany in 1500.

Some of his paintings are dated as: 1500, 1503, 1504, 1508. Documents relating to his employment by Maximilian suggest his work was to include illuminating manuscripts, but no work in this medium has been generally attributed to him. His only generally accepted drawing is a Cleopatra in the British Museum, apparently done as a study for an engraving which has not survived.

=== Engravings ===
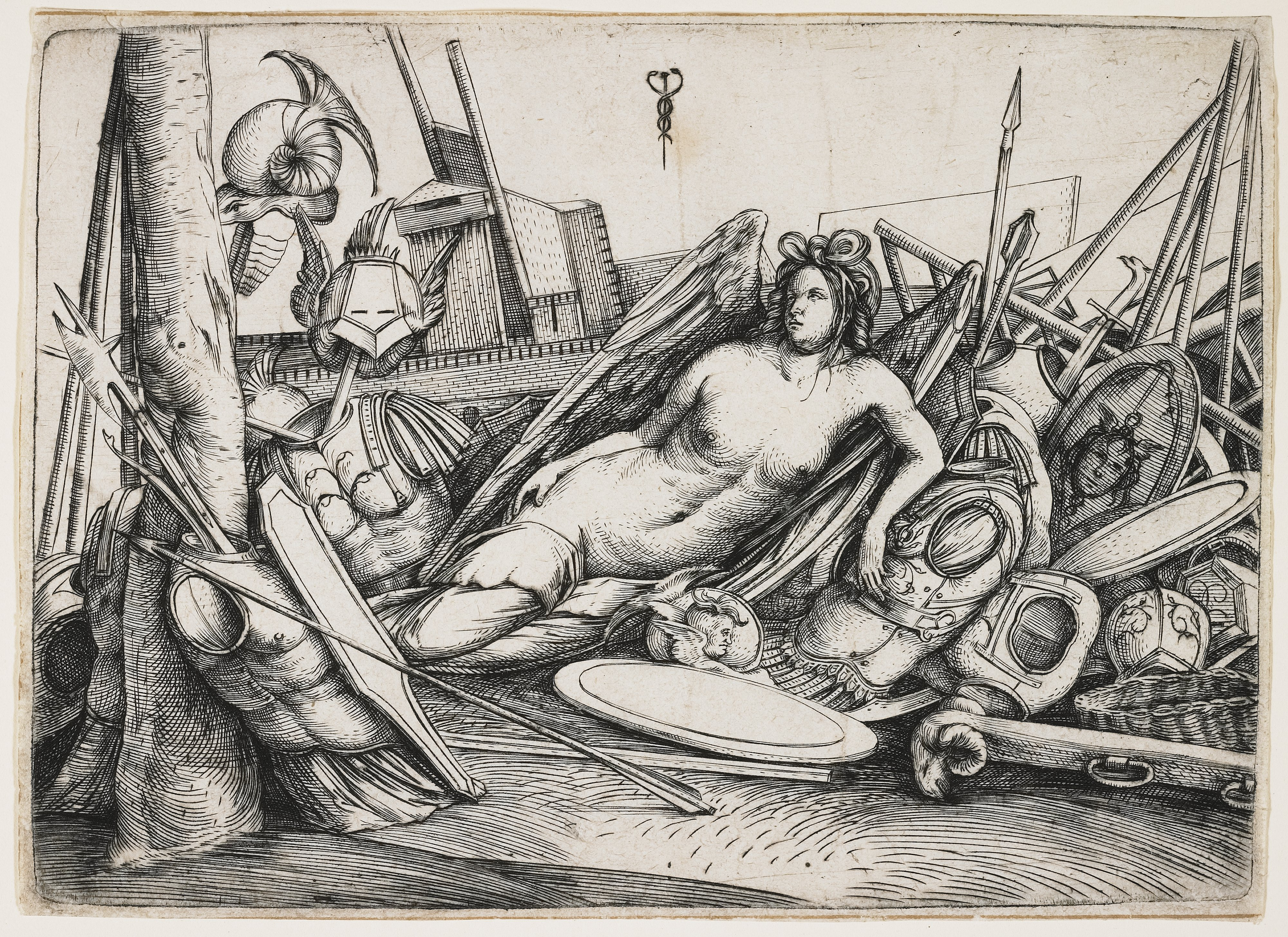
Victory Reclining Amid Trophies, engraving, c. 1510

His style is related to his possible master, Alvise Vivarini and to Giovanni Bellini, but has a languorous quality all its own. Apart from Dürer, the influence of Mantegna's technique also appears in what are probably the earlier engravings, done around the turn of the century, with parallel hatching. His engravings are mostly small, showing just a few figures. Truculent satyrs feature in several prints; there are a number of mythological subjects, including two Sacrifices to Priapus.

The earlier prints show figures with "small heads and somewhat shapeless bodies, with sloping shoulders and thick torsos supported by slender legs"—also seen in his paintings. Probably from a middle period come several nudes, the most famous being Apollo and Diana, St Sebastian and the Three Bound Captives. In these, his ability to organise the whole composition has greatly improved.

In a final group, the style becomes more Italianate, and the compositions more complex. These have an enigmatic, haunting atmosphere and a very refined technique. Levenson has proposed that they date from his period in the Netherlands and were influenced by the young Lucas van Leyden. The transmission between the Netherlands and Venice during this time was also prominent, as both regions were port cities booming with trade. As a result, not only were economies tied to one another, but art as well.

=== Paintings ===
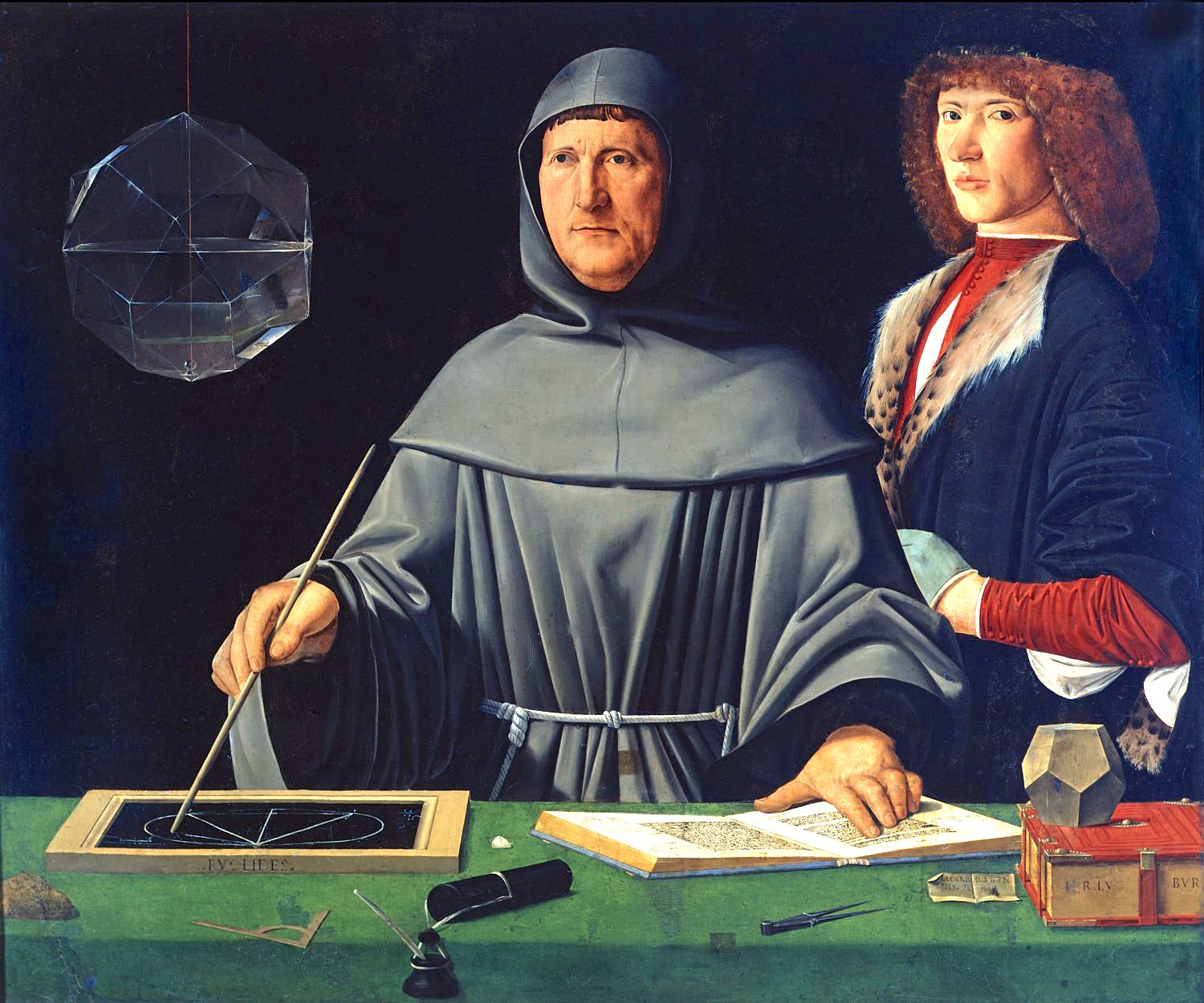
Painting of Luca Pacioli, attributed to Jacopo de' Barbari, 1495 (attribution controversial). Table is filled with geometrical tools: slate, chalk, compass, a dodecahedron model. A rhombicuboctahedron half-filled with water is suspended from the ceiling. Pacioli is demonstrating a theorem by Euclid.

His paintings are mostly portraits or half-length groups of religious figures. He painted a live Sparrowhawk (National Gallery, London), which is probably a fragment of a larger work. The very early still-life of a Still-Life with Partridge and Gauntlets (Alte Pinakothek, Munich) is often called the first small scale trompe-l'œil painting since antiquity; it may well have been the cover or reverse of a portrait (however, a fragmentary panel by another Venetian, Vittorio Carpaccio, has a trompe-l'œil letter-rack of about 1490 on the reverse). In the Gemäldegalerie, Berlin there is a Portrait of a German Man and a religious subject. The Louvre has a religious group, and Philadelphia has a pair of figures.

A disputed but famous work, the Portrait of Fra Luca Pacioli is in the Museo di Capodimonte in Naples. This shows the Franciscan mathematician and expert on perspective demonstrating geometry at a table on which lie his own Summa and a work by Euclid. He is accompanied by a not clearly identified student. The work is signed "IACO. BAR VIGEN/NIS 1495". Jacopo de' Barbari is attributed a Christ Blessing displayed at the Snite Museum of Art in Notre Dame University, Indiana.

== See also ==
- Old master print
