= Marco Zoppo =

Italian artist (1433–1478)

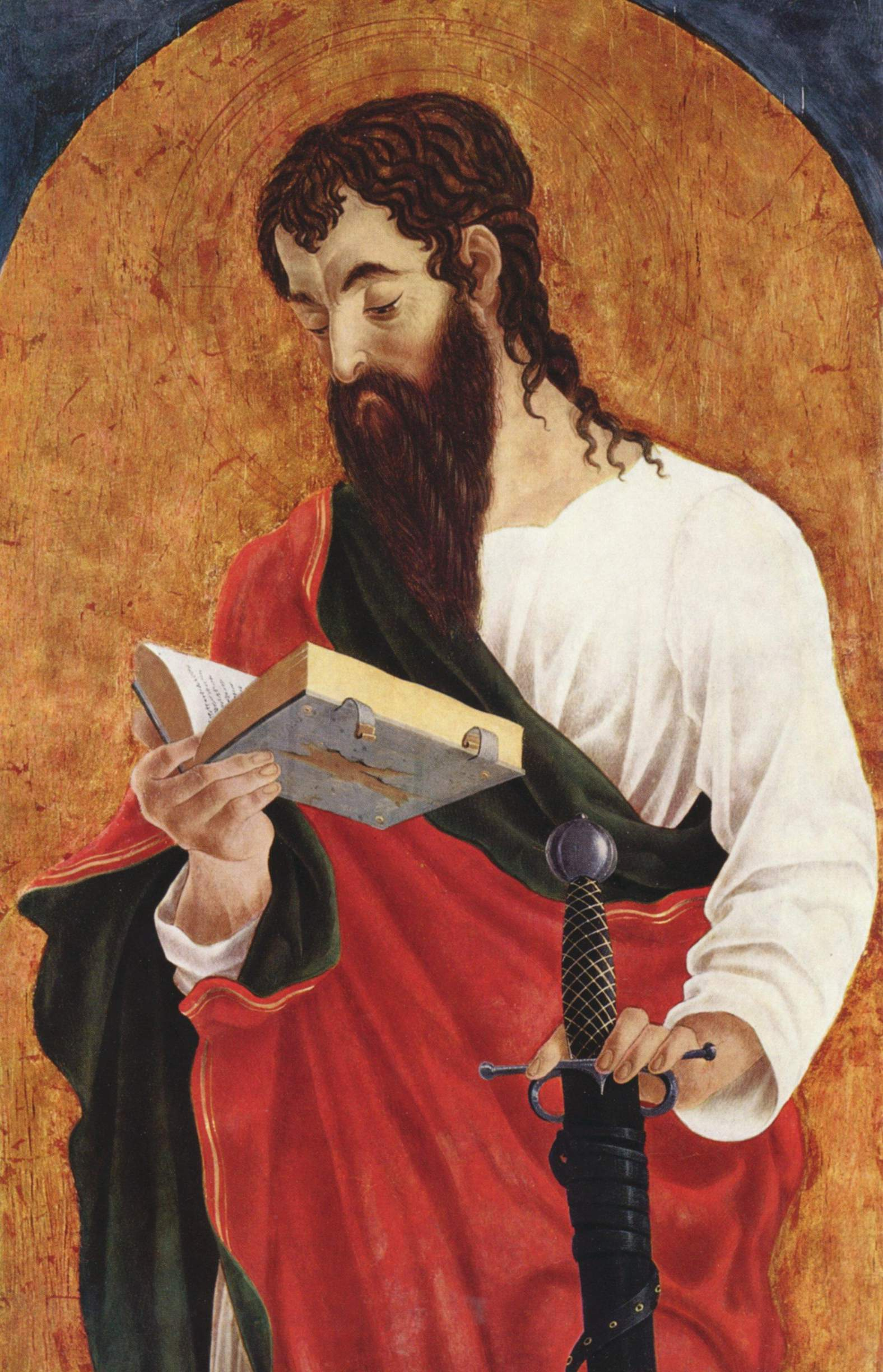
Image of Saint Paul

Marco Zoppo (1433 – 19 February 1498) was an Italian painter of the Renaissance period, active mainly in Bologna.

He was born in Cento. He was a pupil of the painter Lippo Dalmasio then for a few years with Francesco Squarcione around 1455. He was a contemporary of Andrea Mantegna. He painted a number of variations of the Virgin and Child Enthroned with Saints while he was in Bologna. Francesco Francia was one of his pupils. He died in Venice, where he had gone after working for Squarcione.

== Artistic career ==
The oldest document in which Marco Ruggieri, known as lo Zoppo, appears, dates back to 1452, when the young painter, living in his native Cento, is entrusted with the gilding of a statue of the Virgin and Child. The following year lo Zoppo is documented in Padua, in the workshop of the ‘tailor and embroiderer’ Francesco Squarcione, whose adopted son he soon became.

During these Paduan years, Zoppo was strongly influenced by the art of Donatello, who had recently finished the impressive bronze altarpiece of the Basilica del Santo, and by the contemporary work of Nicolò Pizolo and Andrea Mantegna, both employed in the family chapel of the Ovetari. As witness to his particular predilections, a few works survive, strongly influenced by the expressive physicality of the Tuscan sculptor and by the perspective solutions refined by the two Paduan painters in the Ovetari workshop. Among these are the Wimborne Madonna, named after a former owner, now preserved in the Louvre, and the Colville folio in the British Museum.

By September 1455 lo Zoppo was no longer in Padua, but in Venice where he appeared in court against his adoptive father, Squarcione, with whom he broke all personal and legal ties.

It is possible that Zoppo returned promptly to Bologna, perhaps already by 1456. The painter executed many important works there, among which are a painted Crucifix, preserved today in the Museo dei Cappuccini, and the ‘Retablo’ for the high altar of the Church of San Clemente in the Collegio di Spagna, completed in collaboration with the engraver Agostino De Marchi from Crema. Zoppo appears to have been involved in engraved drawings for various collections including for Giovanni Marcanova's Collectio Antiquitatum, finished in Bologna in 1465.

One very ambiguous and disputed picture is the Head of the Baptist in Pesaro, linked to Marco Zoppo following Berenson's attribution, but also given to Giovanni Bellini, as proposed instead by Roberto Longhi. Longhi's theory has been contested by Berenson in 1932, by Cesare Brandi in 1949 and by Robertson in 1960, but has been strongly defended by other important academics, such as Rodolfo Pallucchini and Alessandro Conti.

== List of works ==
- Madonna del Latte (1453-1455), Louvre, Paris
- Resurrezione, Metropolitan Museum of Art, New York City
- Madonna col Bambino, National Gallery of Art, Washington D.C.
- San Pietro, National Gallery of Art, Washington D.C.
- Madonna col Bambino, National Gallery of Art, Washington D.C.
- Sant'Agostino, National Gallery, London
- Cristo morto sostenuto da santi, National Gallery, London
- Cristo morto sostenuto da angeli e da san Giacomo, British Museum, London
- Madonna col Bambino e due putti, British Museum, London
- Cristo deposto sorretto dagli angeli, San Giovanni Battista, Pesaro
- San Girolamo nella selva, Thyssen-Bornemisza Museum, Madrid
- Madonna in trono e santi (1471), Gemäldegalerie, Berlin
- Il Crocifisso di Cesena, Cesena, private collection
- Saint Jerome in Penitence, Baltimore, Walters Art Museum
