= Dufour (surname) =

Dufour or Du Four or Defour is a surname. Notable people with the surname include:

== Dufour ==
- Alma Dufour (born 1990), French politician
- Amanda Ruter Dufour (1822–1899), American poet
- Antoine Dufour (born 1979), French-Canadian acoustic guitarist
- Barry Dufour (born 1942), British academic and author
- Bernard Dufour (1922–2016), French painter
- Camille Dufour (1925–2025), French trade unionist and politician
- Carmen Dufour (born 1954), Swiss author
- Catherine Dufour (born 1966), French SF and fantasy writer
- Cathrine Dufour (born 1992), Danish Olympic dressage rider and influencer
- Charles Dufour (born 1940), Archbishop emeritus of the Roman Catholic Archdiocese of Kingston, Jamaica
- Charles L. Dufour (1903–1996), American newspaper journalist and author
- Damien Dufour (born 1981), French footballer
- Dany-Robert Dufour (born 1947), French philosopher
- Denis Dufour (born 1953), composer
- Diane Dufour, Canadian politician in the 1985 Quebec provincial election
- Fabienne Dufour (born 1981), Belgian swimmer
- Francis Dufour (1929–2020), Quebec politician
- François Dufour (born 1953), French politician
- Frédéric Dufour (born 1976), French rower
- Georges Joseph Dufour (1758–1820), French General of the Revolutionary Army
- Guillaume Henri Dufour (1787–1875), Swiss general, bridge engineer and topographer
- Guy Dufour (born 1987), Belgian football (soccer) player
- Hortense Dufour (born 1946), French writer
- Jean Dufour (1818–1883) (1818–1883), French politician
- Jean Dufour (1949–2020), French politician
- Jean-Marie Dufour (born 1949), Canadian econometrician and statistician at McGill University
- Joseph Dufour (1744–1829), political figure from Lower Canada
- Kirsten Dufour (born 1941), Danish visual artist
- Léon Jean Marie Dufour (1780–1865), French medical doctor and naturalist
- Lisette Dufour (born 1949), Québécoise voice actress
- Louis Dufour (1901–1960), Swiss ice hocker player
- Luc Dufour (born 1963), ice hockey player
- Lynsey DuFour, American soap opera writer
- Marc Dufour (1941–2015), Canadian ice hockey player
- Marc Dufour (ophthalmologist) (1843–1910), Swiss ophthalmologist
- Marie-France Dufour (1949–1990)
- Marjolain Dufour (born 1958), Québécois politician
- Nicolas Dufour (born 1987), Canadian politician
- Paul Dufour, drummer with The Libertines
- Philippe Sylvestre Dufour (1622–1687), French Protestant apothecary, banker, and author
- Pierre Dufour (canoeist) (fl, 1950s), Swiss slalom canoeist
- Pierre Dufour (politician), Canadian politician and businessman
- Pierre Dufour, pseudonym of Paul Lacroix used when publishing Histoire de la prostitution
- Pierre Dufour d'Astafort, French equestrian and Olympic medalist
- Pierre-Eugène Dufour (1855–1922), pseudonym of Paterne Berrichon, French poet, painter, sculptor and designer
- Richard DuFour (1947–2017), American educational researcher
- Sergio Gama Dufour (born 1966), Mexican politician
- Simon Dufour (born 1979), French swimmer who swam at the 2008 Olympics
- Sylvain Dufour (born 1982), French alpine snowboarder
- Thomas Dufour (born 1973), French curler
- Val Dufour (1927–2000), American actor
- Vincent Dufour (born 1969), former French football player
- Wafah Dufour (born 1975), American model
- William Dufour (born 2002), Canadian ice hockey player
- Carmine Pierre-Dufour, Canadian film director and screenwriter

== Du Four ==
- Vital du Four (1260–1327), French Franciscan theologian and scholastic philosopher; and cardinal
- François du Four (1871–1945), Belgian industrialist
- Louis Du Four de Longuerue (1652–1733), antiquarian, linguist and historian, known as abbé de Longuerue

== Defour ==
- Steven Defour (born 1988), Belgian soccer player
- Mark Defour, U.S.V.I. national cycling champ, see 2013 national road cycling championships

=== Characters ===
- Corinne Dufour, helicopter pilot in Moonraker

== See also ==
- Dufour (disambiguation)
- Dufour-Lapointe, a surname
