= Pierre Dufour =

Pierre Dufour may refer to:

- Pierre Dufour (canoeist), Swiss slalom canoeist
- Pierre Dufour (politician), Canadian politician and businessman
- Pierre Dufour, pseudonym of French author and journalist Paul Lacroix
- Pierre Dufour, executed for homosexuality in 1600

== See also ==
- Pierre Dufour d'Astafort, French equestrian
- Dufour (surname)
