= Lapointe =

Lapointe, La Pointe, laPoint, le-Pointe, or le point may refer to:

== Places ==
=== United States ===
- La Pointe, an antiquated name for Galena, Illinois
- Lapoint, Utah, USA, an unincorporated community
- La Pointe, Wisconsin, an unincorporated community
- La Pointe (town), Wisconsin, a town
- La Pointe County, Wisconsin

=== Other places ===
- Lapointe (electoral district), a former Canadian electoral riding
- Lapointe, Nord-Ouest, Haiti
- Le Point (Hong Kong), a housing estate in Hong Kong
- La Pointe, Saint Barthélemy

== Other ==
- Lapointe (surname)
- Le Point, French weekly news magazine
- Le Point (TV series), a former Canadian television news series

== See also ==
- Dufour-Lapointe
- Point (disambiguation)
