= The Goldfinch (painting) =

1654 painting by Carel Fabritius

- Het puttertje (Dutch)
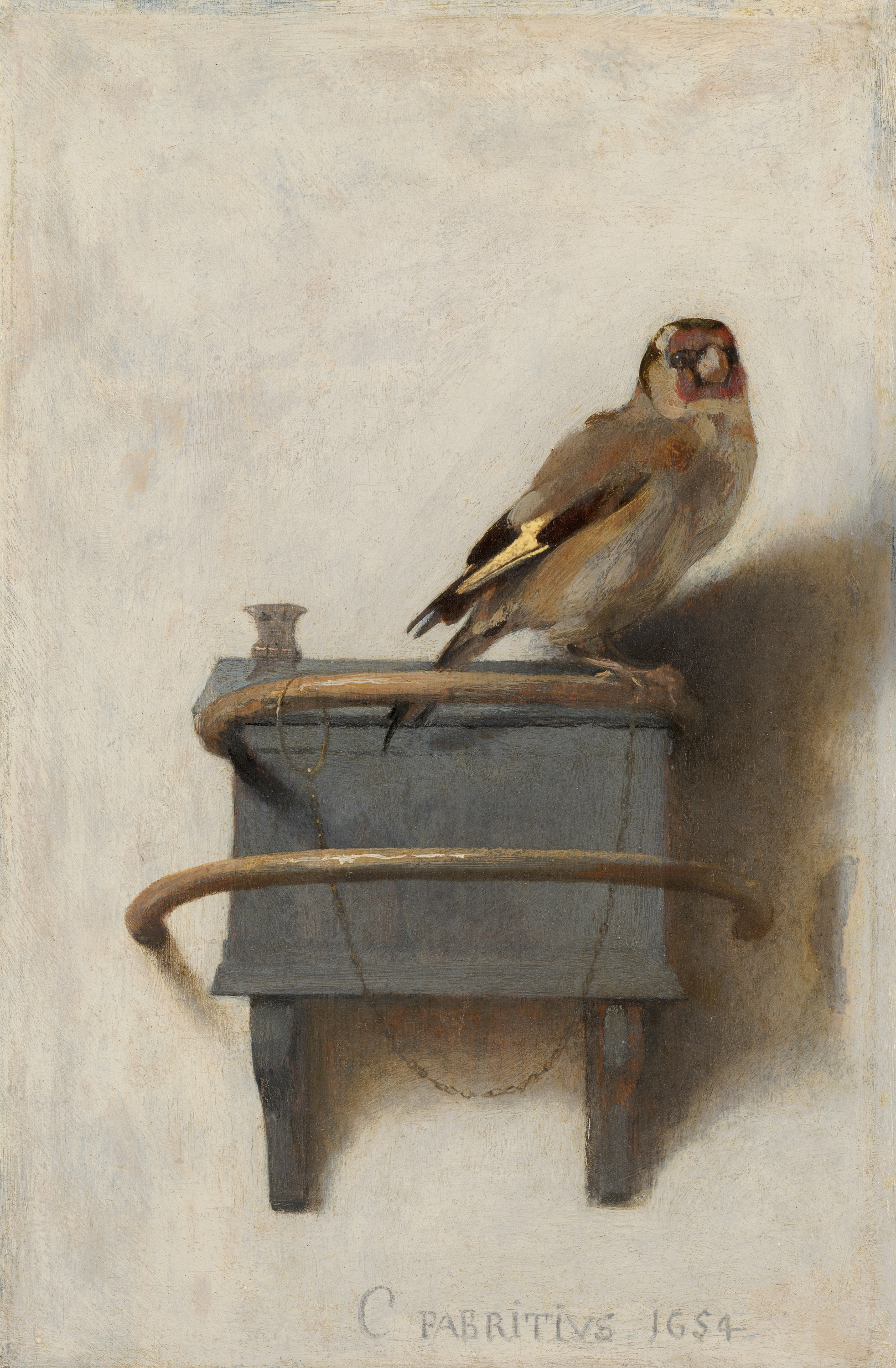
- Artist: Carel Fabritius
- Year: 1654
- Type: Bird painting
- Medium: Oil on panel
- Movement: Dutch Golden Age painting
- Subject: European goldfinch
- Dimensions: 33.5 cm × 22.8 cm (13.2 in × 9.0 in)
- Location: Mauritshuis, The Hague, Netherlands
- Accession: 1896

The Goldfinch (Dutch: Het puttertje) is an oil painting by Carel Fabritius, a Dutch Golden Age artist, of a life-sized chained European goldfinch. Signed and dated 1654, it has been in the collection of the Mauritshuis in The Hague, Netherlands since 1896. The work is a trompe-l'œil oil on panel measuring 33.5 by 22.8 centimetres (13.2 in × 9.0 in) that was once part of a larger structure, perhaps a window jamb or a protective cover. It is possible that the painting was in its creator's workshop in Delft at the time of the gunpowder explosion that killed him and destroyed much of the city.

A common and colourful bird with a pleasing song, the goldfinch was a popular pet, and could be taught simple tricks including lifting a thimble-sized bucket of water. It was reputedly a bringer of good health, and was used in Italian Renaissance painting as a symbol of Christian redemption and the Passion of Jesus.

The Goldfinch is unusual for the Dutch Golden Age painting period in the simplicity of its composition and use of illusionary techniques. Following the death of its creator, it was lost for more than two centuries before its rediscovery in Brussels.

The painting was featured in a Dutch Golden Age world tour in 2012–2014, and was the centrepiece of a 2026 bird art exhibition at the Mauritshuis. An eponymous novel by the US author Donna Tartt won the 2014 Pulitzer Prize for fiction and led to a 2019 film.

== Description ==
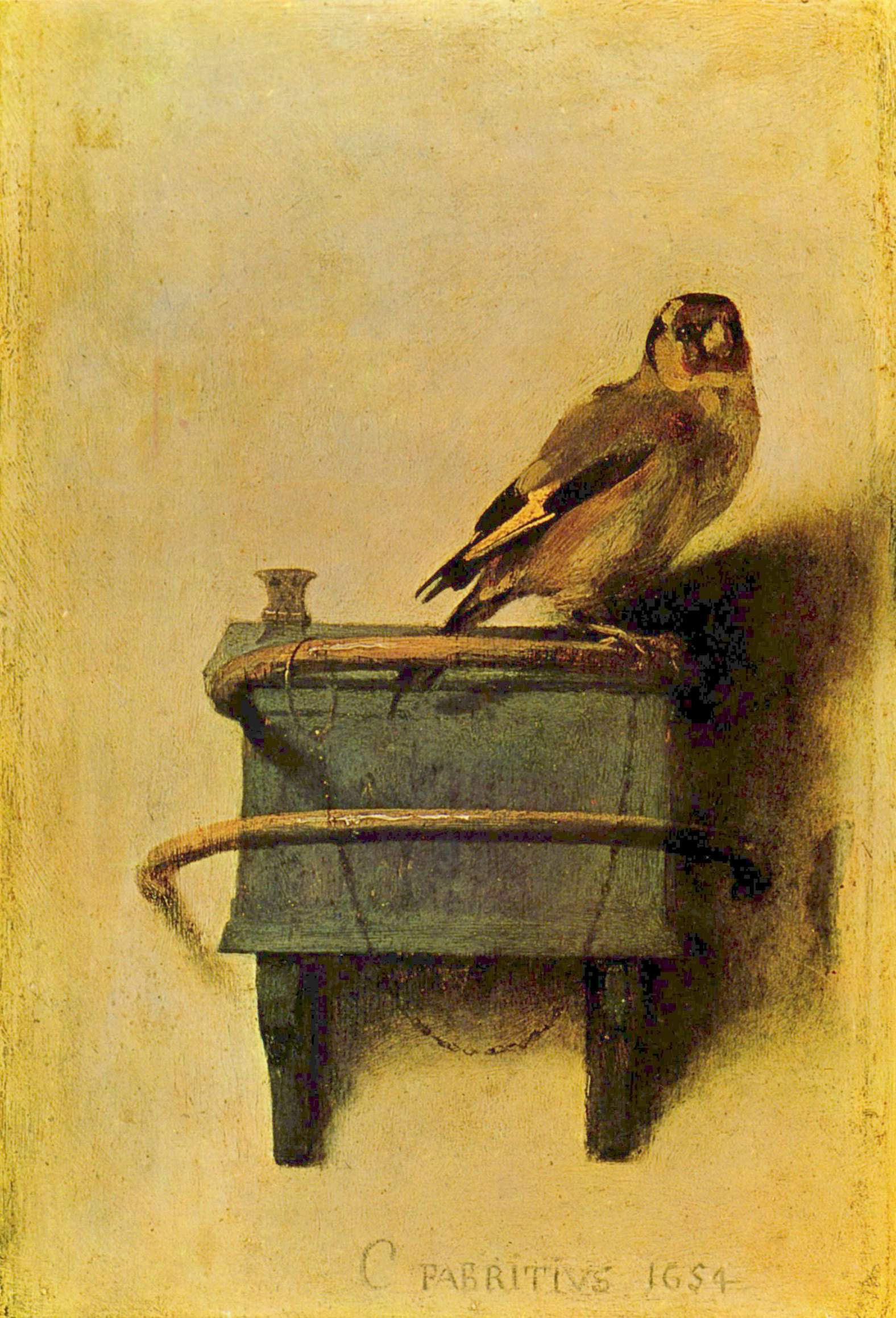
The painting prior to the 2003 restoration

The Goldfinch is an oil painting on panel from 1654 measuring 33.5 by 22.8 centimetres (13.2 in × 9.0 in). Details of its physical structure emerged when it was restored in 2003. Because the lead-based paint limited the effectiveness of traditional X-rays and infrared, the chief conservator Jorgen Wadum used a CT scanner to see what was under the lead paint layer.

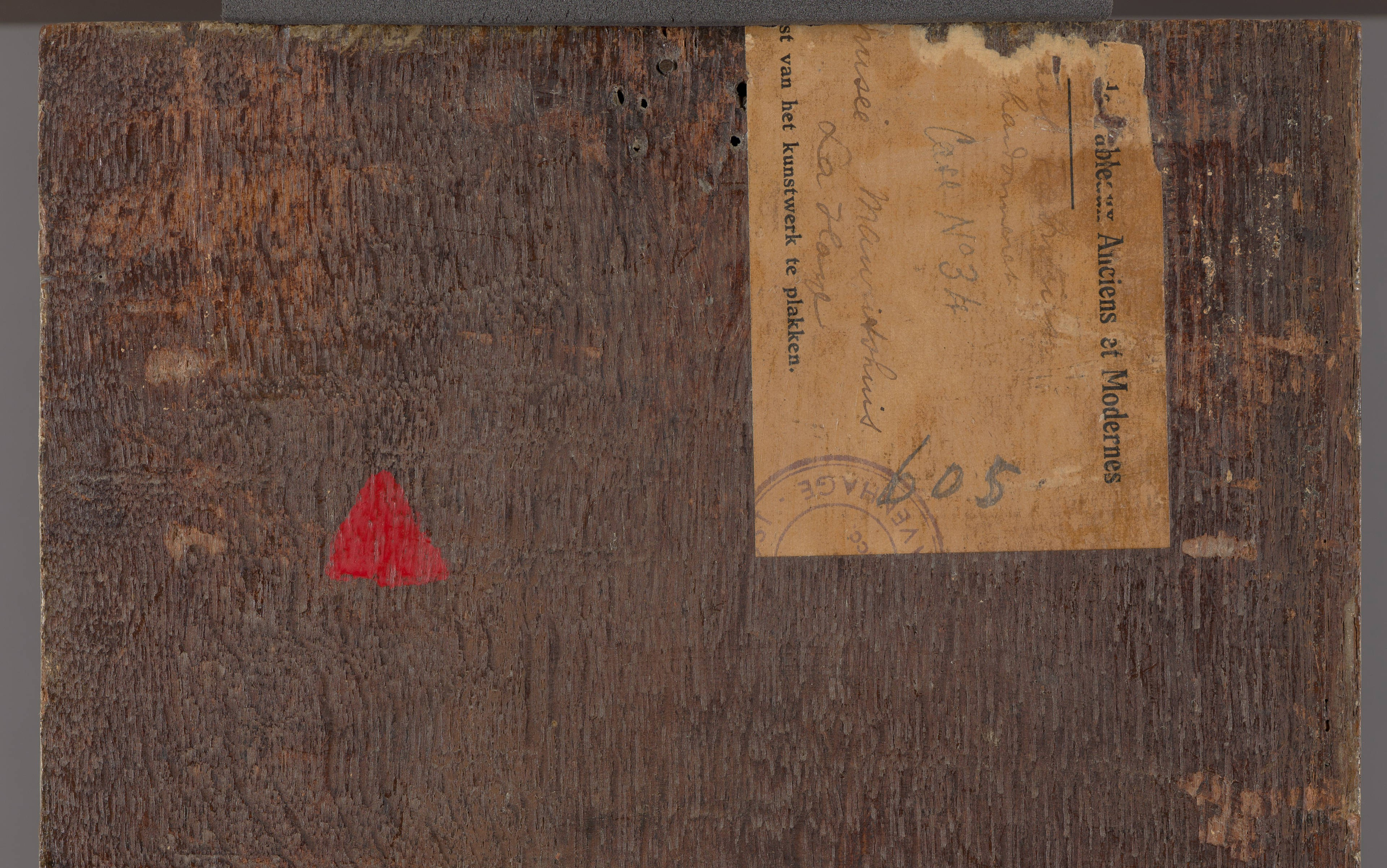
Part of The Goldfinch back panel, showing the red triangle

The panel on which it is painted is 8–10 millimetres (0.31–0.39 in) thick, which is atypically deep for a small painting, and indicates that it may have formerly been part of a larger piece of wood. Evidence for this is the remains of a wooden pin, suggesting the original boards had been joined with dowels and glue. Before it was framed, the painting had a 2-centimetre (0.79 in) black border onto which a gilded frame was later fixed with ten equally spaced nails. The nails did not reach the back of the panel, so there is no evidence of a backing to the picture. The frame was subsequently removed, leaving only a residual line of a greenish copper compound from the gilt. Fabritius then extended the white background pigment to the right edge, repainted his signature, and added the lower perch. Finally, the remaining black edges were overpainted with white.

The back of the panel has four nail holes and six other holes near the top, suggesting two different methods of suspension of the panel at various times. The art historian Linda Stone-Ferrier has suggested that the panel may have been either attached to the inner jamb of a window or have been a hinged protective cover for another wall-mounted painting.

There is a small red triangle on the back of the panel, added in 1938 as the threat of a European war loomed. This symbol was used to indicate that a work was irreplaceable.

During conservation, it was realised that the surface of the painting had numerous small dents that must have been formed when the paint was still not fully dried, since there was no cracking. It is possible that the slight damage was caused by the explosion that killed its creator. The restoration removed the old yellow varnish and showed the original tones, described by the French art critic and journalist Théophile Thoré-Bürger in 1859 as "pale wall" (mur blême) and "bright colour" (lumineuse couleur).

== The subject ==
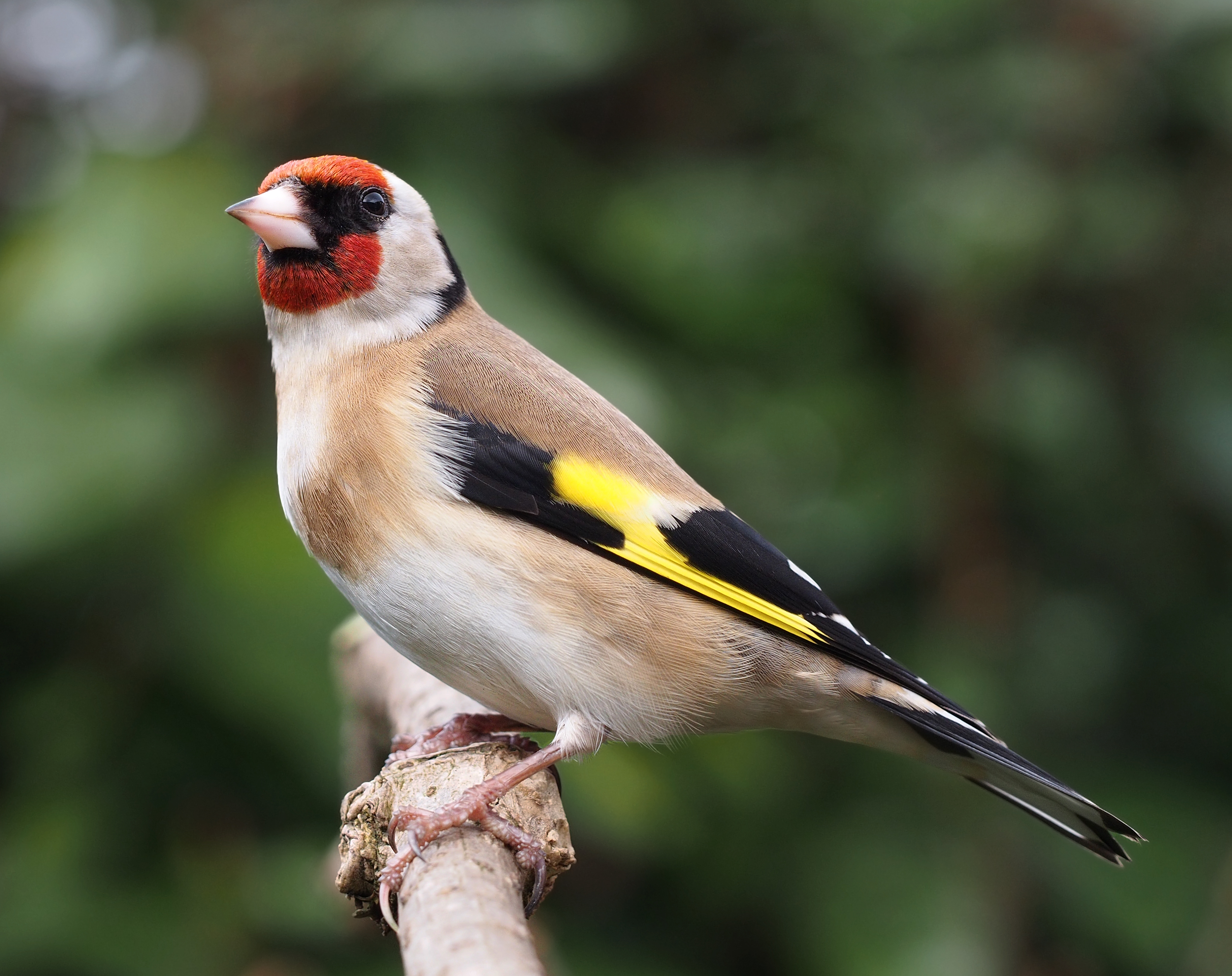
A European goldfinch (Carduelis carduelis)

The painting shows a life-size European goldfinch (Carduelis carduelis) on top of a feeder—a blue container with a lid, enclosed by two wooden half-rings fixed to the wall. The bird is perched on the upper ring, to which its leg is attached by a fine chain. The painting is signed and dated "C fabritivs 1654" at the bottom.

The goldfinch is a widespread and common seed-eating bird in Europe, North Africa, and western and central Asia. As a colourful species with a pleasant twittering song, and an associated belief that it brought health and good fortune, it had been domesticated for at least 2,000 years. Pliny the Elder recorded that it could be taught to do tricks, and in the 17th century, it became fashionable to train goldfinches to draw water from a bowl with a miniature bucket on a chain. The Dutch title of the painting is the bird's nickname, puttertje, which refers to this custom and is a diminutive equivalent to "draw-water", an old Norfolk name for the bird. (Note: Other goldfinch tricks included opening their food boxes or pulling a tiny cart of seeds.)

The goldfinch frequently appears in paintings, not just for its colourful appearance but also for its symbolic meanings. Pliny associated the bird with fertility, and the presence of a giant goldfinch next to a naked couple in The Garden of Earthly Delights triptych by the earlier Dutch master Hieronymus Bosch perhaps refers to this belief.

Nearly 500 Renaissance religious paintings, mainly by Italian artists, show the bird, including Leonardo da Vinci's Madonna Litta (1490–1491), Raphael's Madonna of the Goldfinch (1506) and Piero della Francesca's Nativity (1470–1475) (Note: Friedmann listed 486 paintings by 254 artists, of whom 214 were Italian, including da Vinci's Madonna Litta (1490–1491), Raphael's Madonna of the Goldfinch (1506) and Piero della Francesca's Nativity (1470).) In Medieval Christianity, the goldfinch's association with health symbolises the Redemption, and its habit of feeding on the seeds of spiky thistles, together with its red face, presaged the crucifixion of Jesus, where the bird supposedly became splattered with blood while attempting to remove the crown of thorns. Many of these devotional paintings were created in the middle of the 14th century while the Black Death pandemic gripped Europe.

The symbolism persisted long after the time of Fabritius. A much later example of the goldfinch as a symbol of redemption is Hogarth's 1742 painting The Graham Children. Thomas, the youngest, had died by the time the painting was completed.

=== The goldfinch in art ===
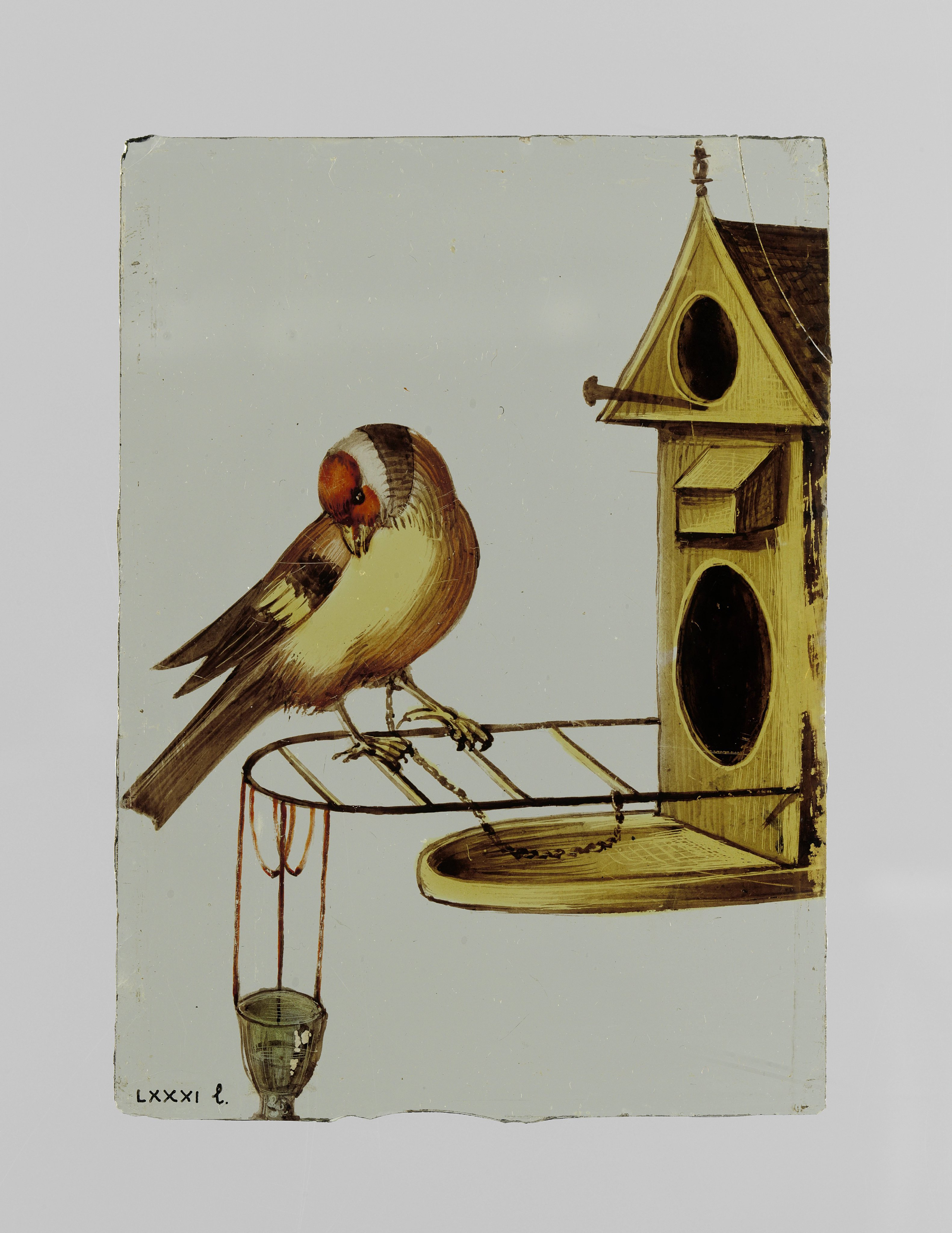
Goldfinch with chain and "bucket". Anonymous Dutch grisaille painting on glass 1650–1675

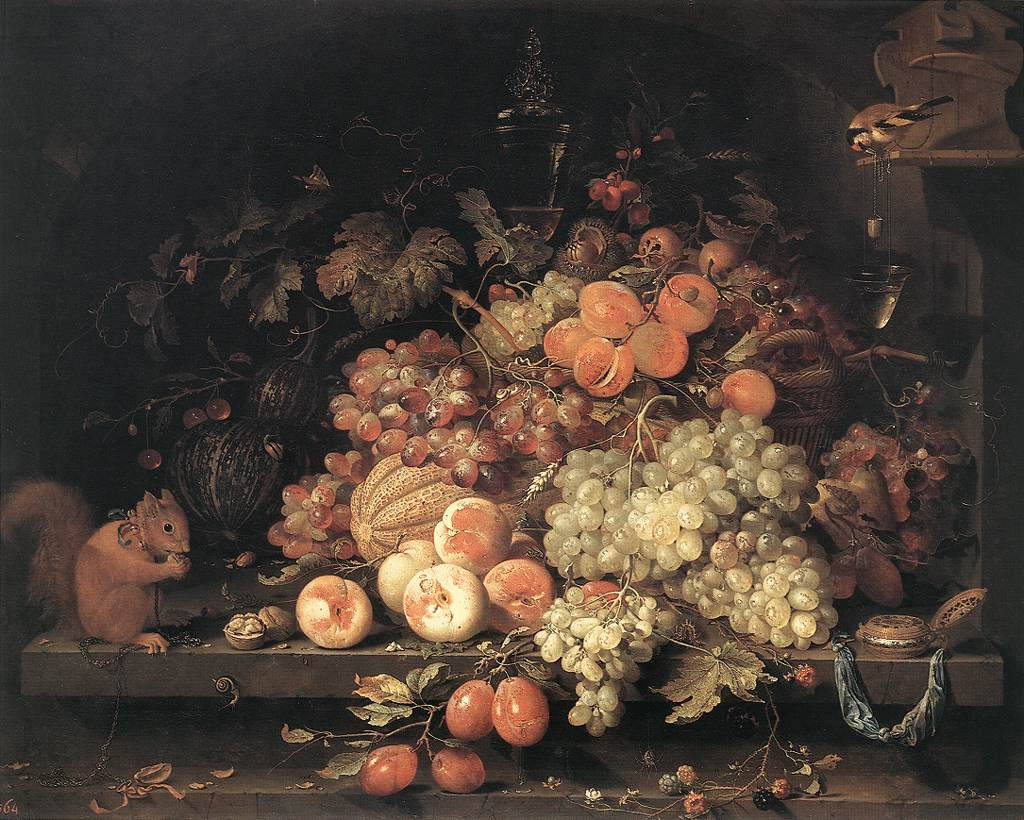
Fruit Still-Life with Squirrel and Goldfinch by Abraham Mignon (c. 1668) shows the water-drawing behaviour of the bird.

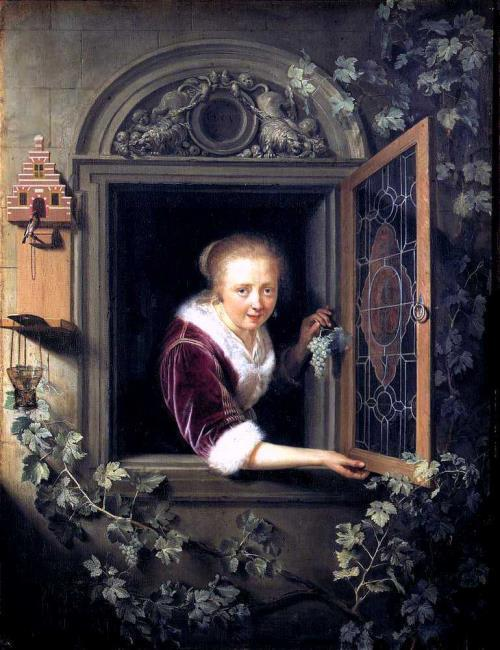
A Girl in a Window with a Bunch of Grapes (1662) by Gerrit Dou also depicts this trick

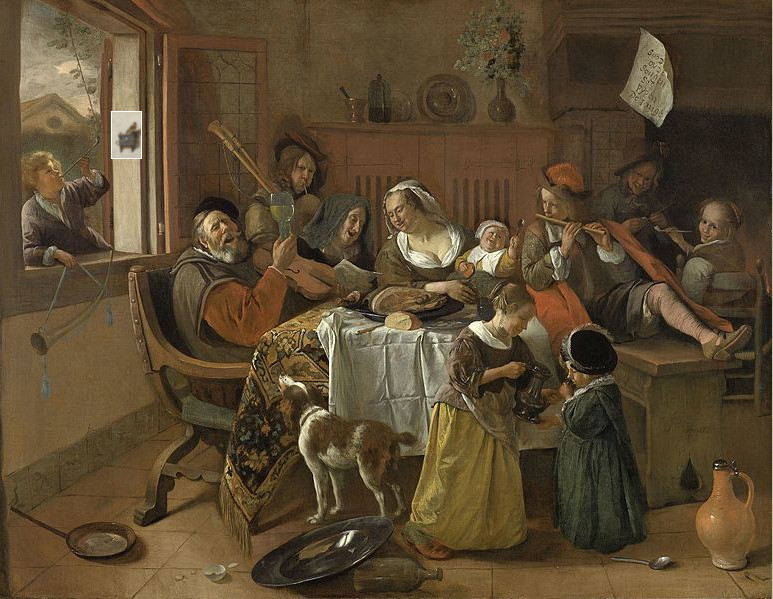
A mock-up of The Happy Family by Jan Steen (1668) with The Goldfinch (outlined in white) on the window jamb to show how it might have been displayed. (Note: This mock-up is based on one by Linda Stone-Ferrier in her article, using the same Jan Steen painting.)

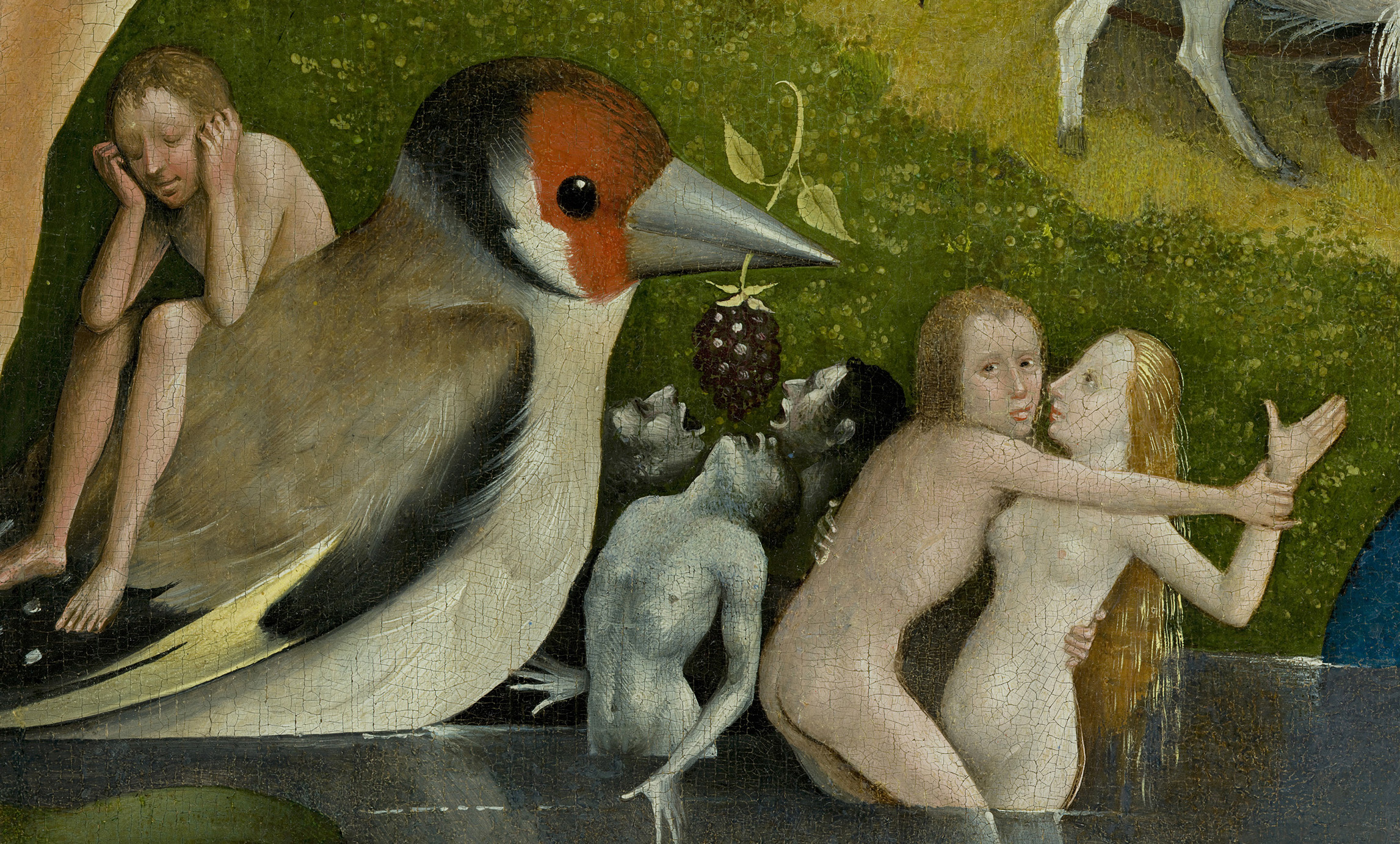
Detail from The Garden of Earthly Delights (1495–1505) by Hieronymus Bosch showing a giant goldfinch symbolising fertility

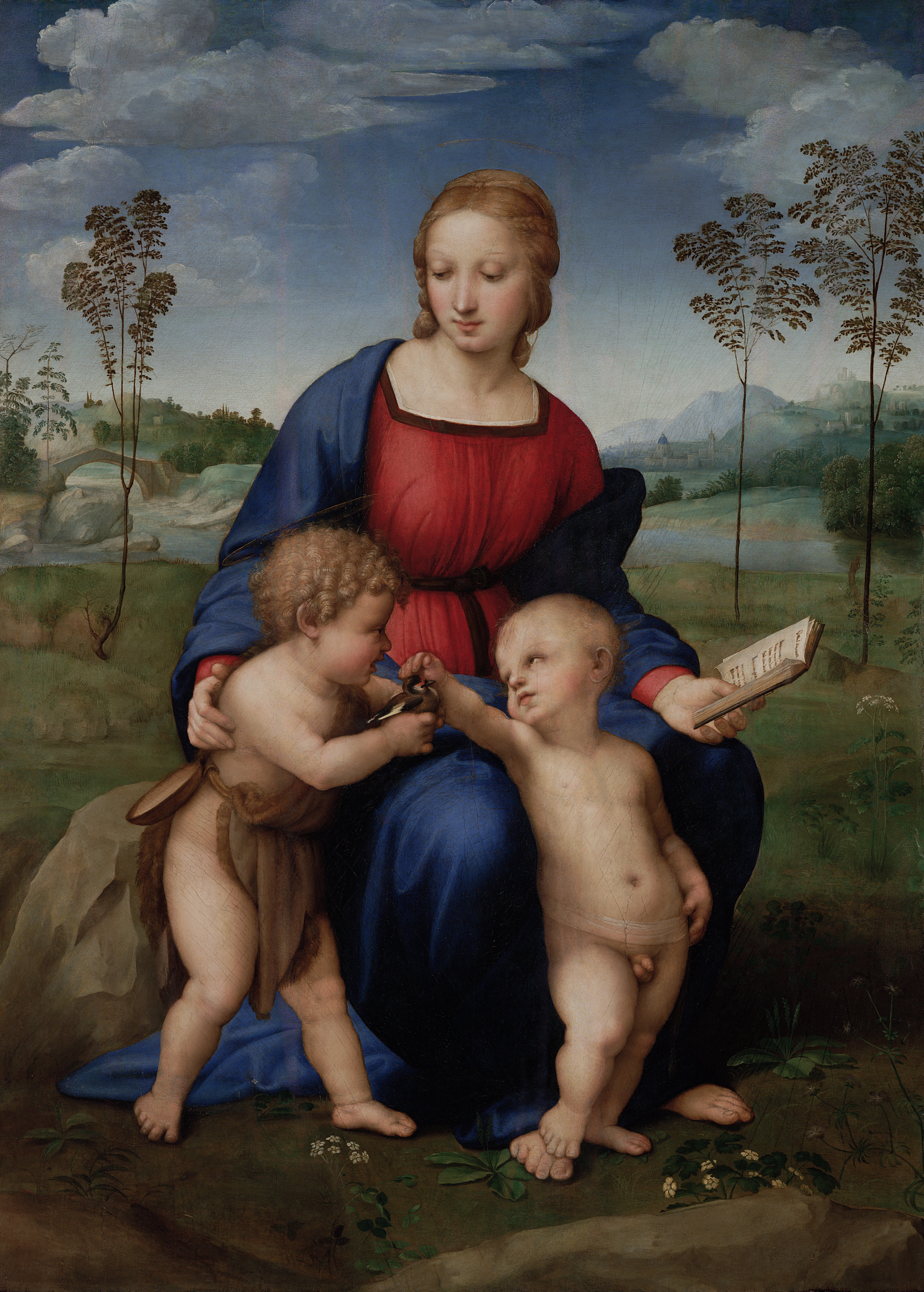
Madonna of the Goldfinch (1505–1506) by Raphael

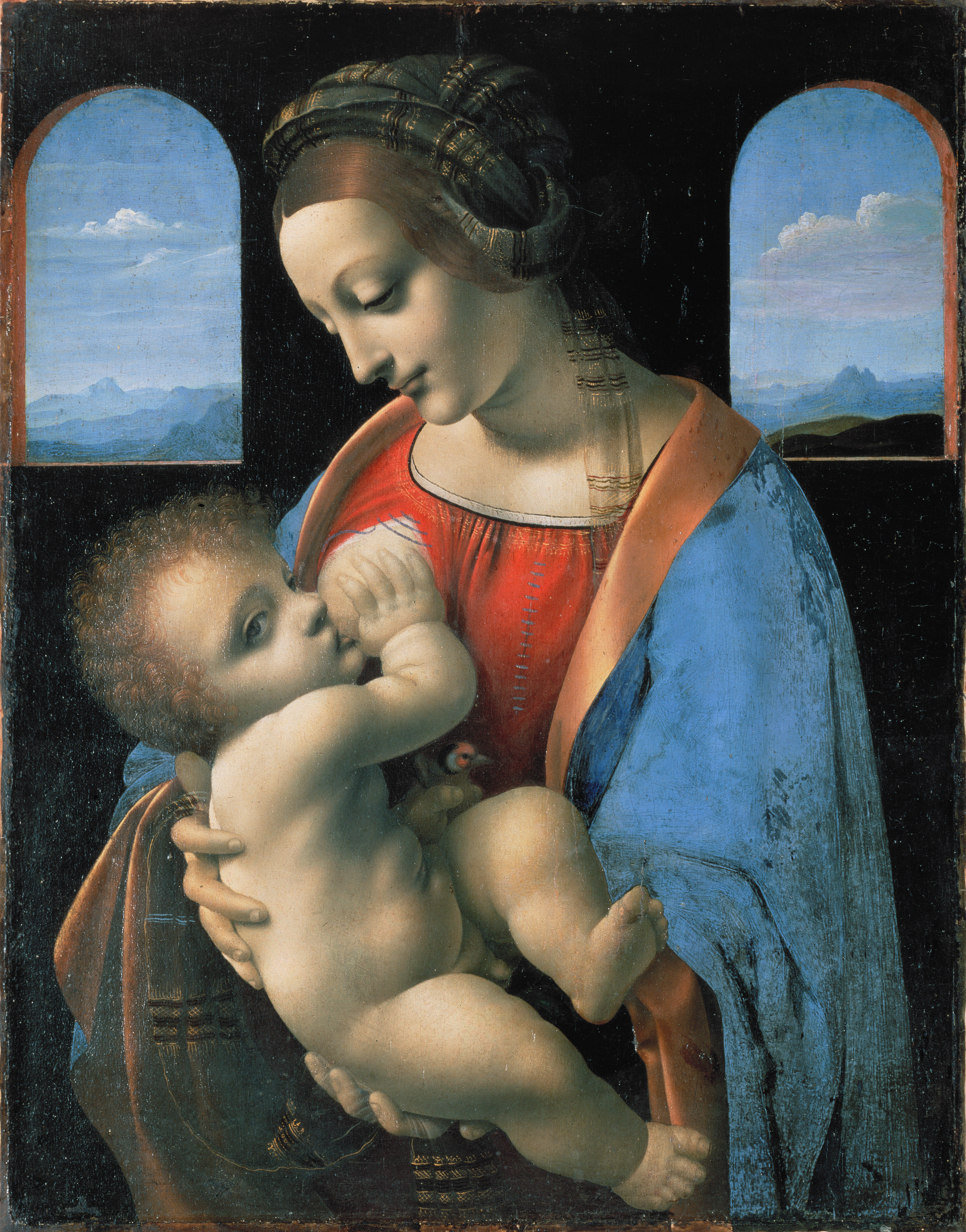
Madonna Litta (mid-1490s) by Leonardo da Vinci

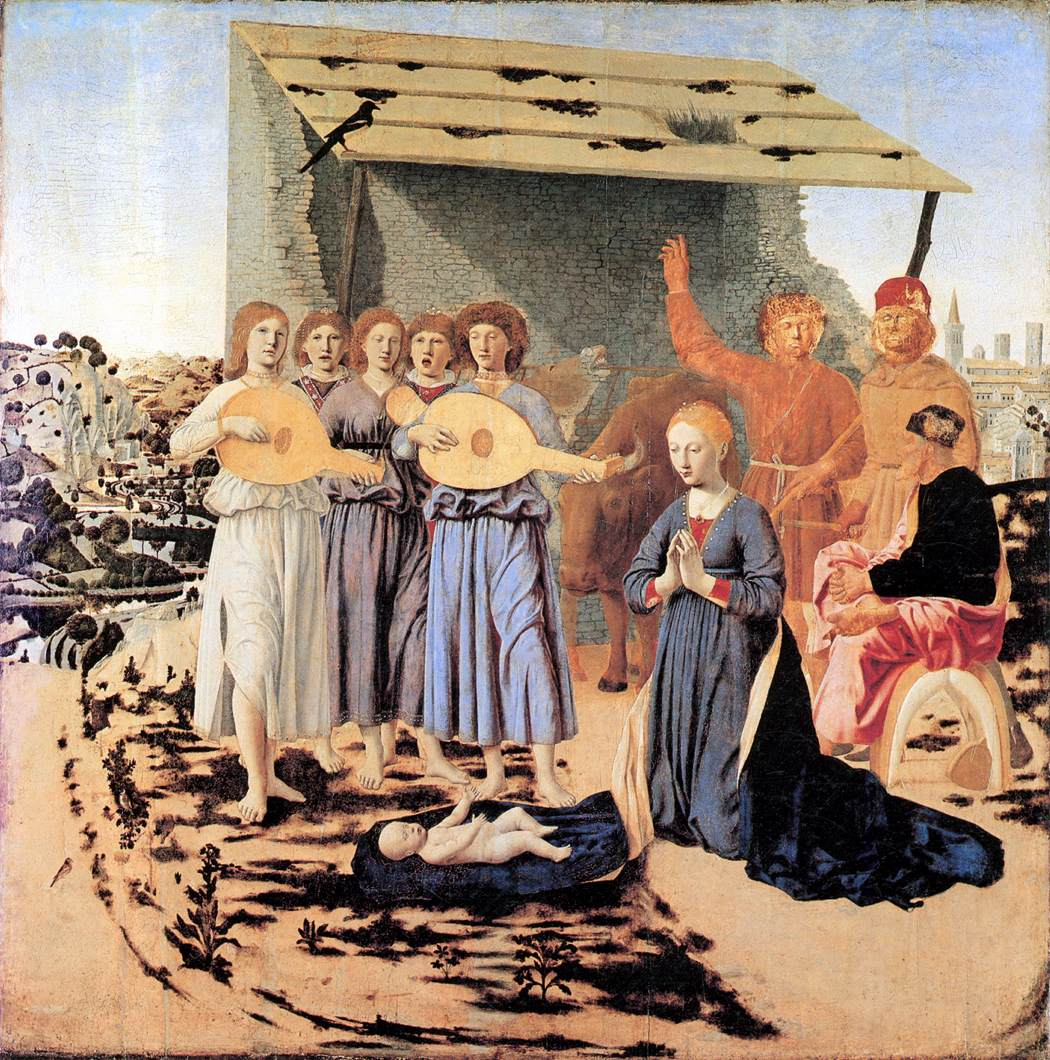
The Nativity (1470–1475) by Piero della Francesca. The goldfinch is in the shrub to the left of the foot of the leftmost musician.

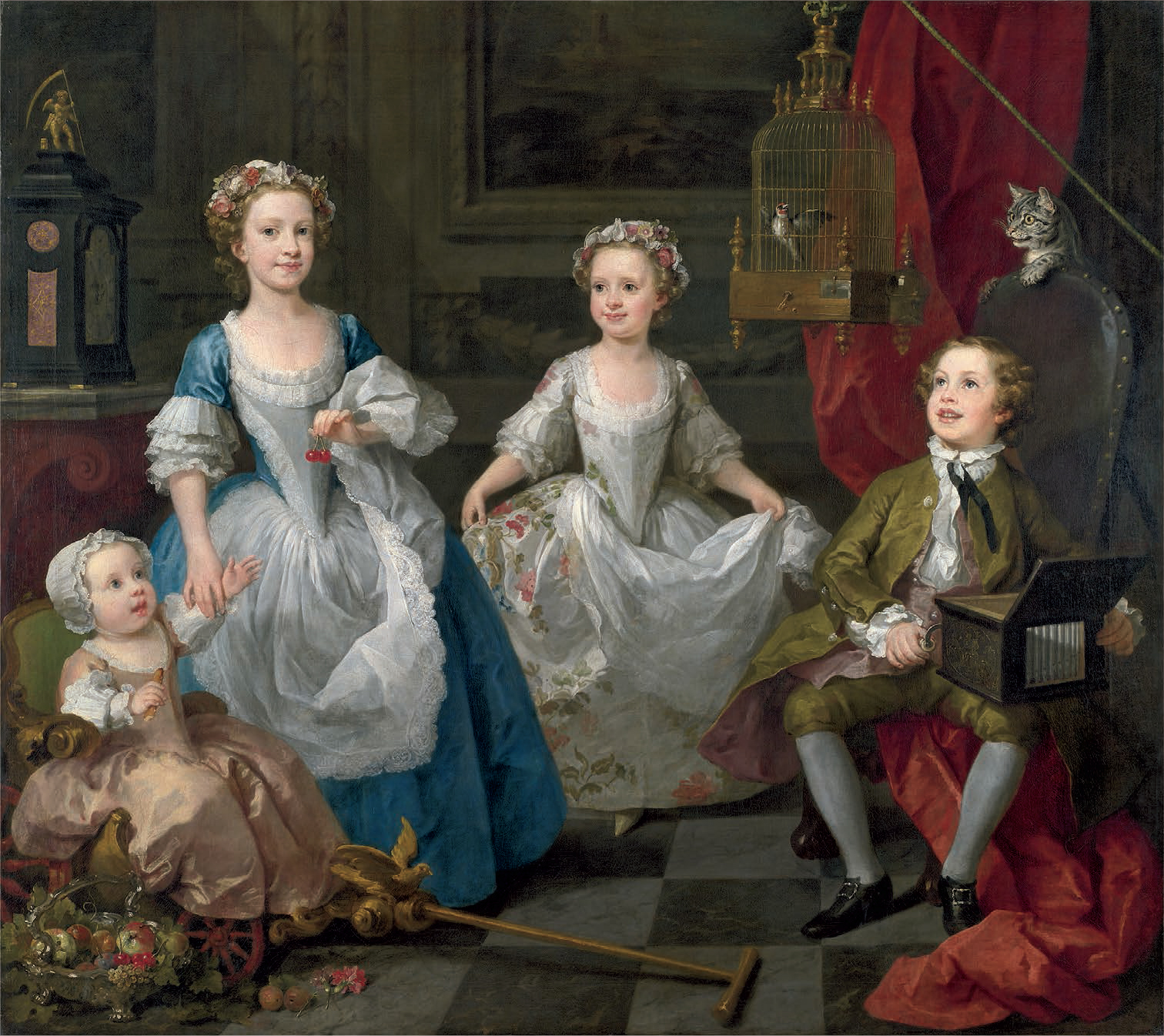
The Graham Children (1742) by William Hogarth

== Style ==
The Goldfinch is a trompe-l'œil painting which uses artistic techniques to create the illusion of depth, notably through foreshortening of the head, but also by highlights on the rings and the bird's foot, and strong shadows on the plastered wall. Bold strokes of bright colours above and lighter touches of duller colours below also accentuate the visual effect. The viewpoint seems to be from slightly below the bird, suggesting it was intended to be mounted in an elevated position. The lack of a frame initially also suggests the painting may have been mounted to look realistic, and may have been part of a larger assemblage of illusionary paintings.

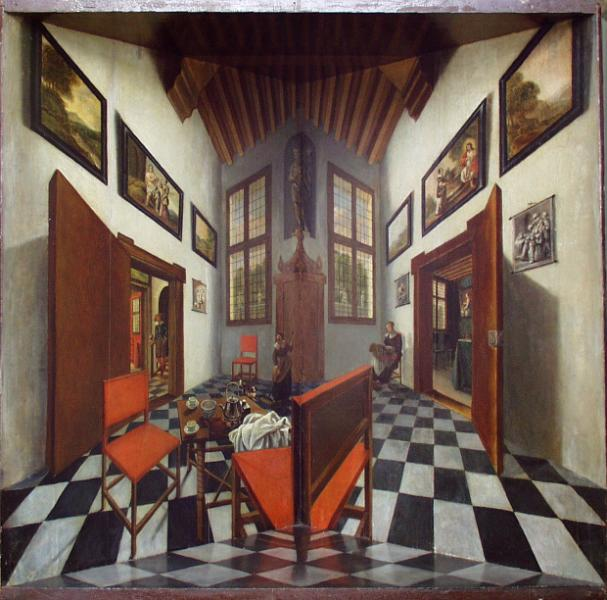
A perspective box by Pieter Janssens Elinga at the Museum Bredius (Note: Only six perspective boxes are known to be still intact. Samuel van Hoogstraten also made one, now in the National Gallery.)

Stone-Ferrier's supposition that it may at one time have been part of a window jamb relies in part on the painting giving the illusion of a real perched bird to passers-by, which is consistent with a raised location. She notes the importance of windows as picture settings during the Dutch Golden Age and the use of perspective boxes to create realistic interiors. Fabritius used a perspective box to create depth in other paintings, including his A View of Delft.

Fabritius used lead white paint as the base for the cream plaster of the walls, contrasting with the tan shadow of the bird. The art historian Andrew Graham-Dixon considered that the blend of colours in the diffuse shadow foreshadowed some of the techniques of the 19th-century French Impressionist and Post-Impressionist artists.

The trompe-l'œil technique has been known since ancient times, Pliny telling the story of Zeuxis painting grapes so real that birds flew down to peck at them. Jacopo de' Barbari's A Sparrowhawk is a Renaissance example of a painting that seemed intended to be mounted to create an illusion of reality to people passing the window. Although several of Fabritius's contemporaries, including his master Rembrandt, used similar effects, the depiction of a single bird is a minimalist version of the genre, and the simplicity of the design combined with the perspective technique in The Goldfinch is unique among paintings of the Dutch Golden Age. Fabritius had previously experimented with trompe-l'œil with the realistic nail that appears to be protruding from his 1649 Portrait of Abraham de Potter.

The art historian Wilhelm Martin (1876–1954) considered that The Goldfinch could only be compared with the Still-Life with Partridge and Gauntlets painted by Jacopo de' Barbari in 1504, more than a hundred years earlier. The bird itself was created with broad brush strokes, with only minor later corrections to its outline, while details, including the chain, were added with more precision. Fabritius's style differs from Rembrandt's typical chiaroscuro in his use of cool daylight, complex perspective, and dark figures against a light background. He retains some of his master's techniques, such as using the handle end of the brush to scratch lines through thick paint, as he did with the goldfinch's bright lead-tin yellow wing panel.

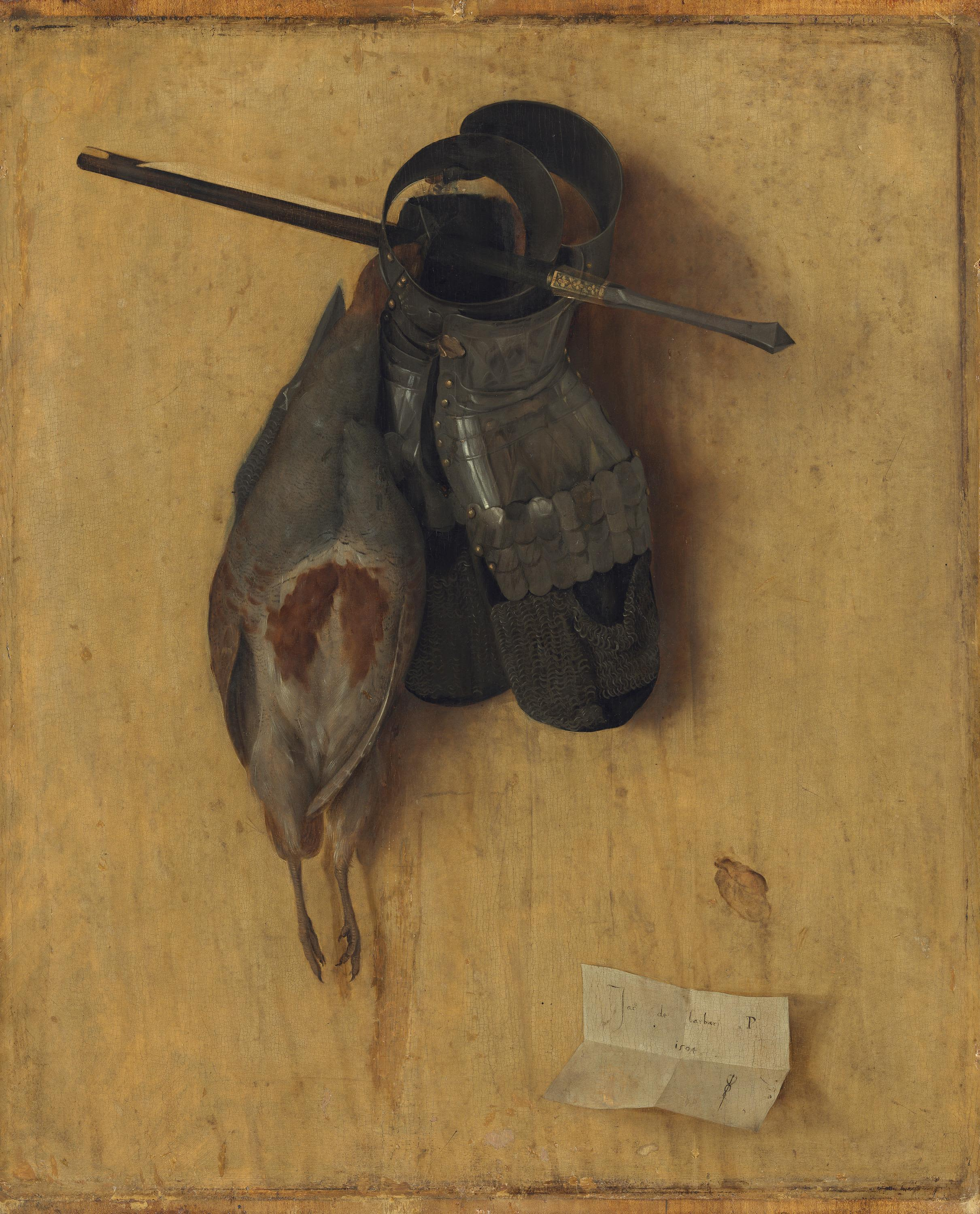
Still-Life with Partridge and Gauntlets (1504) by Jacopo de' Barbari

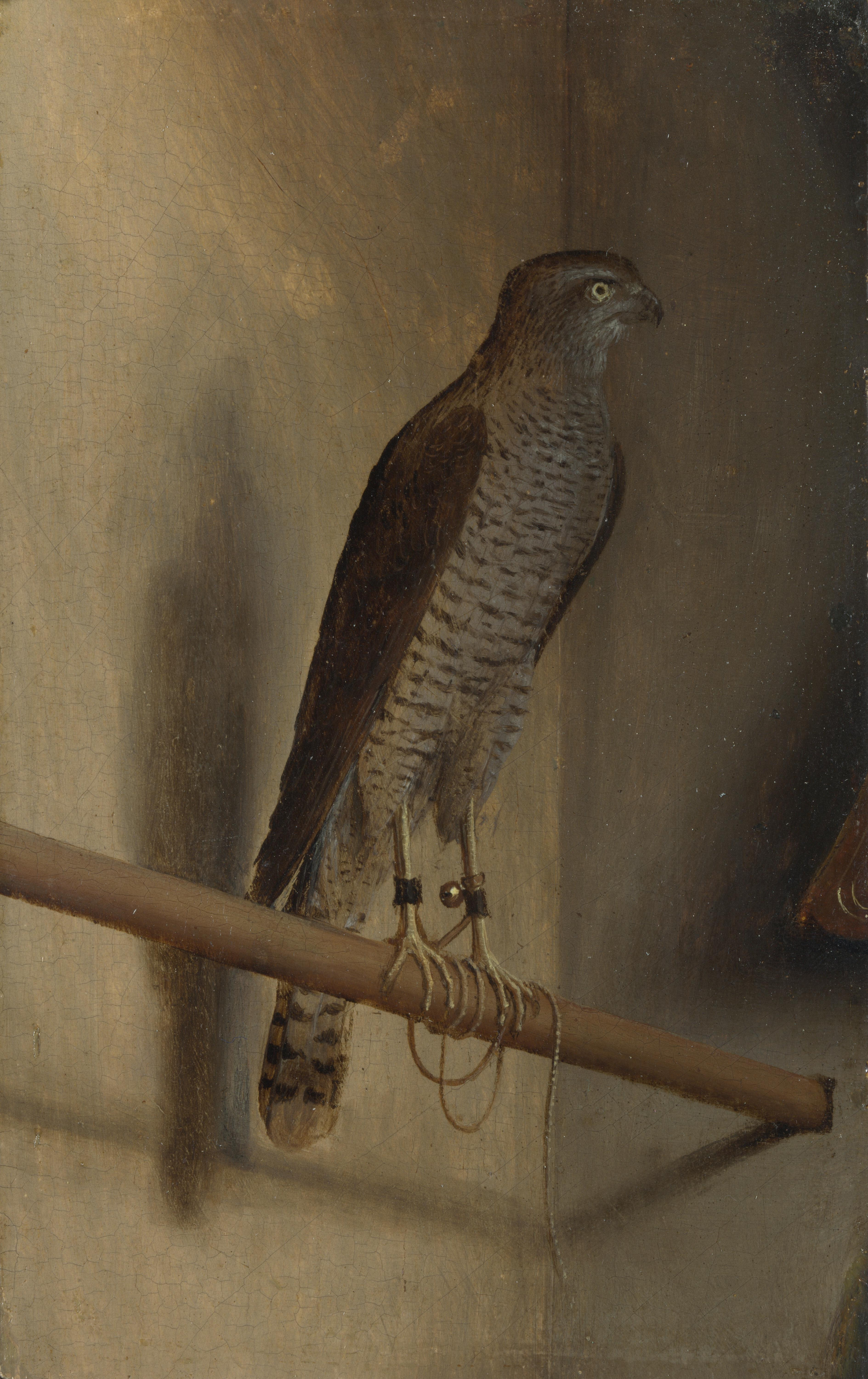
A Sparrowhawk (1510s, showing a Eurasian sparrowhawk) by de' Barbari

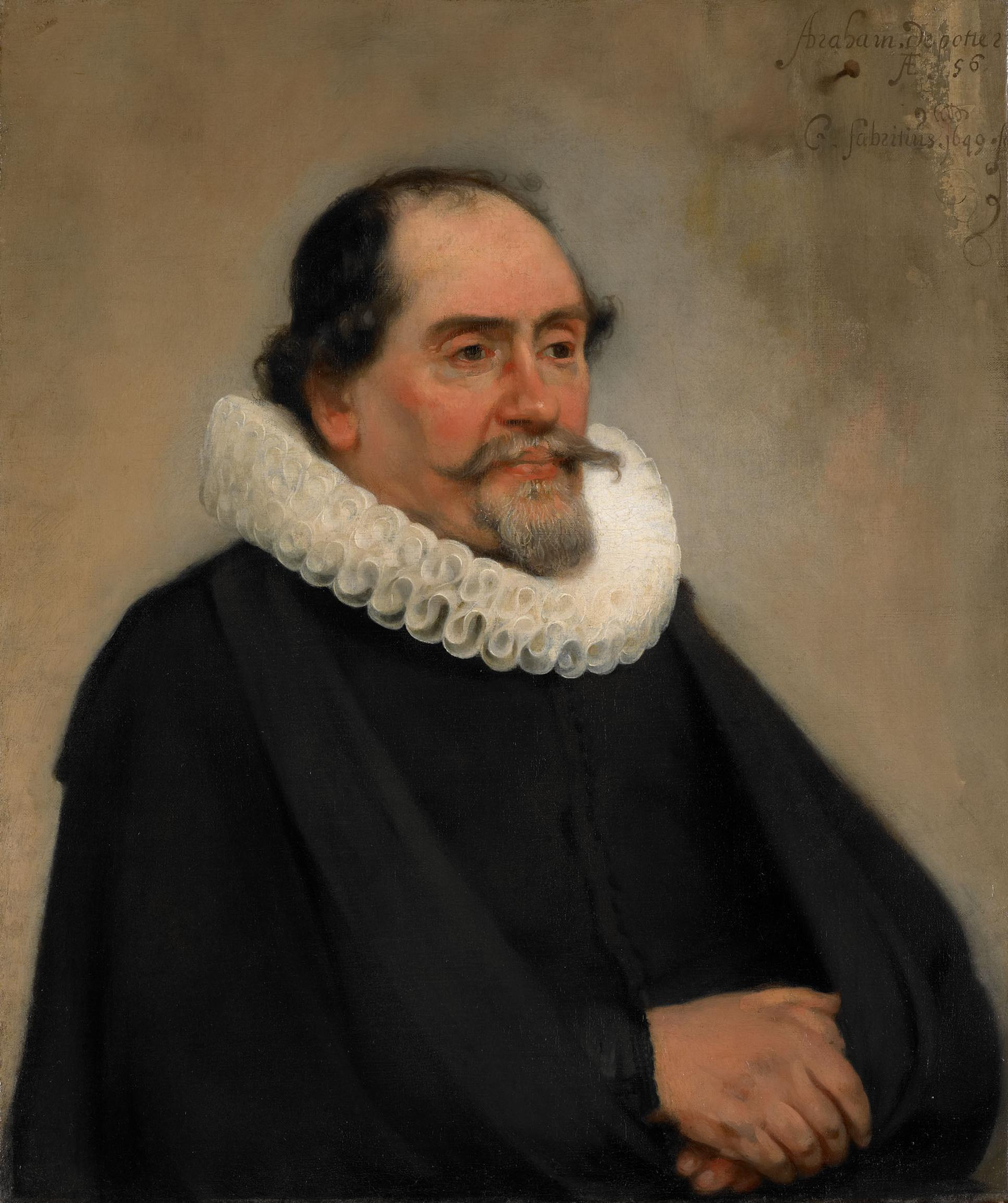
Portrait of Abraham de Potter (1649) by Fabritius

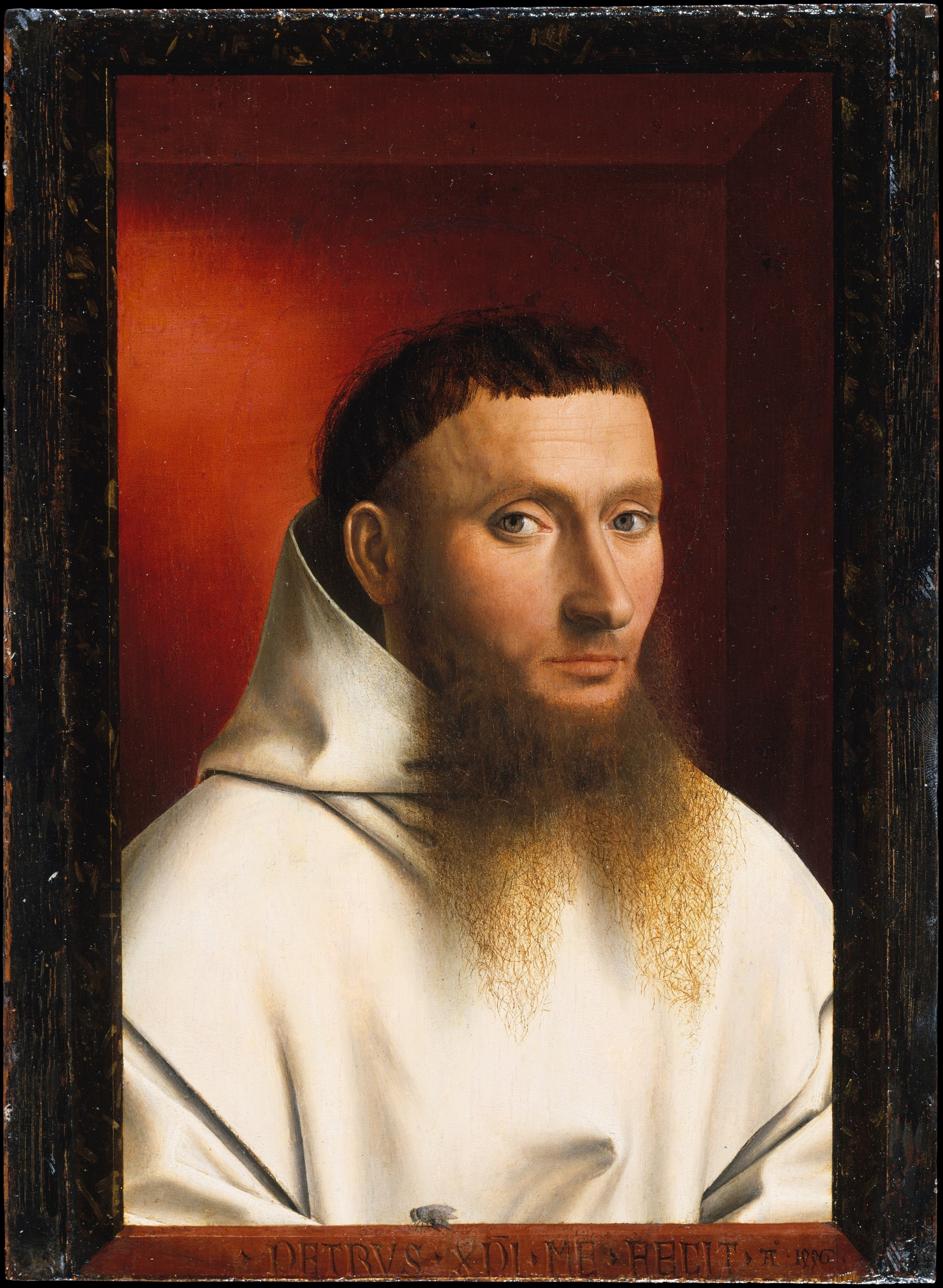
Portrait of a Carthusian by Petrus Christus (1446) with a trompe-l'œil fly apparently on the frame

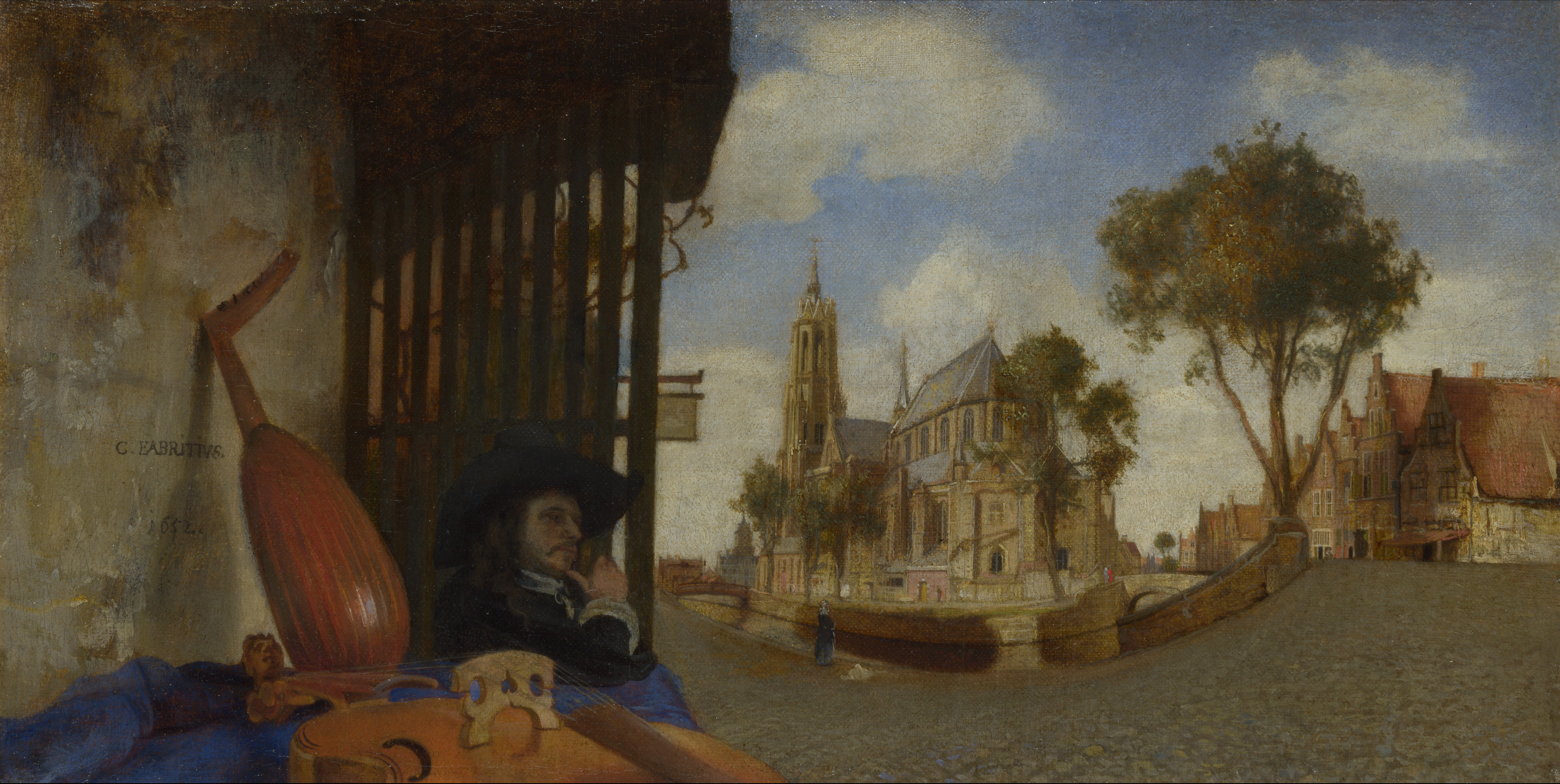
A View of Delft (between 1642 and 1654) by Fabritius

== Artist ==
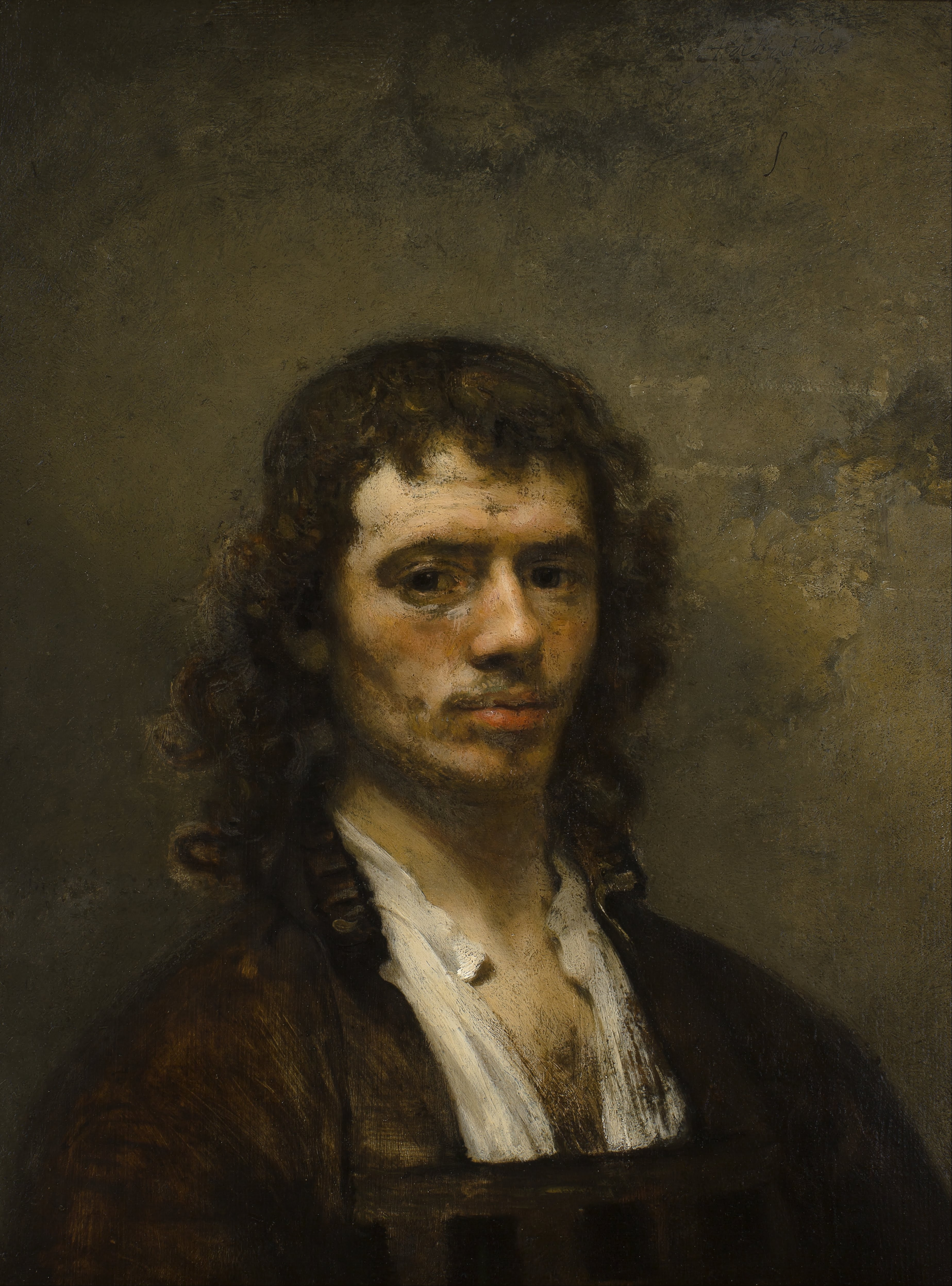
Fabritius's self-portrait, c. 1645

Carel Pietersz Fabritius was born in 1622 in Middenbeemster in the Dutch Republic. Initially he worked as a carpenter. His father and his brothers Barent and Johannes were painters and, although not formally trained in art, Fabritius's ability gained him a place at Rembrandt's studio in Amsterdam. The move to Amsterdam took place in 1641, the same year Fabritius married his first wife, who came from a well-to-do family. Following her death in 1643, he moved back to Middenbeemster, where he lived until the early 1650s, then to Delft, where he joined the Guild of Saint Luke in 1652.

Fabritius died aged 32, caught in the explosion of the Delft gunpowder magazine on October 12, 1654, which killed at least 100 people and destroyed a quarter of the city, including his studio and many of his paintings. Few of his works are known to have survived. According to his biographer Arnold Houbraken, Fabritius's student Mattias Spoors and church deacon Simon Decker also died as a result of the explosion. The Goldfinch was painted in the year Fabritius died.

Fabritius's works were well regarded by his contemporaries, and his style influenced other notable Dutch painters of the period, including Pieter de Hooch, Emanuel de Witte and Johannes Vermeer. Vermeer, who also lived in Delft, in particular used similar pale, worn walls lit by bright sunlight, and it has been suggested that he was Fabritius's student, although there is no real evidence for this claim.

== Provenance ==
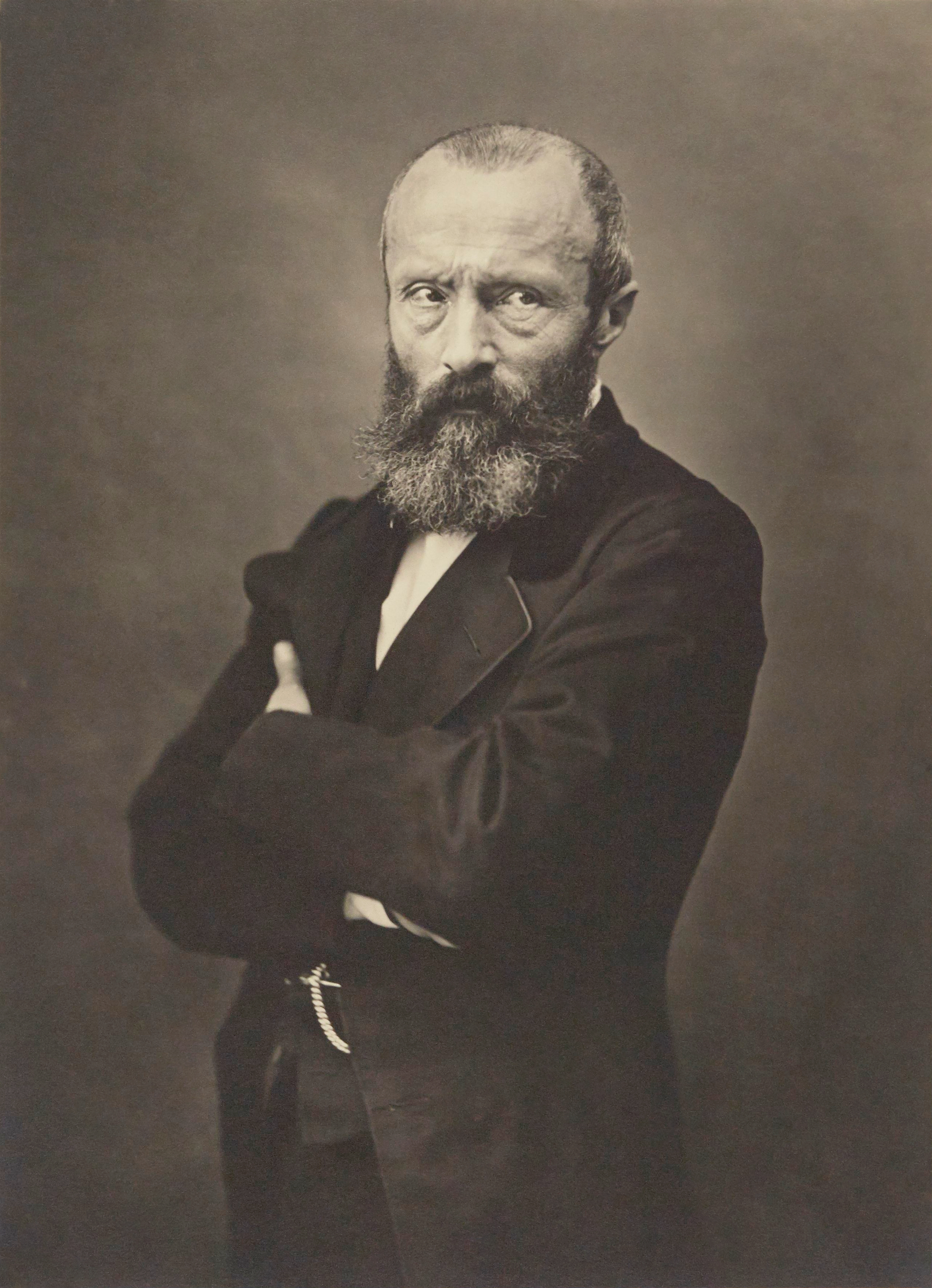
Théophile Thoré-Bürger by Nadar between 1853 and 1869

The Goldfinch was lost and unknown for more than two centuries before it first came to light in 1859. Théophile Thoré-Bürger, who had helped to restore the reputation of Vermeer, found it in Brussels within the collection of former Dutch army officer and collector Chevalier Joseph-Guillaume-Jean Camberlyn. Thoré-Bürger may have temporarily borrowed the painting and cleaned it, and it was eventually given to him by the chevalier's heirs in 1865. Thoré-Bürger in turn bequeathed it with the rest of his collection to his companion, Apolline Lacroix, in 1869, (Note: The former actress Apolline Lacroix was the wife of his colleague Paul Lacroix, the curator of the Bibliothèque de l'Arsenal, and lived with Thoré-Bürger for more than a decade until his death.) three years after its first public exhibition in Paris in 1866.

It was sold to Étienne-François Haro, a painter, restorer and art dealer, for 5,500 francs at the Hôtel Drouot auction house in Paris on 5 December 1892, and later purchased for the Mauritshuis by its curator and art collector Abraham Bredius for 6,200 francs at the sale of the Émile Martinet collection, also at Hôtel Drouot, on 27 February 1896. (Note: Bredius purchased it through an art dealer, Franz Kleinberger: "I let Kleinburger bid at the auction ... the gentleman turned around and said, 'now I would really like to know who the buyer is!' 'C'est moi' was the answer." (Ik liet Kleinburger op de veiling bieden ... de heer zich om, en zegt: "nu zou ik well eens willen weten, wie de kooper is!" "C'est moi", luidde het antwoord.) As well as The Goldfinch, Martinet's collection included works attributed to other renowned artists such as Rembrandt, Francisco Goya, Jan Steen, and Jean-Baptiste-Camille Corot, and La Pythonisse, a work tentatively attributed to Fabritius's brother, Barent.

The painting is now in the collection of the Mauritshuis in The Hague. Its popularity was enhanced by a professional photograph of the work by Vinkenbos (Note: meaning "finch wood") and Dewald, and an etching by Philip Zilcken, both created in its year of purchase.

== Cultural references and exhibitions ==
The Goldfinch plays a central role in the 2013 eponymous novel by American author Donna Tartt. The novel's protagonist, 13-year-old Theodore "Theo" Decker, survives a terrorist bombing at New York's Metropolitan Museum of Art in which his mother dies. He takes the Fabritius painting, part of a Dutch Golden Age exhibition, with him as he escapes the building, and much of the rest of the book is based around his attempts to hide the picture. The book won the 2014 Pulitzer Prize for Fiction, and was a commercial success with sales reaching nearly 1.5 million soon after the award. The book's cover is itself a trompe l'oeil, the painting visible through an illusionary tear in the paper. In reality, the painting has never been displayed in the Metropolitan Museum, although coincidentally an exhibition including The Goldfinch opened at New York's Frick Collection on the day of the novel's publication. An estimated 200,000–235,000 people attended the Frick exhibition, despite freezing temperatures, and 13,000 people joined the museum, quadrupling its subscription base.

Girl with a Pearl Earring by Johannes Vermeer (c. 1665) was part of the 2013–2014 world tour of the Mauritshuis paintings.

The 2013–2014 Frick exhibition was part of a world tour of selected Golden Age paintings from the Mauritshuis during its two-year closure for a £25 million renovation of the gallery, with previous showings in Tokyo, Kobe, San Francisco, Atlanta and New York, and finishing with a visit to Bologna. The Tokyo exhibition was attended by a million people, making it the most visited such event of the year. Prior to the publicity from the release of Tartt's novel, Vermeer's Girl with a Pearl Earring had typically been highlighted as the main attraction of the exhibition.

Tartt's book was adapted as a 2019 film produced by Warner Bros and Amazon Studios, directed by John Crowley, and starring Ansel Elgort and Nicole Kidman. Other cultural references to The Goldfinch include the American artist Helen Frankenthaler's 1960 abstract expressionist interpretation of the 1654 painting titled the Fabritius Bird, and the American poet Morri Creech's 2010 poem "Goldfinch", which includes the line "You stare / from a modest trompe l'oeil heaven we don't share".

The Goldfinch was one of eight Mauritshuis masterpieces depicted on a set of €1.00 stamps issued in 2014 by the Dutch postal service, PostNL, to mark the reopening of the museum. It also featured in a 2004 set of stamps showing works by Fabritius.

The Mauritshuis ran an exhibition from 12 February to 7 June 2026 titled BIRDS – Curated by The Goldfinch & Simon Schama; Sir Simon Schama is an English professor, art historian and author of Birds: The Goldfinch, Birds, Art, and Us, co-edited with Martine Gosselink, the General Director of the Mauritshuis. In addition to The Goldfinch, the exhibition also included works by Leonardo da Vinci, Rembrandt, Pablo Picasso, Henri Matisse, Tracey Emin, Albrecht Dürer and Vincent Van Gogh. Visitors to the exhibition were each given a packet of "Puttermix" organic flower seeds to help create habitat for birds and insects.

The exhibition was reviewed in The Observer by Laura Cumming, its art critic and author of Thunderclap, which included the Delft explosion and the works of Fabritius and other Dutch Golden Age artists. She finished her comments with The beauty of Fabritius's masterpiece is in exact tension with its poignancy: the enigmatic bird, so gentle and solitary, with its flash of golden wing, its alert eye and yearning body, perhaps still full of hope, held here before you as a fellow being, captive, no longer on the wing. It is the greatest painting of a bird in all art.
