= Sallebray =

17th century French poet and playwright

Monsieur (de) Sallebray (or Salbray, whose first name is unknown) was a 17th-century French poet and playwright.

He may have been a bedroom valet of King Louis XIV and published five theatre plays and some poems.

== Works ==
- ~ 1635: Description de la belle chapelle de la maison royale de Fontainebleau, ode.
- 1639: Le Jugement de Pâris et le ravissement d'Hélène, tragicomedy (text on Gallica)
- 1640: La Troade, tragedy (text on Gallica)
- 1642: L'Amante ennemie, tragicomedy (text on Gallica)
- 1642: La Belle Égyptienne, tragicomedy (text on Gallica)
- 1639: L'Enfer divertissant, comedy
- 1660: Épigramme du songe du resveur

== Quote ==
In his catalogue of the Bibliothèque dramatique de Monsieur de Soleinne (n° 1177), Paul Lacroix writes: "There's something of Corneille in this author, to whom Corneille sometimes borrows thoughts and verse. This response by Andromaque to Ulysse (La Troade) is sublime: Threat me to live and not to die.

== See also ==
- 17th-century French literature
