= The Goldfinch (film) =

2019 film by John Crowley

- Theatrical release poster
- Directed by: John Crowley
- Screenplay by: Peter Straughan
- Based on: The Goldfinch by Donna Tartt
- Produced by: Nina Jacobson; Brad Simpson
- Starring: Ansel Elgort; Oakes Fegley; Aneurin Barnard; Finn Wolfhard; Sarah Paulson; Luke Wilson; Jeffrey Wright; Nicole Kidman
- Cinematography: Roger Deakins
- Edited by: Kelley Dixon
- Music by: Trevor Gureckis
- Production companies: Amazon Studios; Color Force
- Distributed by: Warner Bros. Pictures
- Release dates: September 8, 2019 (TIFF); September 13, 2019 (United States)
- Running time: 149 minutes
- Country: United States
- Language: English
- Budget: $44–49 million
- Box office: $10 million

The Goldfinch is a 2019 American drama film directed by John Crowley. It was written by Peter Straughan, who adapted the 2013 novel The Goldfinch by Donna Tartt. It stars Ansel Elgort as Theodore Decker, whose life changes after his mother dies in a terrorist bombing at a museum and a dying man convinces him to take a famous painting called The Goldfinch from the museum. Oakes Fegley, Aneurin Barnard, Finn Wolfhard, Sarah Paulson, Luke Wilson, Jeffrey Wright, and Nicole Kidman appear in supporting roles.

The novel's film rights were sold to Warner Bros. and RatPac Entertainment in July 2014, with ICM Partners brokering the deal. Two years later, Crowley was hired to direct the film adaptation, and Elgort was selected to portray the lead role. Most of the remaining cast joined from October 2017 to January 2018. Filming began in New York City in January 2018 and moved to Albuquerque in April 2018 for the rest of the production.

The Goldfinch premiered at the 2019 Toronto International Film Festival and was theatrically released in the United States on September 23, 2019, by Warner Bros. Pictures. The film was a box-office bomb, grossing $10 million against a production budget between $44–49 million, with estimated losses for the studio as high as $50 million. It received generally negative reviews that criticised the plot and narrative, though the cinematography and performances received praise. Tartt reportedly hated the adaptation to the point of firing her longtime agent over it.

== Plot ==
Thirteen-year-old Theodore Decker's mother is killed in a bombing at the Metropolitan Museum of Art in New York City. In the aftermath of the explosion, a dying man urges him to take a painting—The Goldfinch—and his engraved ring. Theo is placed into foster care with the Barbours, the family of his best friend Andy. Theo becomes close to Mrs. Barbour, who encourages his interest in antiques and art.

It is revealed that Theo and his mother were supposed to see Theo's school principal that day because the school said he and classmate Tom Cable had been smoking cigarettes. They were early, so his mother took Theo to the museum on the day of the explosion. Theo blames himself for his mother's death.

Theo locates the antiques shop of James "Hobie" Hobart, whose partner Welton "Welty" Blackwell (the dying man from the museum) gave the ring to Theo to return. Hobie allows Theo to visit Pippa, Welty's niece who was injured in the bombing, and the children bond before Pippa is sent to live with her aunt in Texas. Andy hints that his parents are considering adopting Theo. However, Theo's estranged father Larry, claiming to be newly sober, arrives with his girlfriend Xandra to relocate Theo to Las Vegas. Theo brings The Goldfinch and keeps it hidden.

In Las Vegas, Theo befriends Boris, a Ukrainian classmate who introduces him to drugs and alcohol. Larry ends up in gambling debt and tries to have Theo transfer his education fund to a banking account but ultimately fails.

After Theo and Boris take LSD, Theo learns that Larry was killed in a drunk-driving crash. When Xandra berates him for his apparently apathetic response to his father's death, Theo runs away to New York, taking Xandra's dog Popper and the painting. Theo tries to convince Boris to come with him, but Boris kisses him and runs away. Hobie allows Theo to live with him.

Eight years later, Theo has made Hobie's shop successful, selling his restored antiques. He runs into Andy's older brother Platt, who reveals that Andy and their father were killed in a boating accident. Theo visits the ailing Mrs. Barbour and reconnects with her daughter Kitsey. Reeve, a disgruntled art dealer, confronts Theo for selling him a fake. Having deduced that Theo stole The Goldfinch, Reeve accuses him of using it as collateral to finance his shop. Unbeknownst to anyone else, Theo keeps the wrapped painting in a storage locker.

Theo becomes engaged to Andy's younger sister Kitsey, but harbors a secret love for Pippa, who now lives in London with her boyfriend Everett. Theo catches Kitsey cheating on him with Tom Cable, but they remain engaged, as Theo is close to Mrs. Barbour and Kitsey is permissive toward his drug habit. Theo tells Hobie the truth about selling his restorations as "real" forgeries. Pippa visits Theo and they confess their feelings for each other, but she tearfully rejects him, citing the instability caused by their shared childhood trauma.

Seeking drugs at a bar, Theo is reunited with Boris, who reveals he had stolen The Goldfinch from Theo years prior and had used it as collateral to finance his criminal career, before it was then in turn stolen from him. After a visit from Reeve, a heartbroken Hobie confronts Theo over the theft and loss of The Goldfinch.

At Theo's and Kitsey's engagement party, Boris arrives with a plan to recover The Goldfinch. Theo accompanies him to Amsterdam, where Boris seizes the painting at gunpoint, but they are ambushed by another pair of criminals. Boris kills one of them but is shot. Theo is forced to kill the other assailant, while another man escapes with the painting.

Theo tries to commit suicide in his hotel room, but is rescued by Boris. Boris explains that he called in a tip to the police about the painting's location, and that during the subsequent raid, the authorities recovered the painting as well as other stolen art, including a Rembrandt. Boris persuades Theo that it was all for the greater good.

== Cast ==
- Ansel Elgort as adult Theo Decker
  - Oakes Fegley as young Theo Decker
- Aneurin Barnard as adult Boris
  - Finn Wolfhard as young Boris
- Ashleigh Cummings as adult Pippa
  - Aimee Laurence as young Pippa
- Willa Fitzgerald as adult Kitsey Barbour
- Sarah Paulson as Xandra
- Luke Wilson as Larry
- Jeffrey Wright as Hobie
- Nicole Kidman as Mrs. Barbour
- Denis O'Hare as Lucius Reeve
- Boyd Gaines as Mr. Barbour
- Peter Jacobson as Mr. Silver
- Robert Joy as Welty
- Luke Kleintank as Platt Barbour
- Hailey Wist as Theo's mother

== Production ==
In July 2014, film rights to the novel were sold to Warner Bros. Pictures and RatPac Entertainment with ICM Partners brokering the deal. Two years later, John Crowley was hired to direct the film adaptation. In August 2017, Warner Bros. finalized a deal with Amazon Studios to co-finance the adaptation, where Amazon would invest in more than a third of the project's budget and obtain streaming rights to the picture on its Prime Video service, while Warner Bros. would distribute the film in theaters worldwide.

On October 4, 2017, after a two-month casting search, Ansel Elgort was cast in the lead role of Theodore "Theo" Decker, following his breakout turn in Baby Driver. On the same day, cinematographer Roger Deakins revealed to Variety that The Goldfinch was his next project after Blade Runner 2049. Later that month, in light of his recent performance in Dunkirk, Aneurin Barnard was cast as Boris. On November 15, Sarah Paulson was cast as Xandra. In early November 2017, Kelley Dixon from Breaking Bad and Better Call Saul was enlisted to be the film's editor. By late November, Trevor Gureckis was hired as the film's composer. In December 2017, Willa Fitzgerald and Ashleigh Cummings joined the cast. In January 2018, Jeffrey Wright, Luke Wilson, Finn Wolfhard, and Luke Kleintank joined the cast. Later that month, the rest of the cast was announced as principal production commenced.

Principal photography began in New York on January 23, 2018, before moving to Albuquerque on April 3, 2018, for the rest of production.

== Marketing and release ==
Footage from the film was first shown at CinemaCon on April 2, 2019. The first official images were released on May 19, 2019, as well as the first official teaser poster of the film. The first official trailer was released on May 20, 2019. About six months prior to its release, following test screenings, Warner Bros. knew the film would possibly perform poorly and in turn "dramatically" trimmed their prospective marketing plan.

The Goldfinch premiered at the Toronto International Film Festival on September 8, 2019. It was released in cinemas the United States on September 13, 2019, after previously being set for October 11.

== Reception ==
=== Box office ===
The Goldfinch grossed $5.3 million in the United States and Canada, and $4.1 million in other territories, for a worldwide total of $9.4 million, against a production budget of $44–49 million.

In the United States and Canada, the film was released alongside Hustlers and was originally projected to gross $5–8 million from 2,542 cinemas in its opening weekend. However, after making just $870,000 on its first day, estimates were lowered to below $3 million. It went on to debut to just $2.6 million, the sixth worst-saturated opening of all time for a film playing on over 2,500 screens. Following its poor opening, many publications had already labeled the film a box-office bomb and estimated it would lose as much as $50 million ($25–30 million for Warner Bros. and $16–18 million for Amazon Studios). The film plunged 71% in its second weekend to $770,000.

=== Critical response ===
On review aggregator website Rotten Tomatoes, the film holds an approval rating of 24% based on 227 reviews with an average rating of 4.6/10. The site's critical consensus reads, "Beautifully filmed yet mostly inert, The Goldfinch mishandles its source material, flattening a complex narrative into a largely uninvolving disappointment." On Metacritic, the film has a weighted average score of 40 out of 100, based on 41 critics, indicating "mixed or average reviews". Audiences polled by CinemaScore gave the film an average grade of "B" on an A+ to F scale.

A.O. Scott, writing for the New York Times, said the film "looks and sounds like a movie without quite being one. It's more like a Pinterest page or a piece of fan art, the record of an enthusiasm that is, to the outside observer, indistinguishable from confusion." Peter Travers of Rolling Stone called it "a botch job for the ages" and said it "appears to be adapting the Cliff's Notes version of the book instead of the book itself, producing an unplayable series of scene snippets".

=== Author's response ===
While author Donna Tartt was paid $3 million for the rights to her novel, she disowned the film for not being given the chance to write the screenplay or be named as a producer. As a result, she fired her agent of more than 30 years, Amanda "Binky" Urban.
