= Dufour =

Dufour or variant, may refer to:

- Dufour (surname)

== Places ==
- Dufourspitze or Dufour's peak, in the Swiss Alps
- Julia Dufour, a village and municipality in Santa Cruz Province, Argentina

== Other uses ==
- 1961 Dufour, main-belt asteroid
- Dufour Auditorium, a concert hall in Saguenay, Quebec, Canada
- Dufour Yachts, French sailboat manufacturer
- Dufour's gland, an abdominal gland of certain insects
- Dufour effect, the energy flux due to a mass concentration gradient

== See also ==
- Dufour-Lapointe, a surname
- Four (disambiguation)
- Joseph Dufour et Cie, French wallpaper and fabrics manufacturer
- DE 4, Delaware Route 4
- (23466) 1990 DU4, asteroid
- DU-4, an acupuncture point
