= A Sparrowhawk =

Painting by Jacopo de' Barbari

- Uno sparviero (Italian)
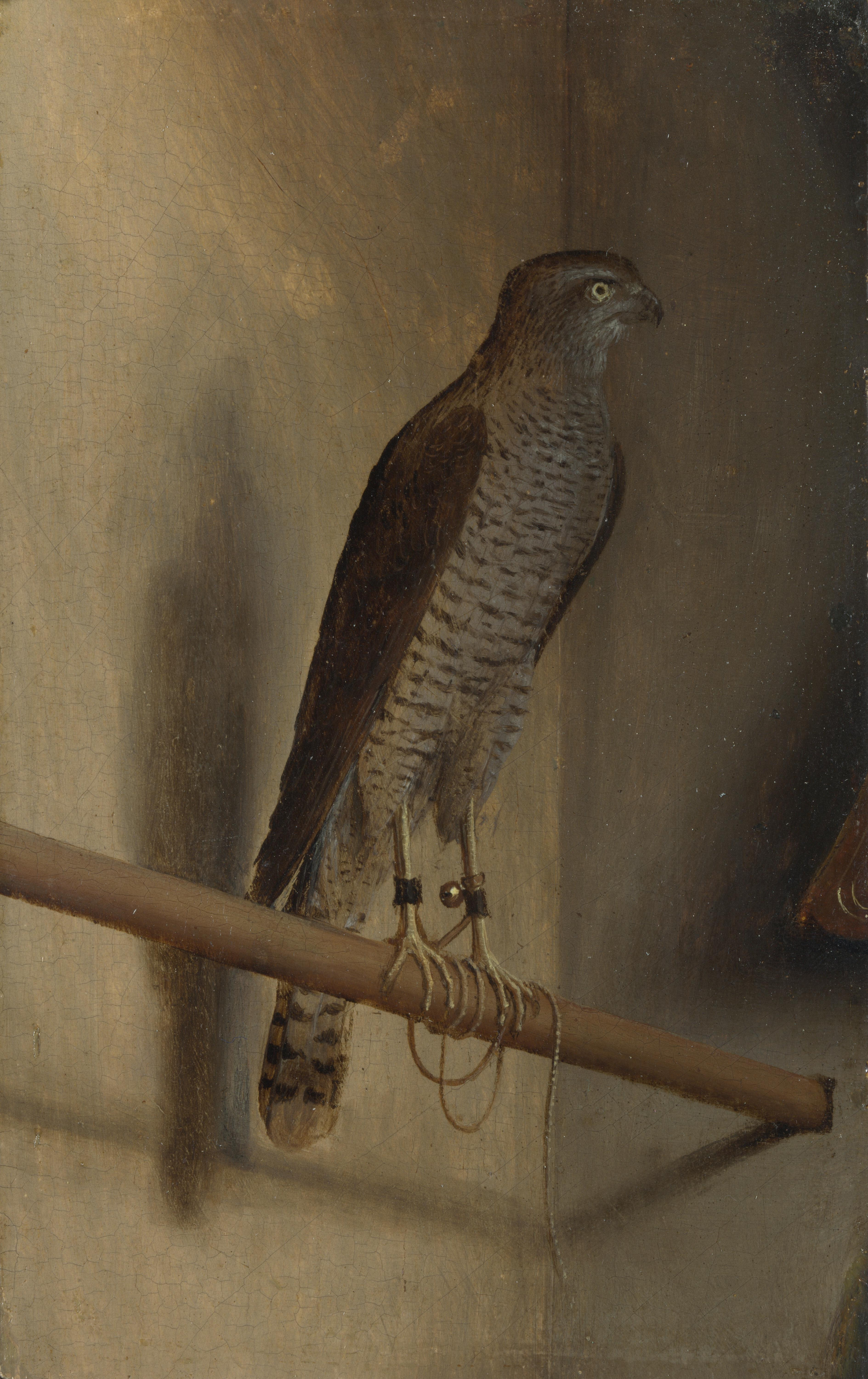
- Artist: Jacopo de' Barbari
- Year: 1510s
- Medium: Oil on oak panel
- Movement: Renaissance
- Subject: Sparrowhawk
- Dimensions: 17.8 cm × 10.8 cm (7.0 in × 4.3 in)
- Location: National Gallery, London
- Accession: 1916 (Layard Bequest)

A Sparrowhawk (Italian: Uno sparviero) is a painting by Venetian artist Jacopo de' Barbari, probably made late in the 1510s, while he was working in the Netherlands towards the end of his life.

Painted in oils on an oak panel, it measures 17.8 cm × 10.8 cm (7.0 in × 4.3 in). It depicts a female sparrowhawk, perched on a wooden rail near the corner of a room, with shadows thrown onto the plain plastered wall behind. The grey-winged bird of prey has jesses with a bell attached to its legs. It may be a fragment of a larger work, now lost. It has been considered as an early example of a trompe-l'œil painting, using perspective and shadows to give the impression of a real bird occupying space, similar to The Goldfinch of Carel Fabritius.

It was acquired by the National Gallery, London in 1916, as part of the Layard Bequest.
