= Lapointe (surname) =

Lapointe or LaPoint or Lepoint or LePoint is a surname. Notable people with this surname include;

== Lapointe ==
=== Singers or artists from Quebec, Canada ===
- Éric Lapointe (singer) (born 1969), musician
- Jean Lapointe (1935–2022), actor, comedian, singer, and politician
- Pierre Lapointe (born 1981), singer-songwriter
- Stéphanie Lapointe (born 1984), singer, songwriter, and actress
- Suzanne Lapointe (1934–2015), singer and actress

=== Politicians from Quebec, Canada ===
- Charles Lapointe (born 1944), businessman and politician
- Ernest Lapointe (1876–1941), lawyer and politician
- François Lapointe (politician) (born 1971), politician
- Linda Lapointe (born 1960), businesswoman and politician
- Lisette Lapointe (born 1943), politician, journalist, and teacher
- Renaude Lapointe (1912–2002), journalist and politician

=== Other people named Lapointe ===
- Boby Lapointe (1922–1972), French singer
- Claude Lapointe (born 1968), NHL player for the New York Islanders
- Éric Lapointe (Canadian football) (born 1974), Canadian football player for the Montreal Alouettes
- Francis C. Lapointe (1939–2025), American politician from Massachusetts
- François Lapointe (racewalker) (born 1961), Canadian racewalker
- Guy Lapointe (born 1948), NHL player for the Montreal Canadiens
- Markenzy Lapointe (born 1968), United States attorney for the Southern District of Florida
- Martin Lapointe (born 1973), NHL hockey player for the Ottawa Senators
- Ralph LaPointe (1922–1967), American baseball player
- Rick Lapointe (1955–1999), NHL player
- Ron Lapointe (1949–1992), professional ice hockey coach, Quebec Nordiques 1987–1989
- Ron LaPointe (American football), American football player, 1980–1981

== LaPoint ==
- Bob LaPoint (born 1955), American water skier
- Dave LaPoint (born 1959), American baseball pitcher
- Kris LaPoint (born 1953), American water skier

== Lepoint ==
- Christophe Lepoint (born 1984), Belgian soccer player

== LePoint ==
- Olympia LePoint (born 1976), American author

== See also ==
- Dufour-Lapointe, a surname
- Lapointe (disambiguation)
