= Apolline Lacroix =

French actress

Apolline Lacroix (née Biffe; 1805–1896) was a French actress who married Paul Lacroix, the curator of the Bibliothèque de l'Arsenal in Paris, on May 7, 1834. She also lived with Paul Lacroix's collaborator, art collector Théophile Thoré-Bürger, for more than a decade. Their affair only ended with his death in 1869.

On Thoré-Bürger's death, she inherited his valuable art collection, which included paintings by Vermeer and The Goldfinch by Carel Fabritius that Thoré-Bürger had found in Brussels 200 years after its creation. Subsequently, much of the collection was sold off.
