= Portrait of Abraham de Potter =

Painting by Carel Fabritius

- Portret van Abraham de Potter (Dutch)
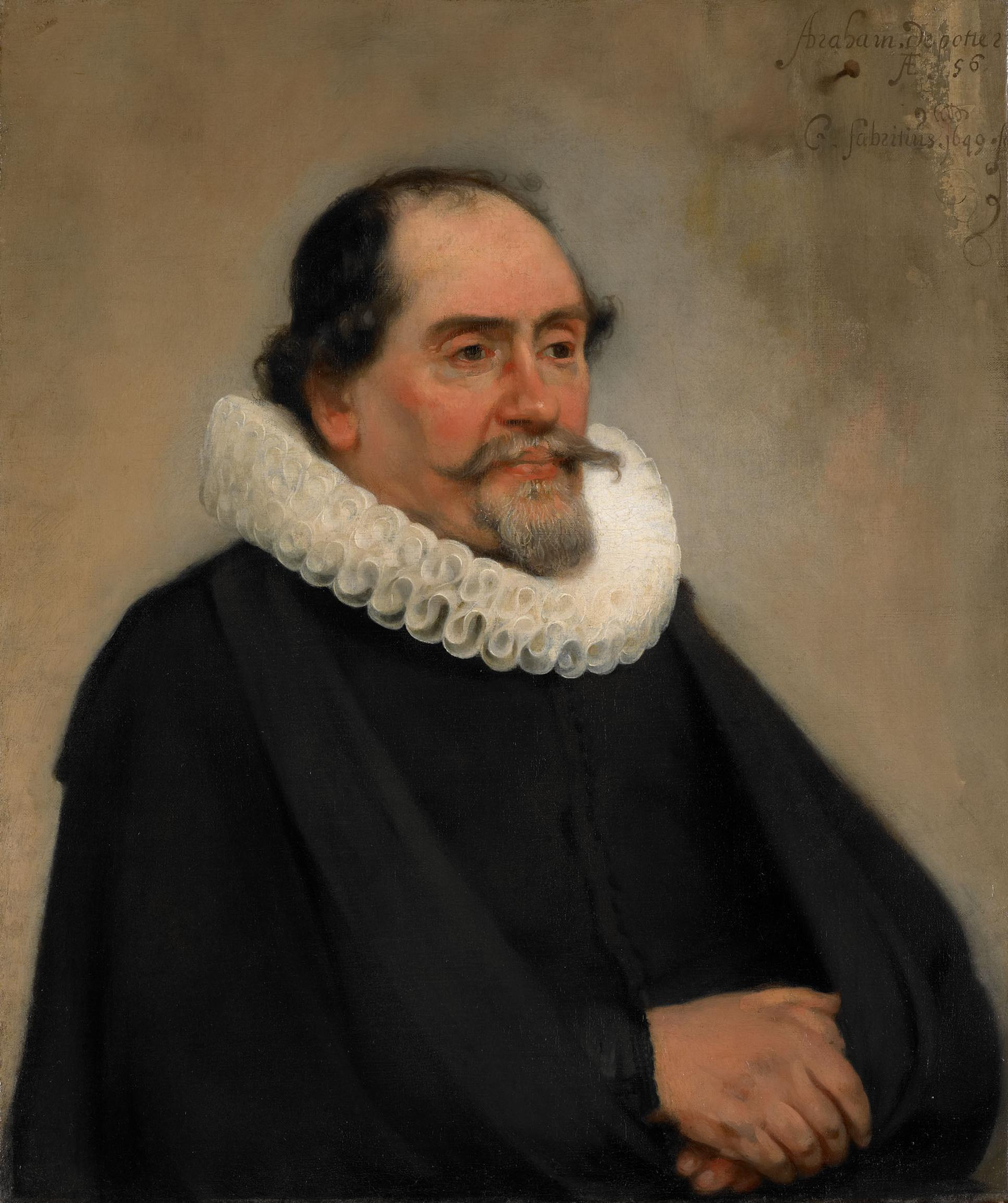
- Artist: Carel Fabritius
- Year: 1649
- Type: Portrait painting
- Medium: Oil on canvas
- Subject: Abraham de Potter
- Dimensions: 68.5 cm × 57 cm (27.0 in × 22 in)
- Location: Rijksmuseum, Amsterdam, Netherlands

Portrait of Abraham de Potter, Amsterdam Silk Merchant (Dutch: Portret van Abraham de Potter, zijdelakenkoopman in Amsterdam) is a 1649 portrait painting of silk merchant Abraham de Potter by the Dutch painter Carel Fabritius. The oil painting on canvas is 68.5 by 57 cm (27.0 by 22 in). The work has been in the collection of the Rijksmuseum in Amsterdam since 1892.

== History ==
Fabritius made this painting a year before moving to Delft. This portrait and the Self-portrait in the Museum Boijmans Van Beuningen, in Rotterdam, are the only works that have survived from the short period between his collaboration with Rembrandt in Amsterdam and his departure to Delft. At that time he was living again in his native village of Middenbeemster. 17th-century documents show that at this time he also carried out assignments for wealthy Amsterdam families who had country houses in the Beemster. He may have come into contact with these families thanks to the relationships of the person portrayed in this painting, Abraham de Potter, who was a family friend and fellow Calvinist believer of Fabritius' parents. For example, he and his wife Sara Sauchelle acted as godparents at the baptism of Carel's younger brother Johannes Fabritius. Because De Potter's name was sometimes also spelled Puttertje ("Goldfinch"), Fabritius biographer Christopher Brown has cautiously suggested the possibility that Fabritius painted his famous painting The Goldfinch for him.

== Analysis ==
The portrait illustrates the new path that Fabritius took after his intensive collaboration with Rembrandt. Although he remains faithful to his master in his loose painting technique through which the underlayer shines, he exchanges the dramatic light-dark contrasts of his early history paintings for a clear, naturalistic lighting full of refined color nuances. This may be related to his growing interest in the trompe-l'oeil, of which the painted nail at the top right of the whitewashed wall is the earliest known example in Fabritius's work.

== Provenance ==
The painting comes from the collection of William Ward, 1st Earl of Dudley, previously styled Lord Ward (1817–1885). At the auction of his estate on 25 June 1892 in London, it was bought by art dealer Martin Henry Colnaghi who sold the portrait to the Rijksmuseum in Amsterdam in the same year.
