= Lisette Dufour =

Canadian voice actress

Lisette Dufour (born 2 April 1949) is a Québécoise voice actress who is better known as the French-Canadian voice of Lisa Simpson on The Simpsons.

She also did a number of French dubbings, including most notably Pocahontas in the Disney movie and Anastasia in the Fox movie.
