= The Goldfinch (novel) =

2013 novel by Donna Tartt

- First edition
- Author: Donna Tartt
- Cover artist: The painting used on the cover is The Goldfinch (1654) by Carel Fabritius
- Language: English
- Genre: Literary fiction
- Published: September 23, 2013
- Publisher: Little, Brown and Company
- Publication place: United States
- Media type: Print, e-book, audiobook
- Pages: 771
- ISBN: 9781408704950

The Goldfinch is a novel by the American author Donna Tartt. It won the 2014 Pulitzer Prize for Fiction.

The Goldfinch follows 13-year-old Theodore Decker, and the dramatic changes his life undergoes after he survives a terrorist attack at the Metropolitan Museum of Art that kills his mother and results in his coming into possession of Carel Fabritius's painting The Goldfinch.

== Background ==
Tartt has stated that she had been wanting to write about Amsterdam for 20 years, having lived for some time in the city after the success of The Little Friend.

She was partly inspired to write The Goldfinch after hearing about the Taliban's destruction in 2001 of the historic statues of Buddha in Bamiyan, Afghanistan. She says: "There was nothing to write about, there was not really a story – but there was an idea that something so beautiful, a light at the heart of the world, could be just taken away, destroyed, deliberately."

As a child, she used to make little books written around images taken from magazines; one of these featured a painting, a portrait of the Infanta by Velasquez. She says in interview: "With The Goldfinch, in some ways, I'm going back to those earliest construction-paper books and the childhood technique of choosing a picture and writing a story around it."

In the novel, Theo, having lost his mother to a terrorist attack, finds himself in possession of a small Dutch Golden Age painting called Het Puttertje (The Goldfinch). The painting is one of the few surviving works by Rembrandt's most promising pupil, Carel Fabritius (almost all of Fabritius's works were destroyed in the Delft explosion of 1654, in which the artist himself was killed). By an extraordinary coincidence, the Goldfinch painting, which is rarely exhibited outside of its country of origin, was shown in New York for a show at the Frick, opening on the very day The Goldfinch was published.

== Plot ==
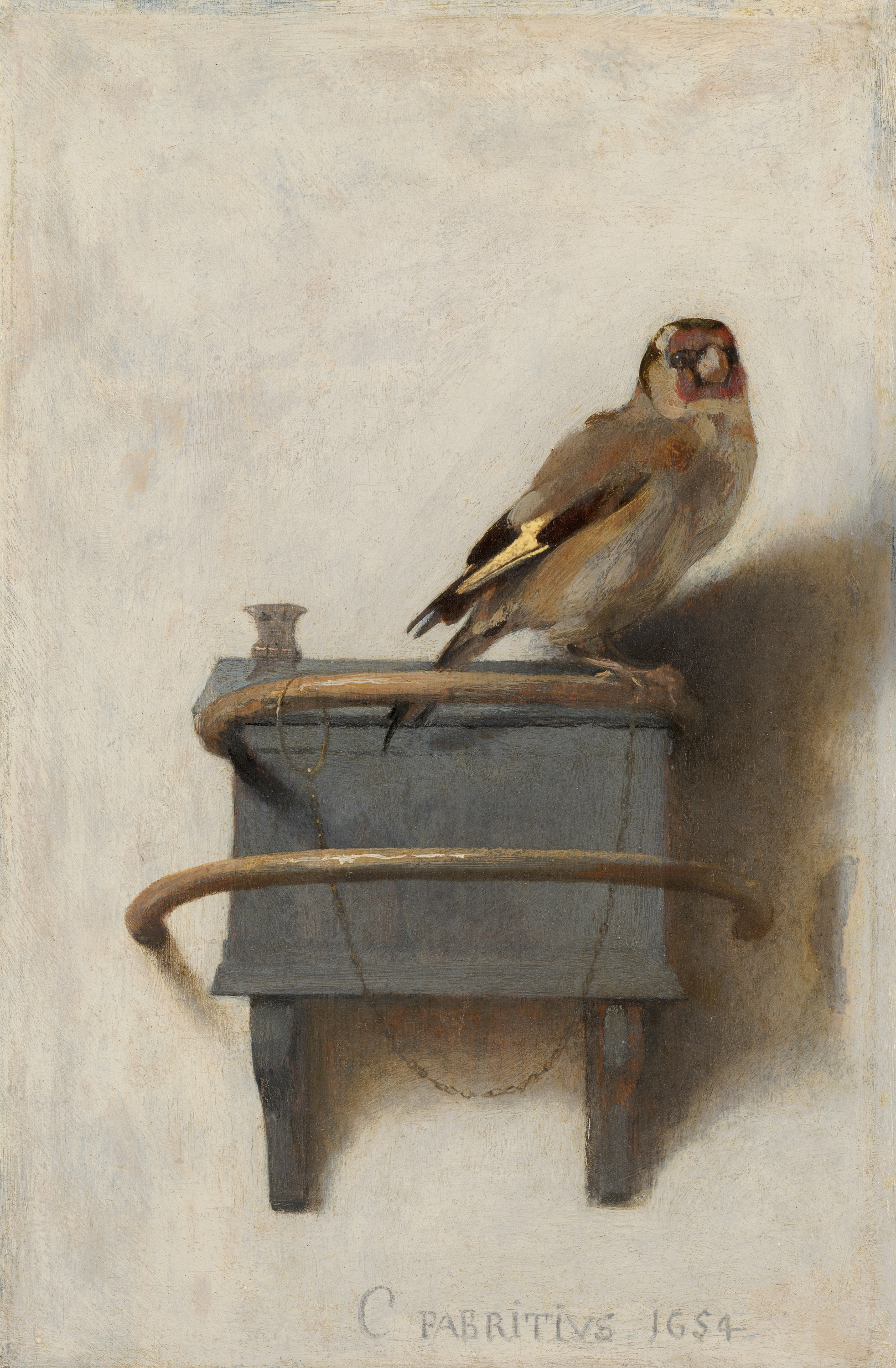
The titular painting, The Goldfinch (1654), by Carel Fabritius

The Goldfinch is told in retrospective first-person narration by Theodore "Theo" Decker. Thirteen-year-old Theo's life is turned upside down when he and his mother visit the Metropolitan Museum of Art to see an exhibition of Dutch masterpieces, including a favorite painting of hers, Carel Fabritius's The Goldfinch. There, he becomes intrigued by a red-headed girl in the company of an elderly man. A bomb explodes in the museum, killing his mother and several other visitors.

In the rubble, Theo once more encounters the old man, who gives him a ring and delivers an enigmatic message before dying. Believing that the man is indicating The Goldfinch, Theo takes it during his panicked escape. He moves in with a school friend, Andy Barbour, and his wealthy family in their Park Avenue apartment. He carries out the old man's last wishes and returns the ring to his business partner, James "Hobie" Hobart. Theo learns that the old man's name was Welton "Welty" Blackwell, and that he and Hobie ran an antiques shop together. He becomes friends with Hobie and encounters the red-haired girl, Pippa, who lived with Welty and Hobie after her mother (Welty's half-sister) died of cancer.

Theo's life is further disrupted when his deadbeat father arrives with his new girlfriend, Xandra, and whisks him away to Las Vegas. Theo takes the painting with him, but avoids taking it out of hiding or looking at it. In Las Vegas, he makes a new friend, Boris Pavlikovsky, the cosmopolitan son of a Ukrainian émigré, who is similarly neglected. The two boys develop an intense friendship and spend most of their afternoons drinking, smoking marijuana, and using other illegal drugs. According to Boris, Theo has drunken blackouts during which he forgets everything, although Theo denies this. While hounded by a loan-shark, Theo's father gets drunk and dies in a car crash. Fearful of what his father's death may mean to his living situation, Theo flees to New York via cross-country bus and is welcomed at Hobie's. Pippa, now enrolled in a school for troubled teens in Switzerland, is visiting on a break; Theo remains enamored with her.

The narrative skips ahead eight years. Theo has become a full partner in Hobart's business. He has continually concealed The Goldfinch, afraid of being accused of theft. He is engaged to Kitsey, Andy's younger sister, but is still confused and obsessed with Pippa, who is living in London with her boyfriend. Over the years, he becomes addicted to prescription medication, and saves Hobie from bankruptcy by selling fake antiques.

One day, Boris reappears, now a wealthy man thanks to dubious unspecified activities. To Theo's astonishment, Boris reveals that he stole The Goldfinch from Theo while they were in high school, without Theo ever realizing; the painting has since been used as collateral by criminals and drug dealers. Out of guilt, Boris has devoted himself to recovering the painting and returning it to Theo. At Theo's engagement party, Boris appears with a plan to retrieve The Goldfinch. They fly to Amsterdam to meet with the dealers who have the painting. Boris and his associates steal it back, but the plan goes awry when armed henchmen confront them. In the resulting conflict, Boris is shot in the arm, and Theo kills Boris's attacker while one of the dealers escapes with the painting.

Boris disappears, leaving Theo alone in his hotel in Amsterdam, where he spirals into paranoia and substance abuse. Unable to return to New York because Boris has his passport, he contemplates suicide. After several days, Boris returns and reveals that he has resolved the situation by phoning the art recovery police to inform on the dealers. Not only has the painting been saved for the museum, but Boris has received a huge reward, which he shares with Theo.

After arriving in the United States, Theo travels the country, using the reward money to buy back the fake antiques from customers. He realizes that Pippa loves him, but she did not openly reciprocate his feelings because she believes they both share the same damage and flaws, having both survived the trauma of the museum explosion and resorted to self-medication to cope. In a lengthy reflection, Theo wonders how much of his experiences were unavoidable due to fate or his character, and contemplates The Goldfinch and "the history of people who have loved beautiful things, and looked out for them, and pulled them from the fire". The novel ends on a curious note, as Theo's contemplation demonstrates both a hard fate still ahead and a sort of redeeming immortality through the admiration of beauty.

== Reception ==
Critical reception of the novel was polarized. Kirkus Reviews and Booklist both gave the novel starred reviews. Booklist wrote, "Drenched in sensory detail, infused with Theo's churning thoughts and feelings, sparked by nimble dialogue, and propelled by escalating cosmic angst and thriller action, Tartt's trenchant, defiant, engrossing, and rocketing novel conducts a grand inquiry into the mystery and sorrow of survival, beauty and obsession, and the promise of art."

Stephen King praised the novel and called Tartt "an amazingly good writer". In The New York Times, Michiko Kakutani pointed out what she saw as the novel's Dickensian elements, writing, "Ms. Tartt has made Fabritius's bird the MacGuffin at the center of her glorious, Dickensian novel, a novel that pulls together all her remarkable storytelling talents into a rapturous, symphonic whole and reminds the reader of the immersive, stay-up-all-night pleasures of reading." Woody Brown, writing in Art Voice, described The Goldfinch as a "marvelous, epic tale, one whose 773 beautiful pages say, in short: 'How can we? And yet, we do.'"

In mid-2014, Vanity Fair reported that the book had received "some of the severest pans in memory from the country's most important critics and sparked a full-on debate in which the naysayers believe that nothing less is at stake than the future of reading itself". Both The New Yorker's James Wood and the London Review of Books claimed the book was juvenile in nature, the former arguing that the novel's "tone, language, and story belong in children's literature" while the latter called The Goldfinch a crypto-children’s book. The Sunday Times of London said that "no amount of straining for high-flown uplift can disguise the fact that The Goldfinch is a turkey"; The Paris Review stated, "A book like The Goldfinch doesn't undo any clichés—it deals in them," and The Guardian called it "overlong and tediously Pooteresque."

The novel was 15th in the decade-end list of Paste, with Josh Jackson writing, "'Literary fiction' can sometimes be code for 'lightly plotted,' but every so often a book comes around that is as engagingly told as it is beautifully written. Donna Tartt's The Goldfinch is such a novel." Ema O'Connor strongly criticized the portion in which Theo is outside of New York, but lauded the first hundred pages highly and chose the book as one of the decade's 24 best: "It's a crime novel, an art history thesis, an LGBTQ coming-of-age story, and a meditation on toxic masculinity all wrapped up in 976 pages." Patrick Rapa of The Philadelphia Inquirer listed it as one of the decade's 20 best. Kakutani listed the book as one of the greatest of the 21st century as part of a poll by Vulture, arguing, "In the hands of a lesser novelist, [its] developments might feel contrived, but Tartt writes with such authority and verve and understanding of character that her story becomes just as persuasive as it is suspenseful."

Critics have remarked on the number of references to Charles Dickens in the novel, and have noted the author's Dickensian approach to her themes. As with The Little Friend, The Goldfinch deals with themes of obsession, coming of age and the uncertainties of the adult world and the "randomness of existence". Art, as represented by The Goldfinch, becomes "a touchstone of order", and the "transformative power of art", one of the main themes of the novel.

=== European reception ===
The Goldfinch was described as "a great bewitching novel" by Le Monde and "masterful" by Télérama. Belgian weekly magazine HUMO called it the "book of the year", while Le Point enthused that "[c]omic and tragic, cruel and tender, intimate and vast, Le Chardonneret is one of those rare novels that require cancelling any social obligation." Tartt herself was praised as "a novelist at the top of her art" by Le Journal du Dimanche and as a "writing magician who is generous with detours, reflections and characters" by the news website NU.nl.

The Dutch newspaper de Volkskrant printed a five-star review and called it "a Bildungsroman written in a beautiful and often scintillating style. ... A rich novel and an impressive reflection on sadness and solace. And about the crucial, timeless role of art therein". De Limburger Cutting Edge also gave it a five-star review and suggested that Tartt had "written the best novel of 2013. It will completely blow you away." Their sentiment was echoed in De Telegraaf, which argues that The Goldfinch is a "rich, very readable novel", as well as in Financiele Dagblad's assessment that "Donna Tartt is an extraordinary writer and Het puttertje is a beautiful and rich novel." Another Dutch newspaper, Het Parool, sums it up as a "beautiful, exciting novel, filled with fascinating characters."

Other Dutch reviews were more mixed in their reception. NRC Handelsblad rated the book two out of five stars, writing that it was "like reading a twenty-first-century variant on Dickens", with the characters being "cliché" and not fleshed out. Vrij Nederland and De Groene Amsterdammer were also critical, arguing that the book was too drawn out.

== Awards and honors ==
The Goldfinch was awarded the Pulitzer Prize for Fiction in 2014.

It was shortlisted for 2013 National Book Critics Circle Award and the Baileys Women's Prize for Fiction. It was awarded the Andrew Carnegie Medal for Excellence in Fiction for 2014. The book was selected as one of the 10 Best Books of 2013 by the editors of the New York Times Book Review. In 2024, it was ranked 46th in the New York Times list of the 100 best books of the 21st century, and 4th on the list of readers picks.

=== Sales ===
The novel spent over thirty weeks on the New York Times bestseller list in the U.S. and on the Sunday Times hardcover fiction bestseller list in the UK. It attained the number one position for Editions Plon in France in January 2014, and in Italy the novel reached number ten on the list of bestsellers. It was a number one bestseller in Finland in June 2014 and in Germany, The Goldfinch reached number two on the Der Spiegel bestseller list.

== Film adaptation ==
John Crowley directed a 2019 film adaptation for Warner Bros. and Amazon Studios. Ansel Elgort and Oakes Fegley share the main role of Theo, and Aneurin Barnard and Finn Wolfhard share the role of Boris.
