= Philippe Sylvestre Dufour =

French Protestant apothecary, banker, collector, and writer

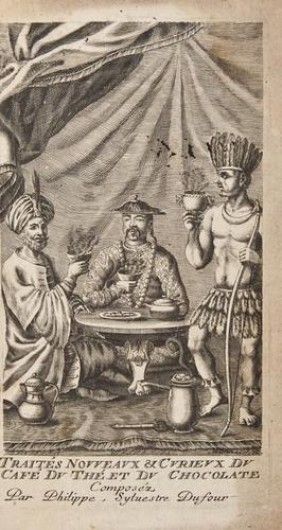
Title page of Dufour's, 'A treatise on the novelties and curiosities of coffee, tea and chocolate'.

Philippe Sylvestre Dufour (born Manosque 1622, died Vevey (Canton de Vaud) 1687) was a French Protestant apothecary, banker, collector, and writer based in Lyon.

== Biography ==
Philippe Sylvestre was born in 1622 in Manosque. After his uncle Annibal Dafour made him his universal heir, he took his patronym "Dufour".

In 1653 Dufour married Jeanne Philibert in Lyon. Together they had five children: Phillippe, Alexandre, Pierre, Anne and Daniel.

== Publications ==
Philippe Sylvestre Dufour published two works.

- De l'usage du caphé, du thé et du chocolate, Lyon, Jean Girin et Barthélémy Rivière, 1671.
- Instruction morale d'un père à son fils, qui part pour un long voyage : ou, Maniere aisée de former un jeune homme à toutes fortes de vertus, Lyon, Antoine Cellier fils, 1678.
