= Théophile Thoré-Bürger =

French journalist and art critic (1807–1869)

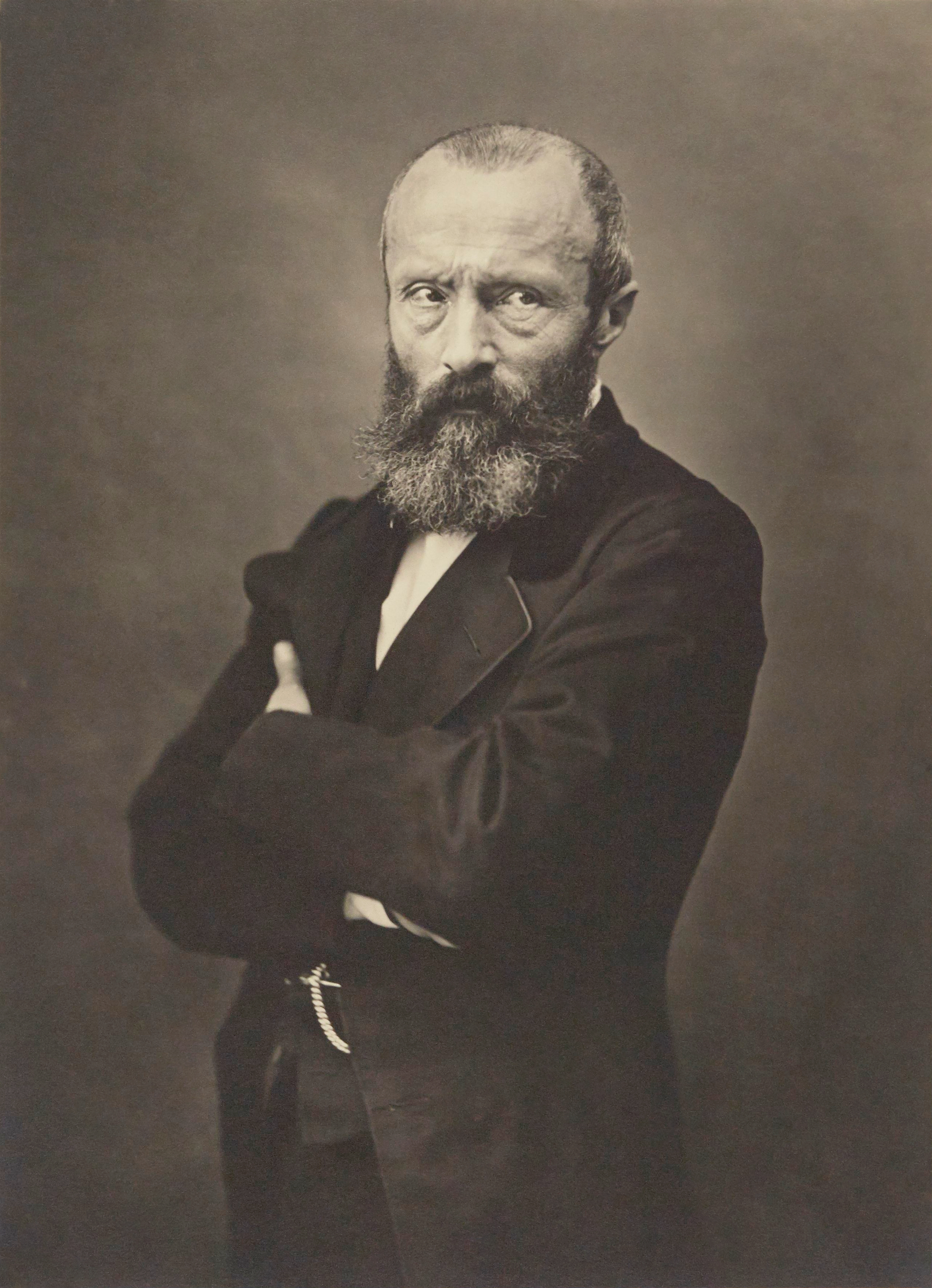
Photograph by Nadar (c. 1865)

Étienne-Joseph-Théophile Thoré (better known as Théophile Thoré-Bürger) (23 June 1807–30 April 1869) was a French journalist and art critic. He is best known today for rediscovering the work of painter Johannes Vermeer, Carel Fabritius, and several other prominent Dutch artists. He lived for more than a decade with Apolline Lacroix, the wife of his collaborator Paul Lacroix, the curator of the Bibliothèque de l'Arsenal. On Thoré-Bürger's death, she inherited his valuable art collection, much of which was eventually sold.

== Selected publications ==
- Dictionnaire de phrénologie et de physiognomonie, à l'usage des artistes, des gens du monde, des instituteurs, des pères de famille, des jurés, etc., 1836 Available online
- La Vérité sur le parti démocratique, 1840 Available online
- Catalogue de dessins des grands maîtres, provenant du cabinet de M. Villenave, 1842
- Le Salon de 1844, précédé d'une lettre à Théodore Rousseau, 1844
- Dessins de maîtres, Collection de feu M. Delbecq, de Gand, 1845 Available online
- Catalogue des estampes anciennes formant la collection de feu M. Delbecq, de Gand, 1845 Available online
- La Recherche de la liberté, 1845
- Le Salon de 1845, précédé d'une lettre à Béranger, 1845
- Le Salon de 1846, précédé d'une Lettre à George Sand, 1846 Available online
- Le Salon de 1847, précédé d'une Lettre à Firmin Barrion, 1847 Available online
- Mémoires de Caussidière, ex-préfet de police et représentant du peuple, with Marc Caussidière, 2 vol., 1849 Available online: 1, 2
- La Restauration de l'autorité, ou l'Opération césarienne, 1852
- Dans les bois, 1856
- En Ardenne, par quatre Bohémiens. Namur, Dinant, Han, Saint-Hubert, Houffalize, La Roche, Durbuy, Nandrin, Comblain, Esneux, Tilf, Spa, in collaboration with other writers, 1856
- Trésors d'art exposés à Manchester en 1857 et provenant des collections royales, des collections publiques et des collections particulières de la Grande-Bretagne, 1857
- Amsterdam et La Haye. Études sur l'école hollandaise, 1858
- Çà & là, 1858
- Musées de la Hollande, 2 vol., 1858–1860
- Études sur les peintres hollandais et flamands. Galerie d'Arenberg, à Bruxelles avec le catalogue complet de la collection, 1859
- Musée d'Anvers, 1862
- Trésors d'art en Angleterre, 1862
- Van der Meer (Vermeer) de Delft, 1866

=== Published posthumously ===
- Les Salons : études de critique et d'esthétique, 3 vol., 1893
- Thoré-Bürger peint par lui-même : lettres et notes intimes, 1900 Available online
