= Kirsten Dufour =

- Born: 23 February 1941 (age 85)
- Education: Royal Danish Academy of Fine Arts
- Known for: Performance art, activist art

Kirsten Dufour (born 23 February 1941) is a Danish visual artist. She works with performance as well as other mediums to bring attention to social injustices. Dufour was co-curator of the 2004 interdisciplinary exhibition Minority Report: Challenging Intolerance in Contemporary Denmark. She currently lives and works in Copenhagen, Denmark.
