= La Pointe, Saint Barthélemy =

La Pointe
- Quartier
- The quartier of La Pointe, Saint Barthélemy marked 18.
- Coordinates: 17°53′54″N 62°51′9″W
- Country: France
- Overseas collectivity: Saint Barthélemy

La Pointe (French pronunciation: [la pwɛ̃t]) is a quartier of Saint Barthélemy in the Caribbean. It is located in the western part of the island at the end of Gustavia.
