= Jean Dufour (1818–1883) =

French politician

- Born: 26 March 1818; Issoudun, Indre, France
- Died: 30 December 1883 (aged 65); Richetin, Indre, France
- Occupation: Politician

Jean Dufour (26 March 1818 – 30 December 1883) was a French politician. He served as a member of the National Assembly from 1871 to 1876, representing Indre. He belonged to the Orléanist parliamentary group, Centre droit. He was a knight of the Legion of Honour.
