= Barry Dufour =

British academic and author

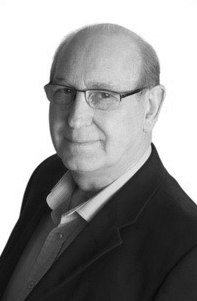
- Born: 3 August 1942; London, UK
- Occupation: University professor

Barry Dufour is a British academic and author who specializes in the area of education research. He is a visiting professor at De Montfort University, Leicester. In 1973, he co-authored with D. Lawton The New Social Studies in which they outlined their concerns that curricula be developed with age-appropriate schemes. He was the editor of the 1990 book The New Social Curriculum: A Guide to Cross-Curricular Issues which also focused on issues of curricula.

In addition to his work in the field of education, in 1977 he wrote The World of Pop and Rock, called by Music in Education, at the time, "probably the best book yet on the pop industry written for teenagers". He is the brother of former Libertines drummer Paul Dufour.

== Principal books ==
- Lawton, D. and Dufour, B. The New Social Studies, London: Heinemann Educational Books, 1973 (first edition) and 1976 (second edition)
- Dufour, B., The World of Pop and Rock, London: Macdonald, 1977
- Dufour, B., (ed), New Movements in the Social Sciences and Humanities, London: Temple Smith/Gower, 1982
- Dufour, B., (ed), The New Social Curriculum: A Guide to Cross-Curricular Issues, Cambridge: Cambridge University Press, 1990
- Breslin, T. and Dufour, B., (eds) Developing Citizens: A Comprehensive Introduction to Effective Citizenship Education in the Secondary School, London: Hodder Murray, 2006
- Dufour, B. and Curtis, W., Studying Education: an Introduction to the Key Disciplines in Education Studies, Maidenhead: Open University Press, 2011
- Dufour, B., Disruptive Behaviour in Schools: A Critical Introduction, London: Bloomsbury, forthcoming 2016/2017
