= Pierre Dufour (canoeist) =

Swiss canoeist

Medal record

Men's canoe slalom

Representing Switzerland

World Championships
Silver medal – second place	1953 Meran	C-2 team
Bronze medal – third place	1951 Steyr	C-2 team

Pierre Dufour is a Swiss retired slalom canoeist who competed in the early-to-mid 1950s. He won two medals in the C-2 team event at the ICF Canoe Slalom World Championships with a silver in 1953 and a bronze in 1951.
