= Dufour-Lapointe =

Dufour-Lapointe is a surname. Notable people with the surname include:

- Maxime Dufour-Lapointe (born 1989), Canadian Olympic freestyle skier
- Chloé Dufour-Lapointe (born 1991), Canadian Olympic freestyle skier
- Justine Dufour-Lapointe (born 1994), Canadian Olympic freestyle skier

== See also ==
- Dufour (surname)
- Lapointe (surname)
