= Paul Lacroix =

French author and journalist (1806–1884)

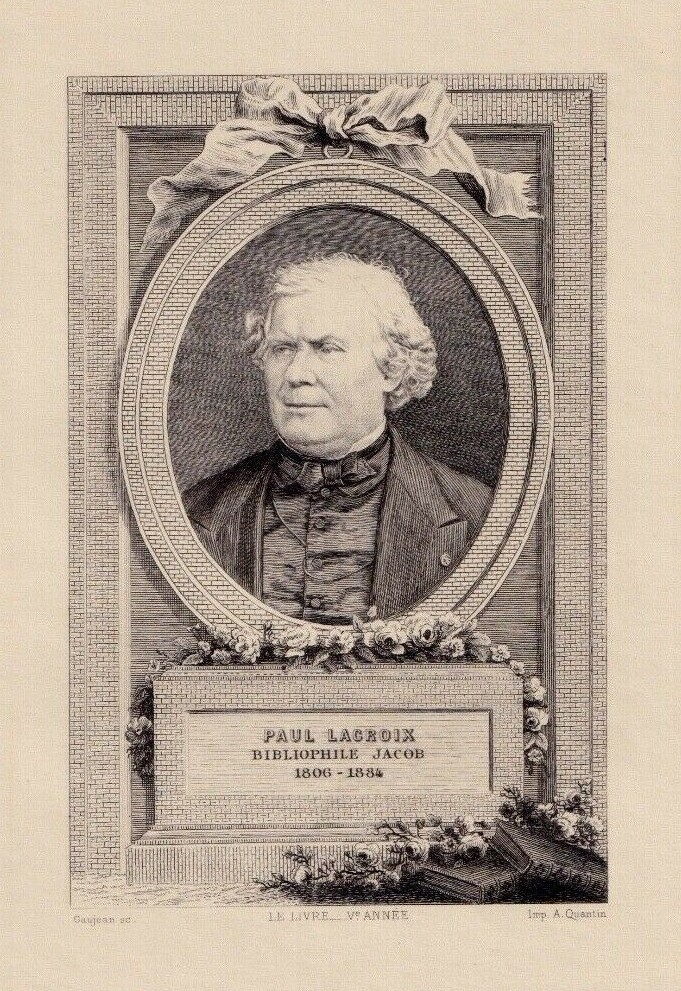
- Born: 27 February 1806; Paris
- Died: 16 October 1884 (aged 78); Paris
- Occupations: Historian; Bibliographer

Paul Lacroix (French: [lakʁwa]; 27 February 1806 – 16 October 1884) was a French writer and journalist. He is known best by his pseudonym P.L. Jacob, bibliophile, or Bibliophile Jacob, suggested by his great interest in libraries and books generally.

== Biography ==
Lacroix was born in Paris, the son of a novelist. He was a prolific and varied writer, composing more than twenty historical romances and a variety of serious historical works, including histories of Napoleon III and of the Czar Nicholas I of Russia.

He was the joint author with Ferdinand Séré of a five-volume work, Le moyen âge et la renaissance (1847), a profusely illustrated standard work on the manners, customs and dress of the Renaissance. He also wrote many monographs on phases of the history of culture, including Manners, Custom and Dress During the Middle Ages and During the Renaissance Period. Someone using the name Pierre Dufour published an exhaustive six-volume Histoire de la prostitution (1851–1854), which has always been attributed to Lacroix. His works concerning bibliography were also numerous, as was his periodical Revue universelle des arts [Universal Review of the Arts], which he initiated in 1855. In 1855 he was appointed librarian of the Arsenal Library, Paris.

He married Apolline Biffe on 7 May 1834. She lived with Paul Lacroix's collaborator, art collector Théophile Thoré-Bürger, for more than a decade until his death.

== Works (selection) ==
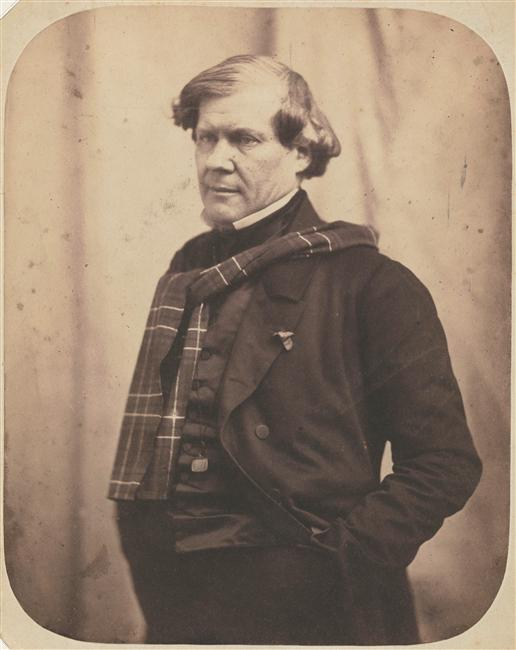
Paul Lacroix photographed by Nadar

- L’Origine des cartes à jouer, 1835
- L'Homme au Masque de Fer, 1837
- Bibliothèque de M. G. de Pixerécourt, 1838
- Bibliothèque dramatique de M. de Soleinne, 1843-1845
- Bibliothèque dramatique de Pont de Vesle, 1846
- Costumes historiques de la France d’après les monuments les plus authentiques, 1852
- Histoire de la prostitution, 1853
- Œuvres complètes de François Villon, nouvelle édition revue, corrigée et mise en ordre avec des notes historiques et littéraires, par P. L. Jacob, Bibliophile, Paris, P. Jannet, 1854
- Plus romanesque aventure de ma vie, Paris, P. Henneton, 1854 (read on Gallica).
- Ballets et mascarades de Cour, de Henri III à Louis XIV (1581-1652), 1868-1870
- Vie militaire et religieuse au Moyen Âge et à l’époque de la Renaissance, 1869
- Aventures de l’abbé de Choisy habillé en femme, 1870
- Mœurs, usages et costumes au Moyen Âge et à l’époque de la Renaissance, 1871-1877
- Œuvres poétiques de Marc-Claude de Buttet, 2 tomes, in -8, 1880.

== English translations published in the United States ==
- History of prostitution among all the peoples of the world: from the most remote antiquity to the present day 3. vol. (1926) Translated from the original French (Histoire de la prostitution, 1853) by Samuel Putnam
- Madame de Sévigné and Her Children at the Court of Versailles 1882 translated by J. Timothy Hunt, 2011, Adhemar Press, ISBN 9780578062754
- Danse Macabre [1832] translated by Brian Stableford, 2013, Black Coat Press, ISBN 9781612272054

== Sources ==
- Ferdinand Hoefer, Nouvelle Biographie générale, t. 27, Paris, Firmin-Didot, 1861, (p. 595–8).
