= 1654 in art =

Events from the year 1654 in art.

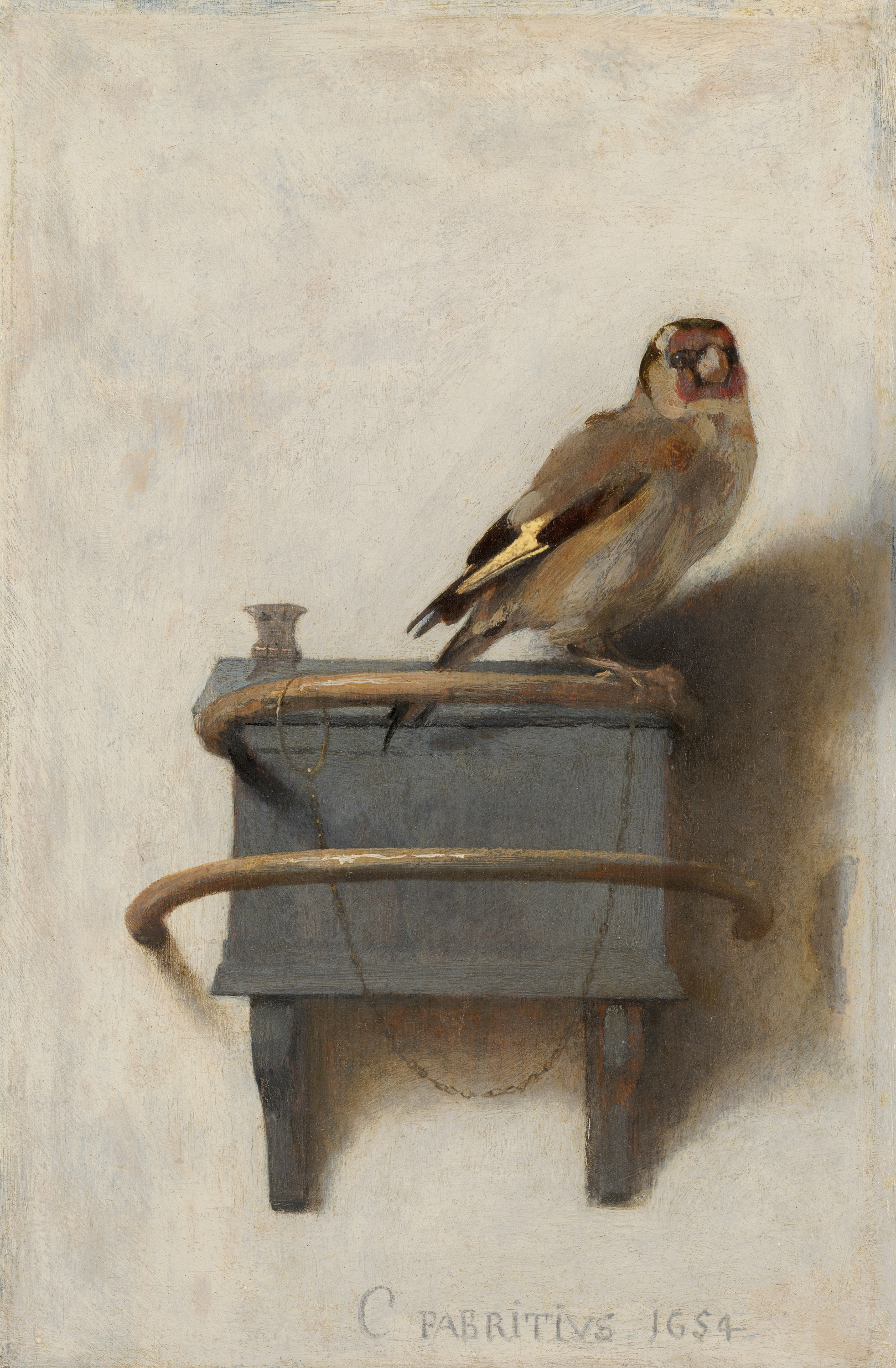
The Goldfinch by Carel Fabritius, 1654.

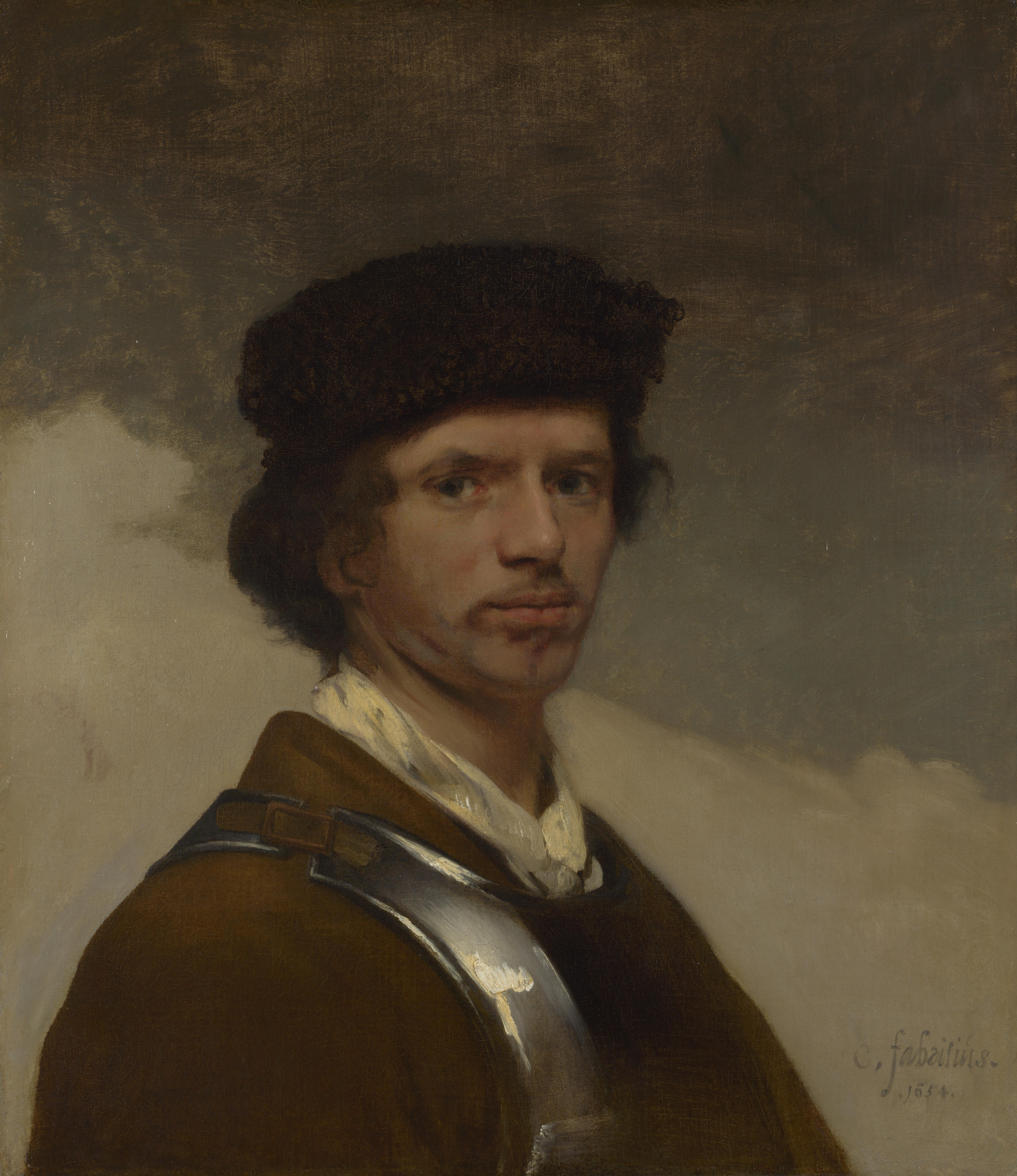
Young Man in a Fur Cap, self-portrait of Carel Fabritius, not long before his death in the Delft Explosion.

== Events ==
- October 12 – The Delft Explosion destroys the city of Delft, killing painter Carel Fabritius and destroying his home, studio and most of his paintings: only five are known to exist. Egbert van der Poel produces paintings of the explosion.

== Paintings ==
- Willem Drost paints Bathsheba with King David's Letter, Portrait of an Officer in a Red Beret and (at about this date) Portrait of a Young Woman with her Hands Folded on a Book and Portrait of a Young Woman in a Brocade Gown.
- Carel Fabritius paints his Young Man in a Fur Cap, The Sentry, and The Goldfinch, showing use of lighting effects with a bright background.
- Rembrandt completes Bathsheba at Her Bath and Woman Bathing in a Stream (both featuring his mistress Hendrickje) and paints his Portrait of Jan Six.
- Bartholomeus van der Helst paints The Van Aras Family.
- Guercino paints Samson and Delilah.
- Philips Koninck paints The Feast of Bacchus.

== Births ==
- February 19 – Antonio Bellucci (or Antonijus Belutis), Italian painter from Treviso (died 1726)
- February 24 – Bartolomeo Altomonte, Italian painter (died 1783)
- March 10 – Giuseppe Bartolomeo Chiari, Italian painter of frescoes (died 1727)
- November 2 – Giuseppe Passeri, Italian painter active in his native city of Rome (died 1714)
- November 23 – Jan van Kessel the Younger, Flemish-Spanish painter (died 1708)
- December 10 – Giovanni Gioseffo dal Sole, Italian landscape painter and engraver from Bologna (died 1719)
- date unknown
  - Bartolomeo Guidobono, Italian painter active mainly in Northern Italy (died 1709)
  - Francisco Leonardoni, Italian painter active mainly in Spain (died 1711)
  - Giacomo del Pò, Italian painter of emblematical and allegorical subjects (died 1726)
  - Giacomo Antonio Ponsonelli, Italian Rococo sculptor (died 1735)
  - Michelangelo Ricciolino, Italian church painter of the Baroque period (died 1715)
- probable – Herman Moll, engraver active in England (died 1732)

== Deaths ==
- January 17 – Paulus Potter, Dutch painter specializing in animals in landscapes (born 1625)
- January 23 – Thomas Willeboirts Bosschaert, painter (born 1613)
- February 8 – Luca Ferrari, Italian painter (born 1605)
- April 5 – Lorenzo Garbieri, Italian painter (born 1580)
- June 10 – Alessandro Algardi, Italian sculptor active mainly in Rome (born 1598)
- October 12 – Carel Fabritius, Dutch painter (born 1622)
- December 1 – Giacomo Apollonio, Italian painter (born 1584)
- date unknown
  - Baccio Ciarpi, Italian painter (born 1574)
  - Nicolaes de Giselaer, Dutch painter and draughtsman (born 1583)
