= Hruševo =

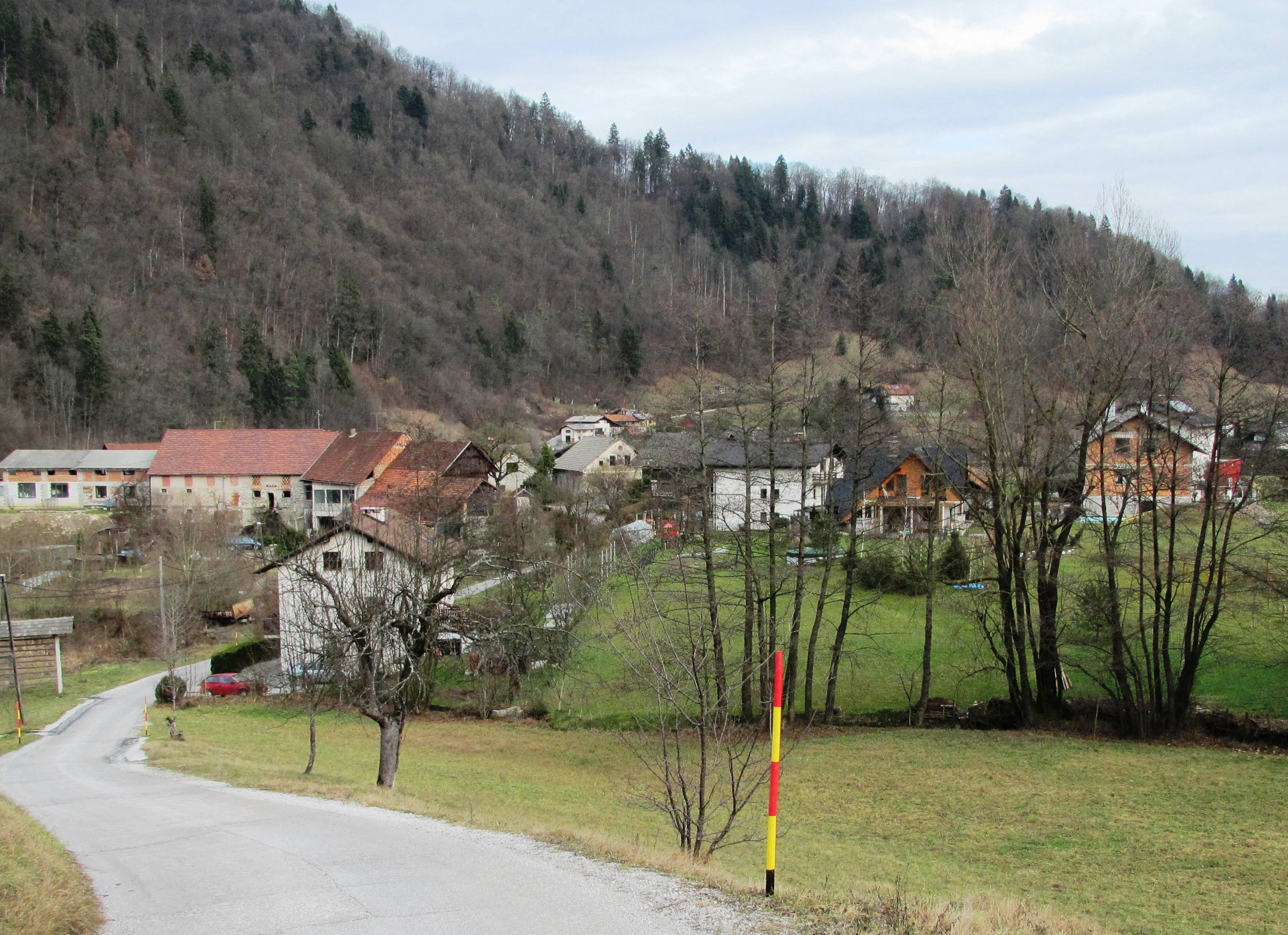
- View of Hruševo from the south, showing the hamlet of Log

- Location in Slovenia
- Coordinates: 46°4′12.83″N 14°23′59.24″E
- Country: Slovenia
- Traditional region: Upper Carniola
- Statistical region: Central Slovenia
- Municipality: Dobrova–Polhov Gradec

Area
  - Total: 2.5 km^{2} (0.97 sq mi)
- Elevation: 318.7 m (1,046 ft)

Population (2020)
  - Total: 527
  - Density: 210/km^{2} (550/sq mi)

Hruševo (pronounced [ˈxɾuːʃɛʋɔ]) is a settlement northeast of Dobrova in the Municipality of Dobrova–Polhov Gradec in the Upper Carniola region of Slovenia. It includes the hamlets of Log, Selo, and Na Govcu. Hruševnik Creek flows through the valley south of the main part of Hruševo, and then separates this and Log from Selo and Na Govcu before joining the Gradaščica River.

== Name ==
Hruševo was attested in historical sources as Chrovssay in 1303, and as Chruͦschi, Cruschewͦ, and Cruschawͦ in 1498, among other spellings. The name Hruševo is derived from the Slovene word hruška 'pear' and, like similar names (e.g., Hruševica, Hruševka, Hruševje), originally referred to the local vegetation. In the past it was known as Hruschowa in German.

== Church ==
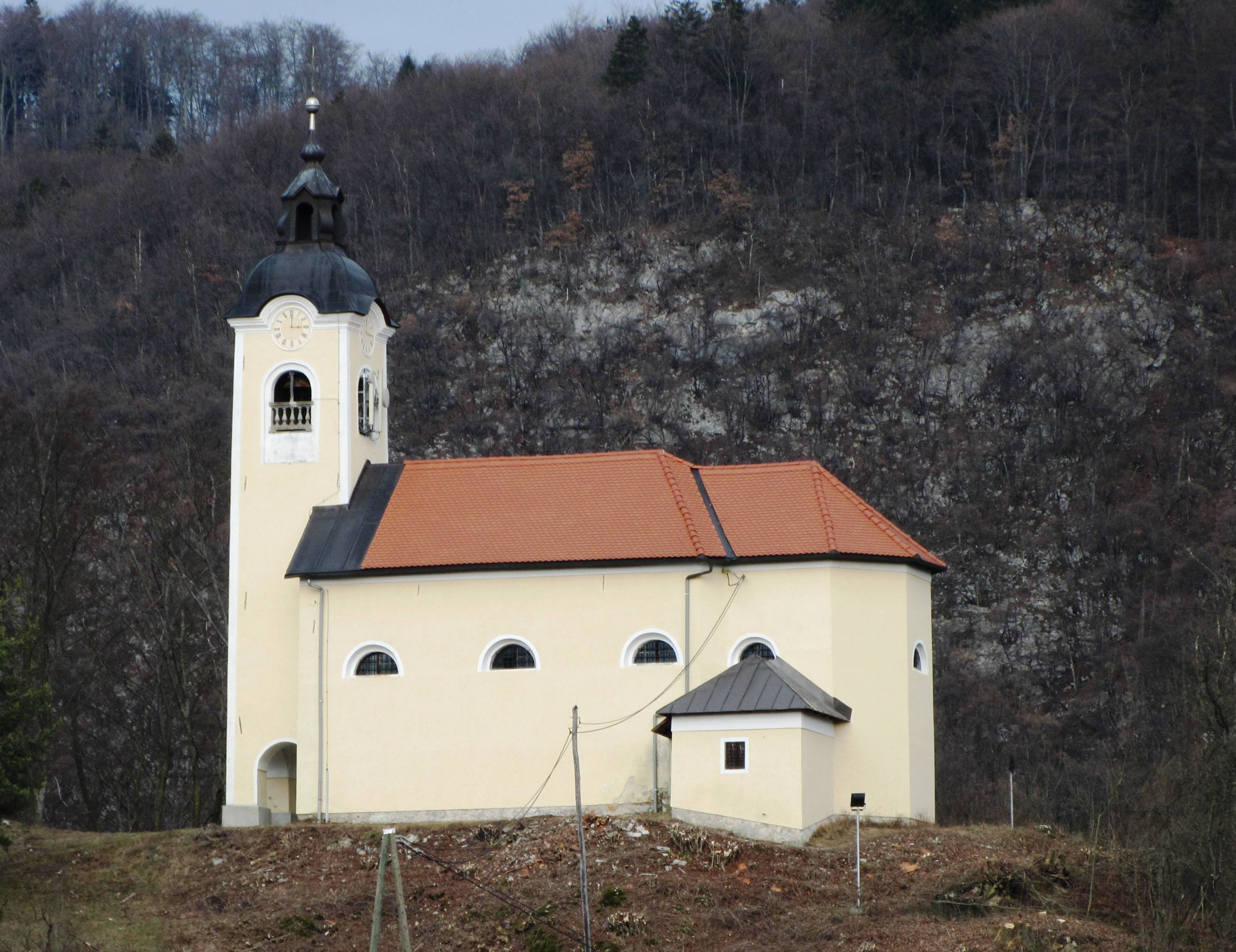
St. George's Church above Hruševo

The church in Hruševo was originally subordinate to the proto-parish of Šentvid nad Ljubljano. The church was assigned to Dobrova when it became a vicariate in 1723, and when Dobrova was elevated to a parish in 1784 it became part of that parish.

The current local church, dedicated to Saint George, stands on Oprtice Hill (413 m) to the north of the main settlement. It dates from the late eighteenth century. The previous church stood at a lower location in the center of the village and was greatly damaged during a Turkish attack in 1476. The church contains a painting of John of Nepomuk by Valentin Metzinger from 1749 and a painting of Philip Neri by the Italian painter Michelangelo Ricciolino.

== Second World War ==
On 7 May 1942 a Slovenian National Guard (Narodna zaščita) unit ambushed a motorized Italian convoy from the Granatieri di Sardegna Mechanized Brigade in Hruševo, resulting in 33 dead and 82 wounded Italian soldiers and officers. This was the deadliest attack against Italian forces in Slovenia until that time. The same month the Italians burned part of the village. In November 1942 the Partisans murdered nine members of the Hudnik family in revenge for sheltering a deserter, whom they also killed. This was the largest family massacre in Slovenia during the war. The family was buried in a mass grave above nearby Babna Gora. On 12 March 1943, the Partisans set the village church on fire and attempted to dynamite the bell tower, but the fuse was destroyed by two local farmers.

== Economy ==
The economy of the village is traditionally tied to production of potatoes, grain, beef, and milk.
