= Curvilinear perspective =

Graphical projection from 3D to 2D which tends to curve straight lines

Curvilinear barrel distortion

Curvilinear pincushion distortion

Curvilinear perspective, also five-point perspective, is a graphical projection used to draw 3D objects on 2D surfaces, for which (straight) lines on the 3D object are projected to curves on the 2D surface that are typically not straight (hence the qualifier "curvilinear"). It was formally codified in 1968 by the artists and art historians André Barre and Albert Flocon in the book La Perspective curviligne, which was translated into English in 1987 as Curvilinear Perspective: From Visual Space to the Constructed Image and published by the University of California Press.

Curvilinear perspective is sometimes colloquially called fisheye perspective, by analogy to a fisheye lens. In computer animation and motion graphics, it may also be called tiny planet.

== History ==
An early example of approximated five-point curvilinear perspective is within the Arnolfini Portrait (1434) by the Flemish Primitive Jan van Eyck. Later examples may be found in mannerist painter Parmigianino Self-portrait in a Convex Mirror (c. 1524) and A View of Delft (1652) by the Dutch Golden Age painter Carel Fabritius.

In 1959, Flocon had acquired a copy of Grafiek en tekeningen by M. C. Escher who strongly impressed him with his use of bent and curved perspective, which influenced the theory Flocon and Barre were developing. They started a long correspondence, in which Escher called Flocon a "kindred spirit".

== Horizon and vanishing points ==
A comparison of the same object displayed on the left using a five-point curvilinear perspective and on the right, using a three-point perspective

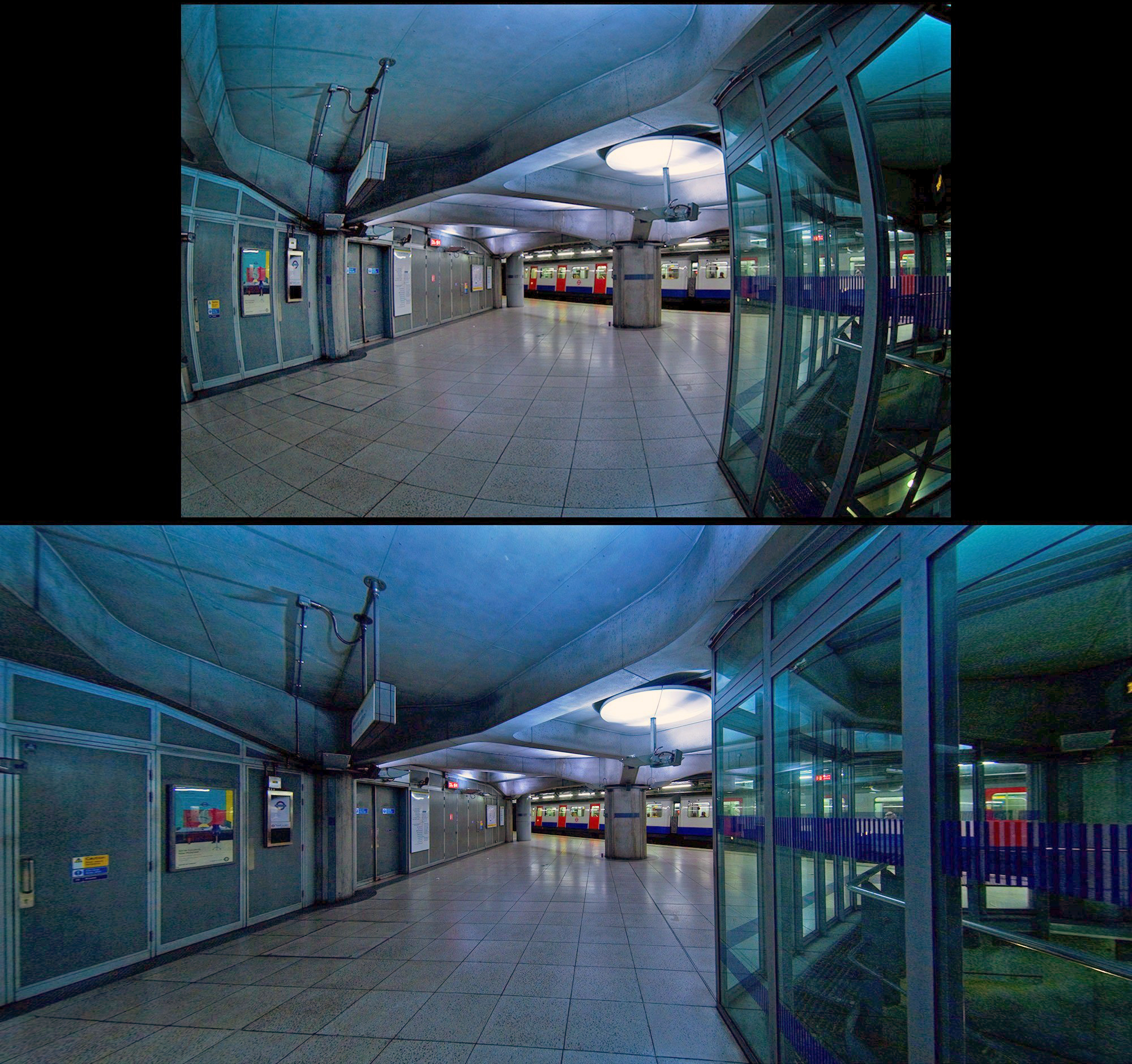
Curvilinearity in photography: Curvilinear (above) and rectilinear (below) image. Notice the barrel distortion typical for fisheye lenses in the curvilinear image. While this example has been rectilinear-corrected by software, high quality wide-angle lenses are built with optical rectilinear correction.

The system uses both curved perspective lines and an array of straight converging ones to approximate the image on the retina of the eye, which is itself spherical, more accurately than the traditional linear perspective, which only uses straight lines but is very distorted at the edges.

It uses either four, five or more vanishing points:

- In five-point (fisheye) perspective: Four vanishing points are placed around in a circle, they are named N, W, S, E, plus one vanishing point in the center of the circle.
- Four, or infinite-point perspective is the one that (arguably) most approximates the perspective of the human eye, while at the same time being effective for making impossible spaces, while five point is the curvilinear equivalent of one point perspective, so is four point the equivalent of two point perspective.

This technique can, like two-point perspective, use a vertical line as a horizon line, creating both a worms and birds eye view at the same time. It uses four or more points equally spaced along a horizon line, all vertical lines are made perpendicular to the horizon line, while orthogonals are created using a compass set on a line made at a 90-degree angle through each of the four vanishing points.

== Geometric relationship ==
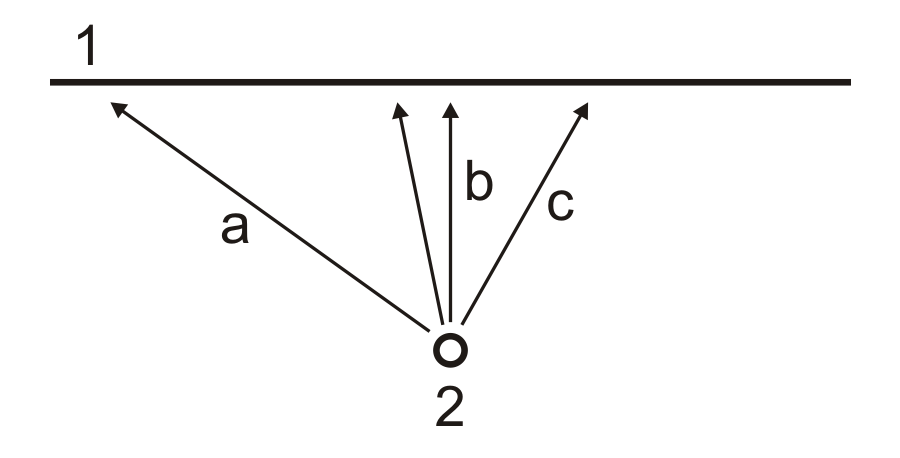
Figure 1 shows the wall 1 and the observer 2 from the upper projection.

Distances a and c between the viewer and the wall are greater than the b distance, so adopting the principle that when an object is a greater distance from the observer, it becomes smaller, the wall is reduced and thus appears distorted at the edges.

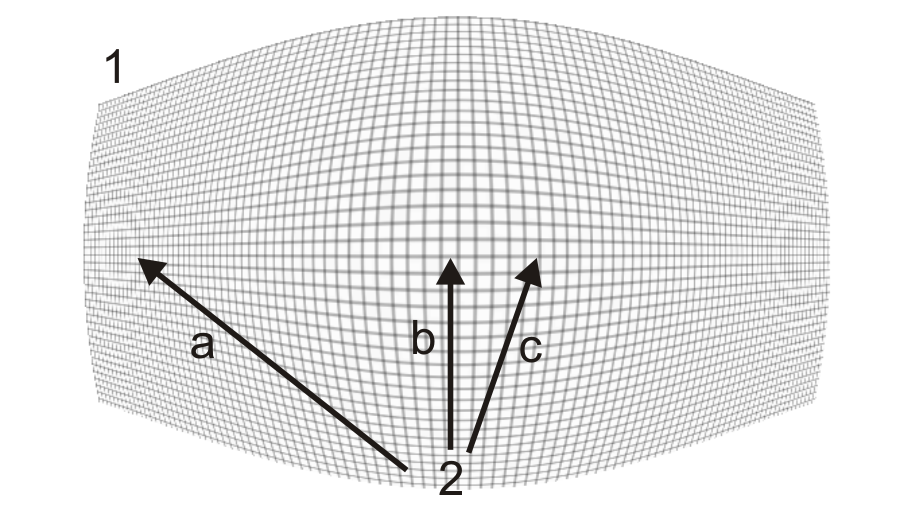
Figure 2 shows the same situation from the observer's view point.

== Mathematics ==
If a point has the 3D Cartesian coordinates (x,y,z):

$$P_\mathrm{3D}= (x, y, z)$$

Denoting distance from the point to the origin by d = √x^{2} + y^{2} + z^{2},

then the transformation of the point to a curvilinear reference system of radius R is

$$P_\mathrm{2D} = \left(\frac{xR}{d}, \frac{yR}{d}\right)$$

(if d = 0, then the point is at the origin, which means its projection is undefined)

This is derived by first projecting the 3D point onto a sphere with radius R that centers on the origin, so that we obtain an image of the point that has coordinates

$$P_\mathrm{sphere} = (x, y, z) * \left(\frac{R}{d}\right)$$

Then, we do a parallel projection that is parallel with the z-axis to project the point on the sphere onto the paper at z = R, thus obtaining

$$P_\mathrm{image} = \left(\frac{xR}{d}, \frac{yR}{d}, R\right)$$

Since we are not concerned with the fact that the paper is resting on the z = R plane, we ignore the z-coordinate of the image point, thus obtaining

$$P_\mathrm{2D} = \left(\frac{xR}{d}, \frac{yR}{d}\right) = R * \left(\frac{x}{\sqrt{x^2+y^2+z^2}}, \frac{y}{\sqrt{x^2+y^2+z^2}}\right)$$

Since changing $R$ only amounts to a scaling, it is usually defined to be unity, simplifying the formula further to:

$$P_\mathrm{2D} = \left(\frac{x}{d}, \frac{y}{d}\right) = \left(\frac{x}{\sqrt{x^2+y^2+z^2}}, \frac{y}{\sqrt{x^2+y^2+z^2}}\right)$$

A line that does not pass through the origin is projected to a great circle on the sphere, which is further projected to an ellipse on the plane. The ellipse has the property that its long axis is a diameter of the "bounding circle".

== Examples ==
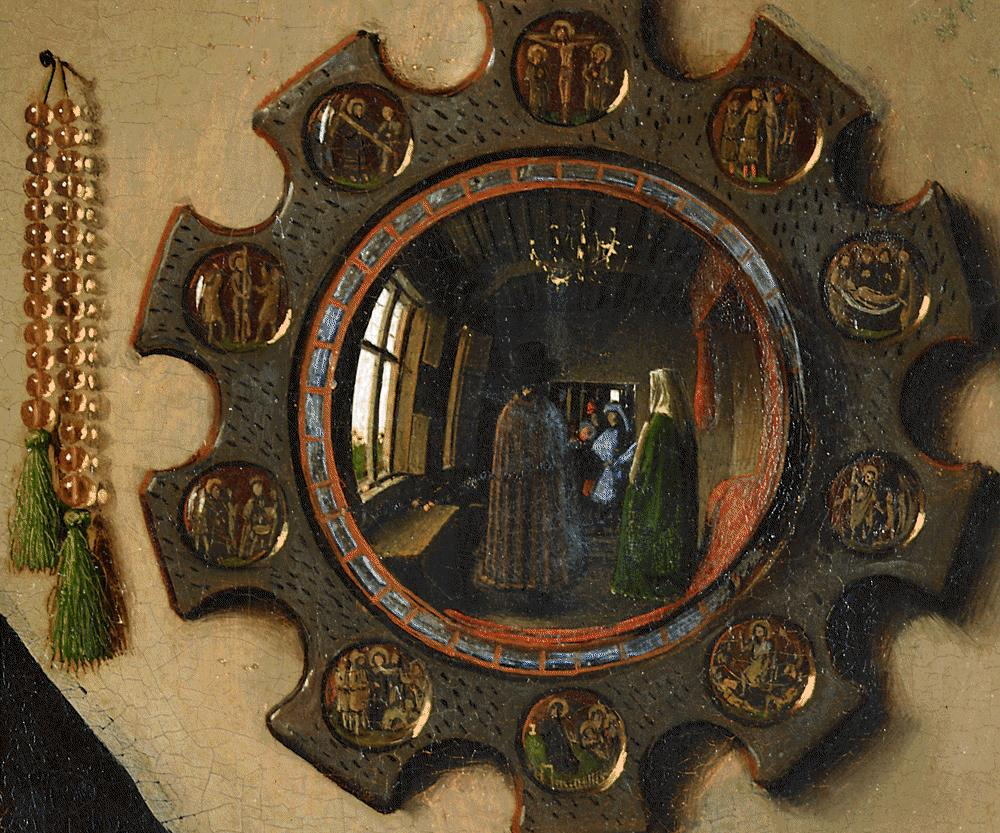
Detail of convex mirror in Jan van Eyck's Arnolfini Portrait, 1434

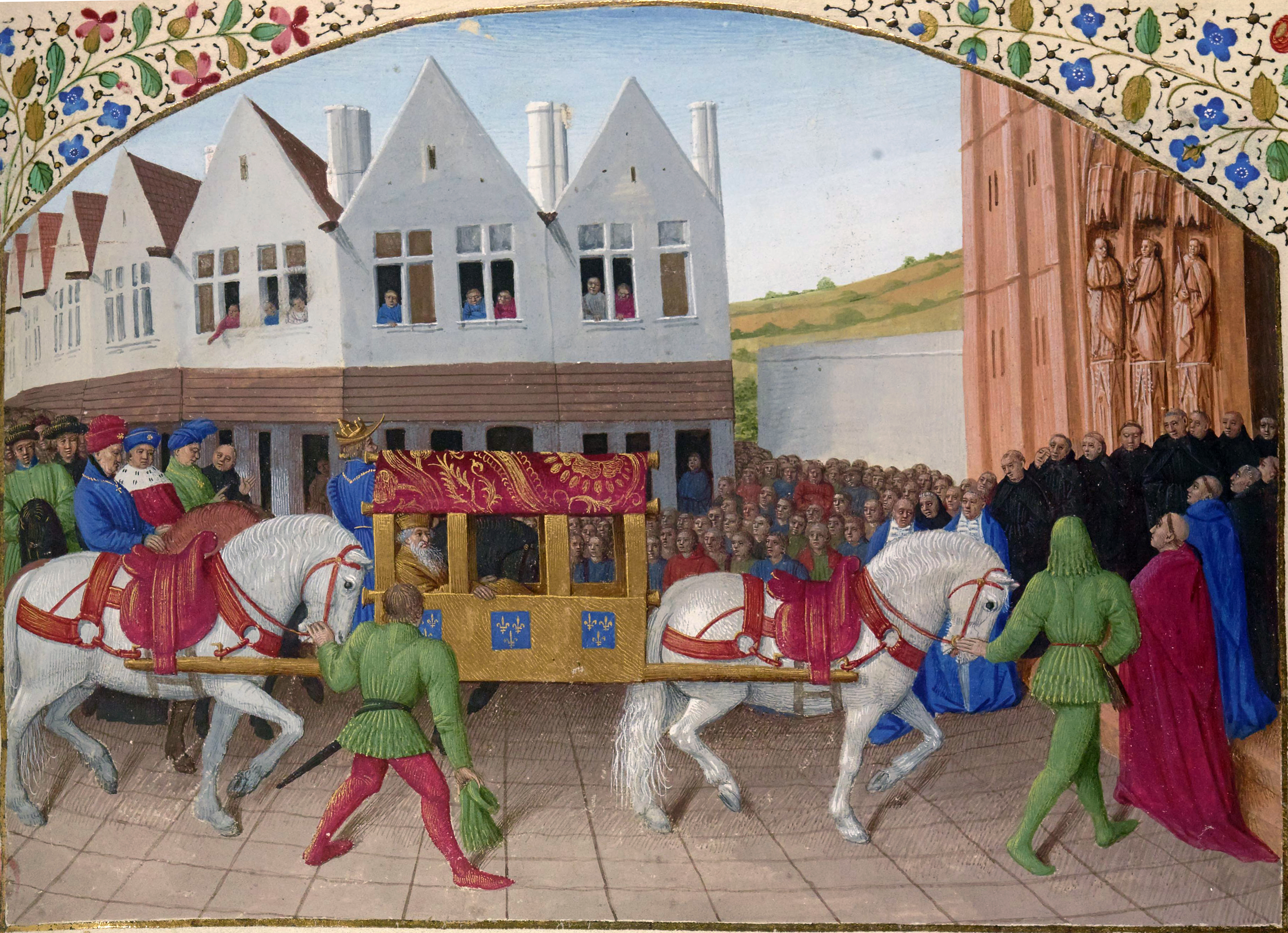
Jean Fouquet, Arrival of Emperor Charles IV at the Basilica St Denis, c. 1455–1460

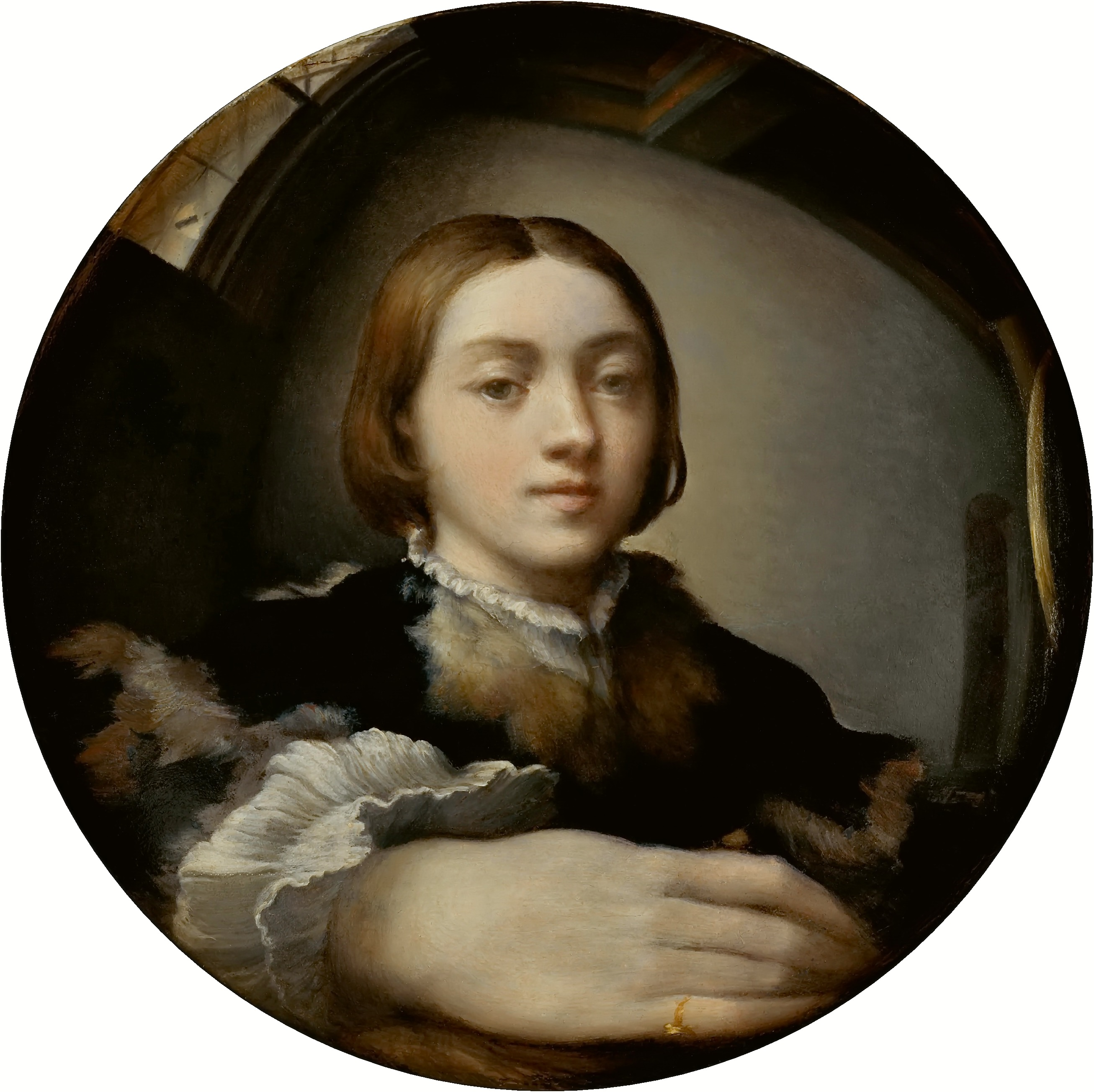
Parmigianino, Self-portrait in a Convex Mirror, c. 1524

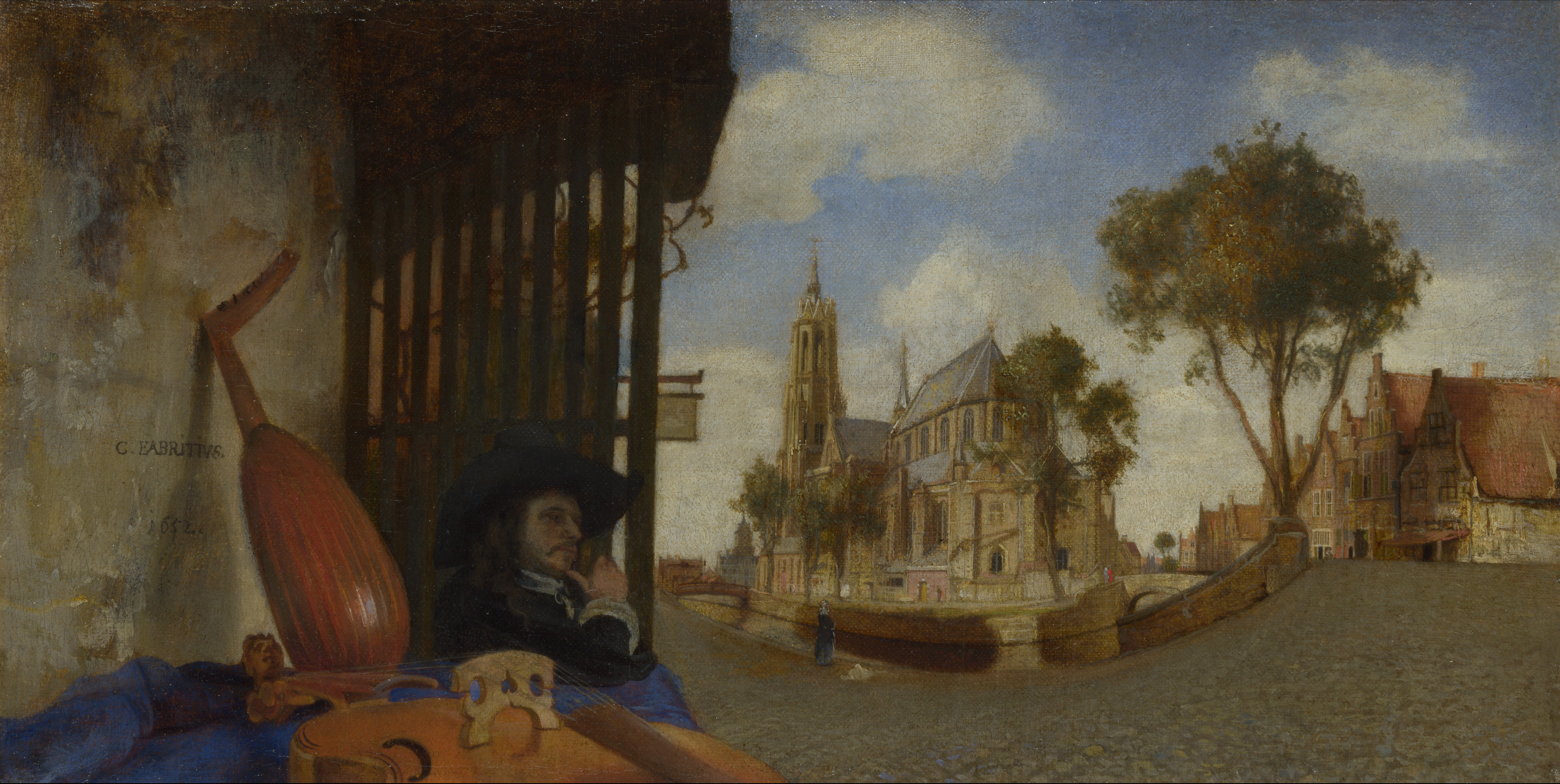
Carel Fabritius, A View of Delft, 1652

== See also ==
- Graphical projection
- Perspective (graphical)
- Mathematics and art
- M. C. Escher
- Curvilinear coordinates
