= Hera (painting) =

Painting by Carel Fabritius

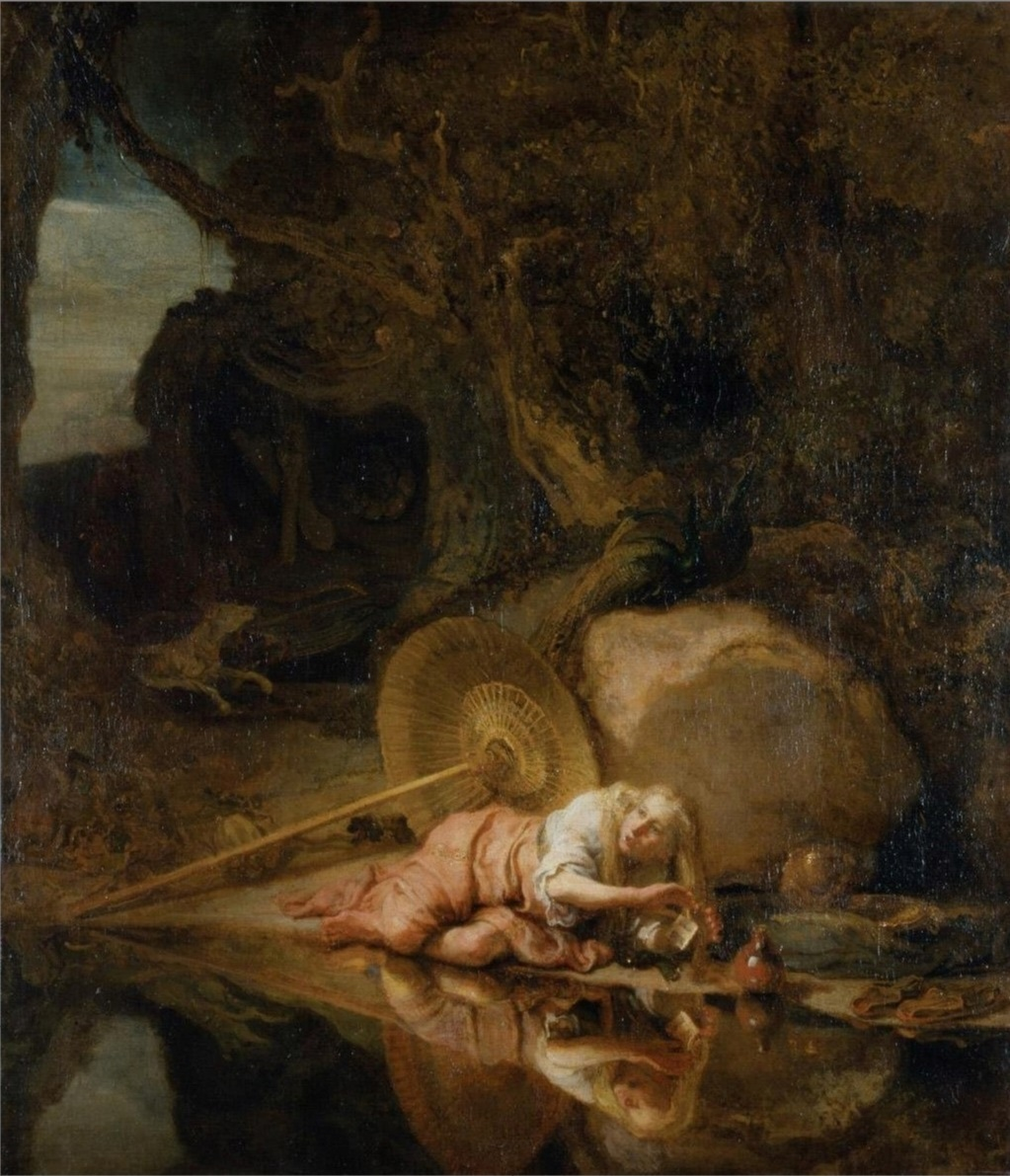
Hera (c. 1643) by Carel Fabritius

Hera or Hera Hiding During the Battle Between the Gods and the Giants is a c. 1643 oil on canvas painting by Carel Fabritius, produced during his apprenticeship in Rembrandt's studio or shortly afterwards. It is now in the Pushkin Museum in Moscow.

== Title ==
Its present title was given in a 2004 catalogue of the Museum's collections due to the presence of peacocks, which are associated with Hera. The longer version of the title refers to her being sent to the home of Oceanus and Tethys by her mother Rhea during the Titanomachy. However, it is unclear if this interpretation is correct, as it does not explain why she is interrupted while combing her hair or why she does not appear to be near the ocean. In 1883, the painting was thought to depict Narcissus, but this interpretation also falls short, as it does not account for the presence of the peacocks, the running quadruped, or why the figure looks up from the water rather than gazes at their reflection.

== Bibliography ==
- (in Dutch) Duparc, F. J., 2004, Carel Fabritius (1622–1654). Zijn leven en zijn werk, in: Carel Fabritius, 1622–1654, Zwolle, Waanders, p. 33–34
- (in Dutch) Seelig, G. & Suchtelen, A. van, 2004, Catalogus, in: Carel Fabritius, 1622–1654, Zwolle, Waanders, p. 91–94 (cat. 3)
- Duparc, F. J., 2006, "Results of the Recent Art-Historical and Technical Research on Carel Fabritius's Early Work", Oud Holland 119 (2006), p. 76–89
