= Staatliches Museum Schwerin =

Art gallery and museum in Schwerin, Mecklenburg-Vorpommern, Germany

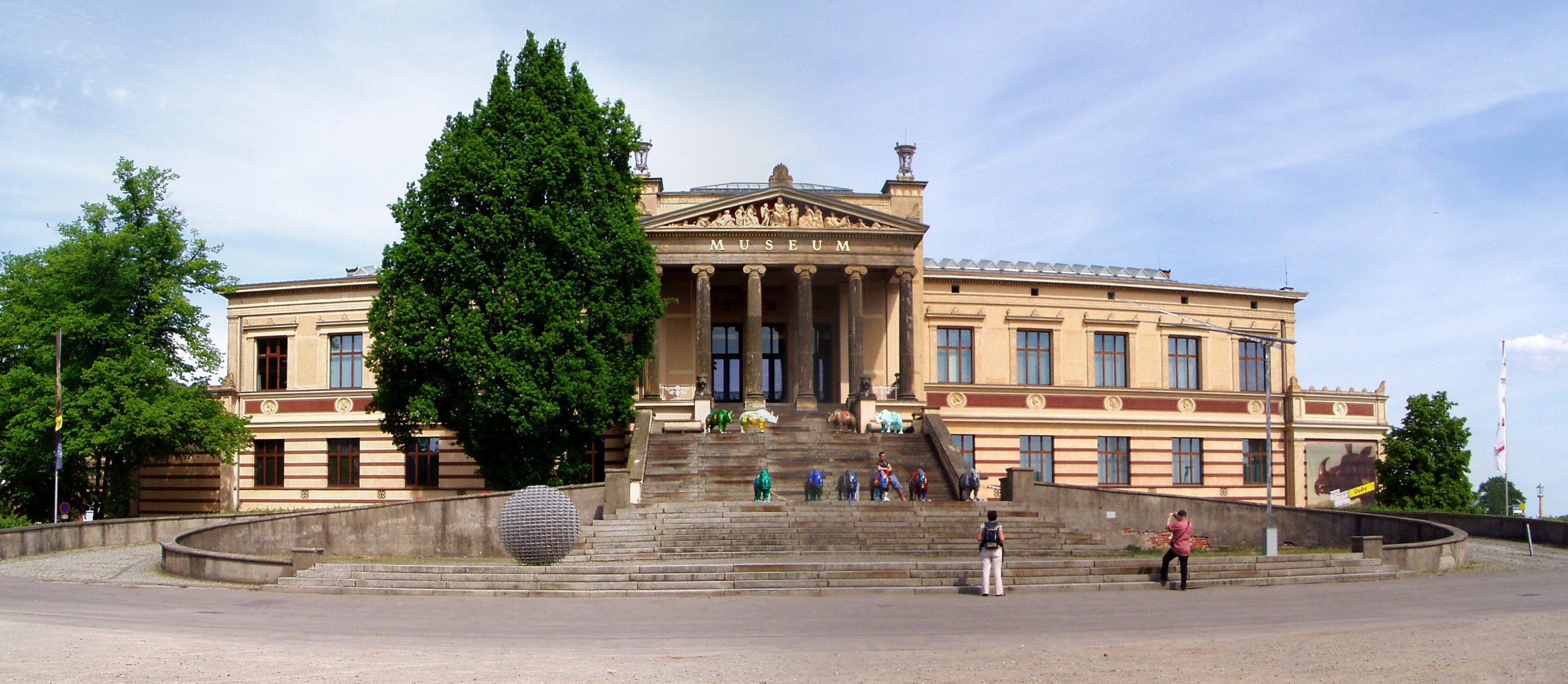
- The entrance in 2008
- Interactive fullscreen map
- Location: Schwerin, Germany
- Coordinates: 53°37′35″N 11°25′06″E

The Staatliches Museum Schwerin (State Museum Schwerin) is an art gallery and museum in Schwerin in Germany. It was established by Frederick Francis II, Grand Duke of Mecklenburg-Schwerin in 1882 its historicist Haupthaus as the Staatsgalerie next to the Staatstheater. Its other locations are opposite the Schweriner Schloss and in the former residences at Schloss Güstrow and Schloss Ludwigslust.

== Collections ==
It is nationally known for its medieval collections, including the Neustädt Altarpiece and its 17th-century Dutch and Flemish collections. It also holds major collections of Fürstenberg porcelain. With 90 works, the Staatliches Museum Schwerin owns one of the most significant collections of French-American artist Marcel Duchamp in Europe.

The museum is a member of the Konferenz Nationaler Kultureinrichtungen, a union of more than twenty cultural institutions in the former East Germany.

== Gallery ==
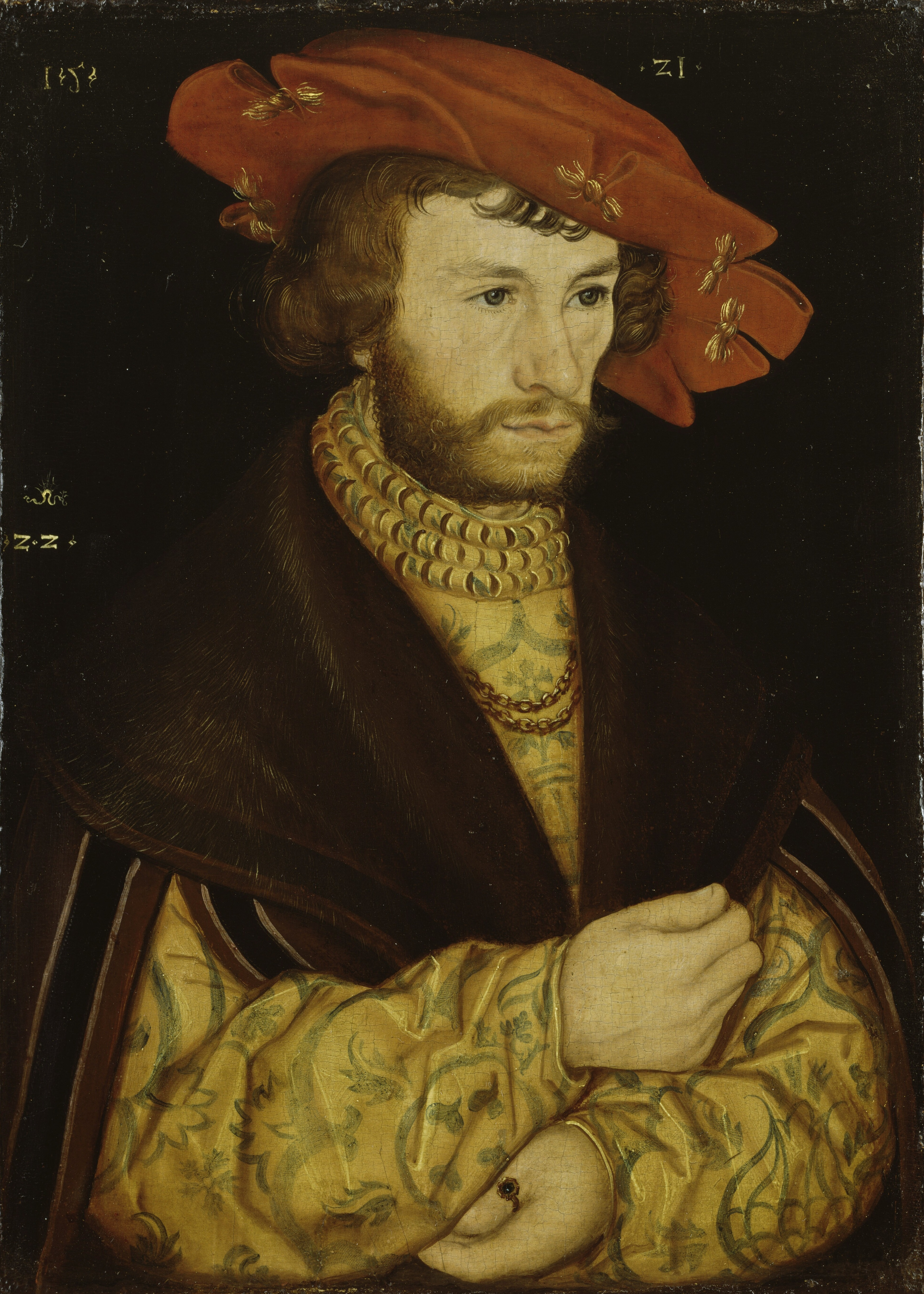
Lucas Cranach the Elder: Portrait of a young man in a hat, 1521

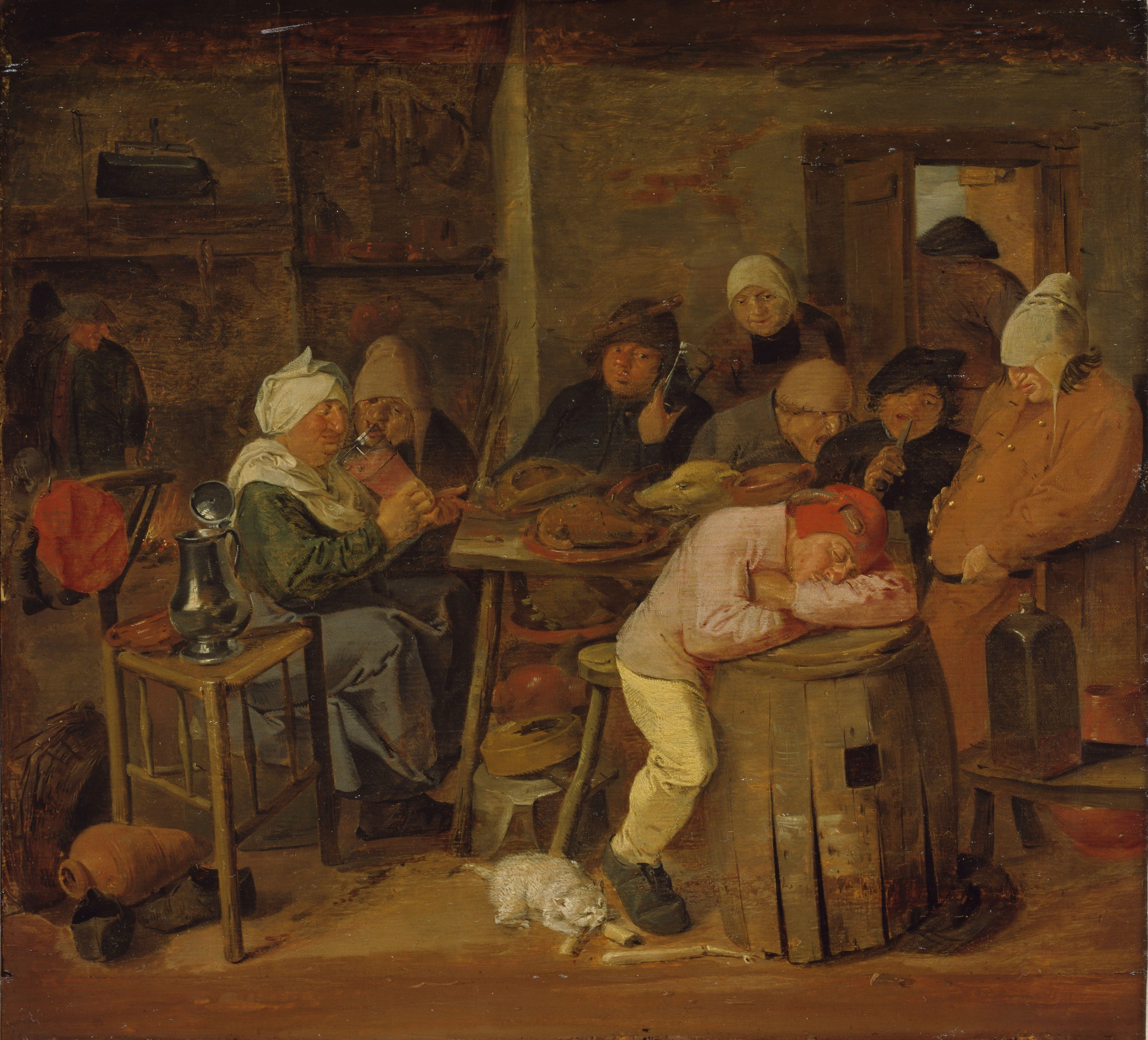
Adriaen Brouwer: Schlachtfest, c 1630-40

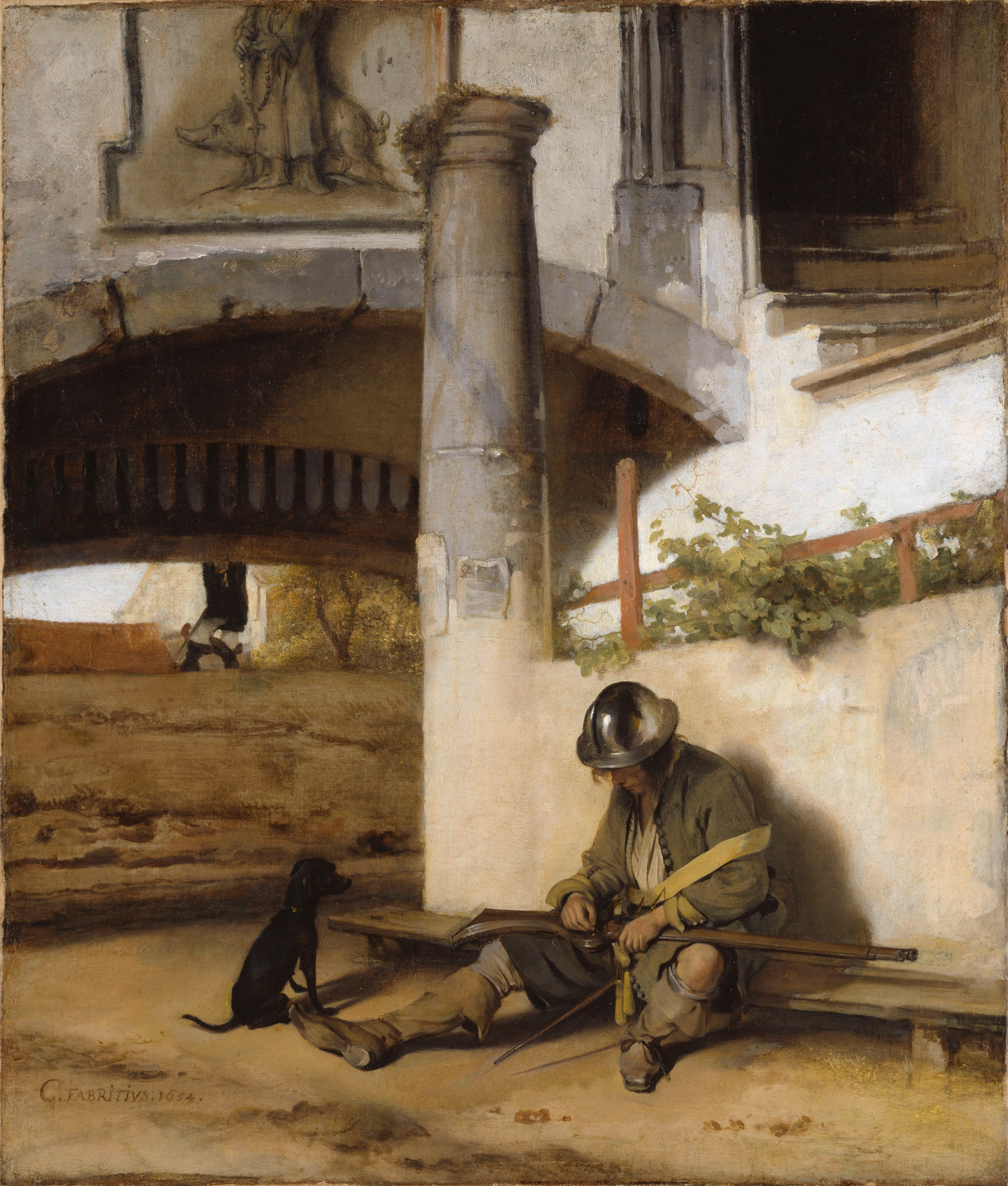
Carel Fabritius: The Sentry, 1654

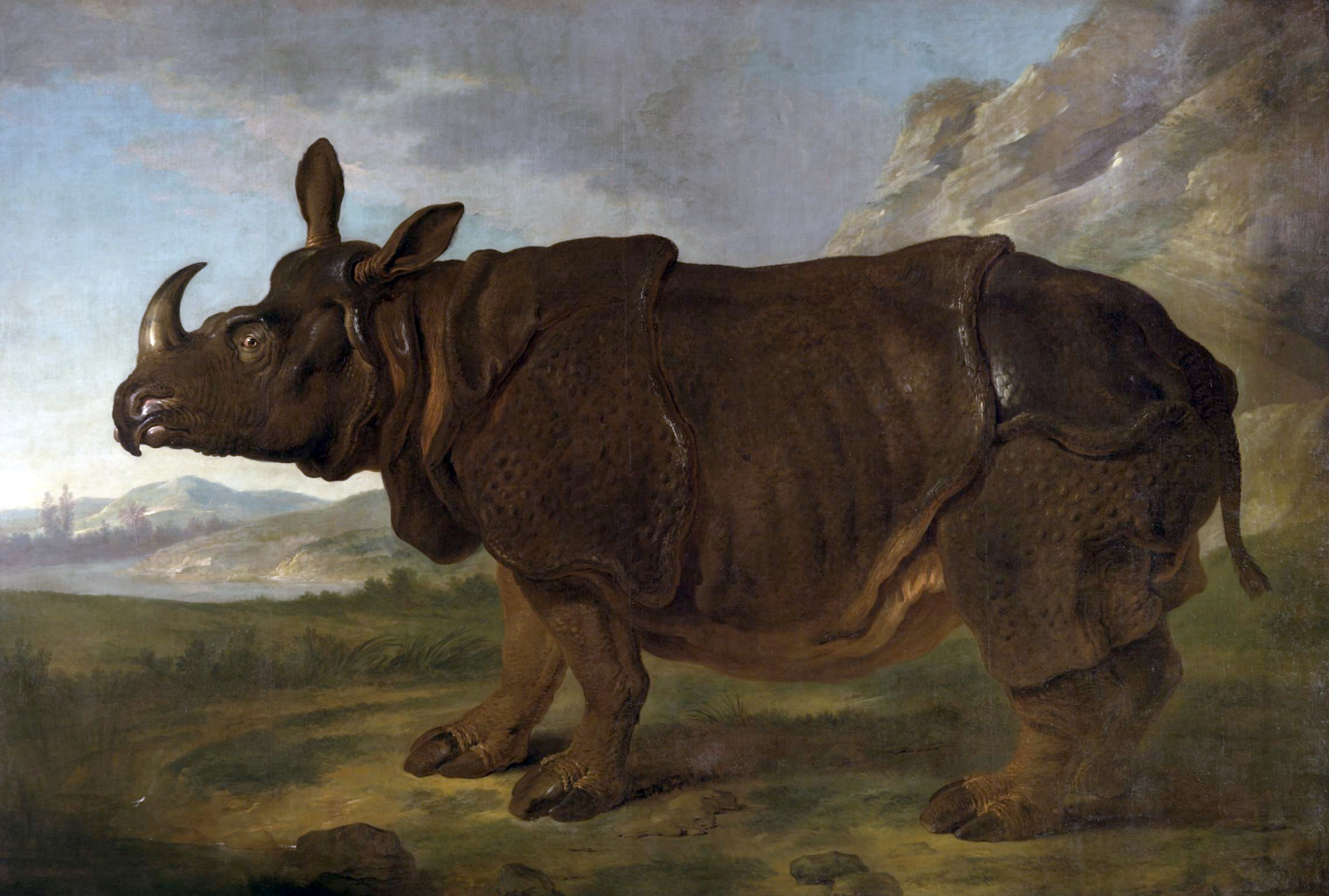
Jean-Baptiste Oudry: Clara, 1749. 310 x 456 cm

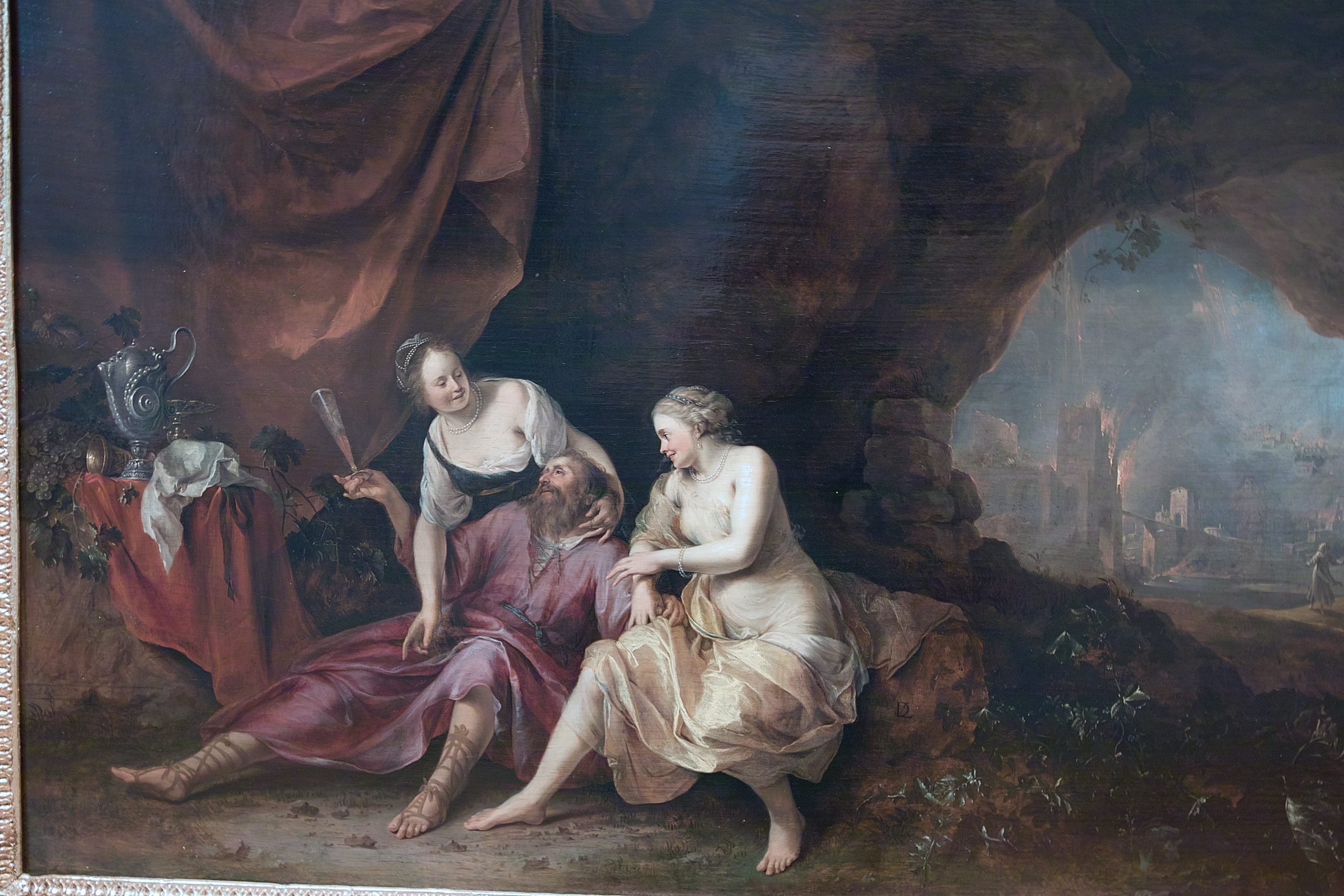
Dirck van der Lisse: Lot und seine Töchter

== Bibliography ==
- Karin Annette Möller: Porzellan aus Fürstenberg. Katalog, Schwerin 2002, ISBN 3-86106-073-6
