= Hruševje =

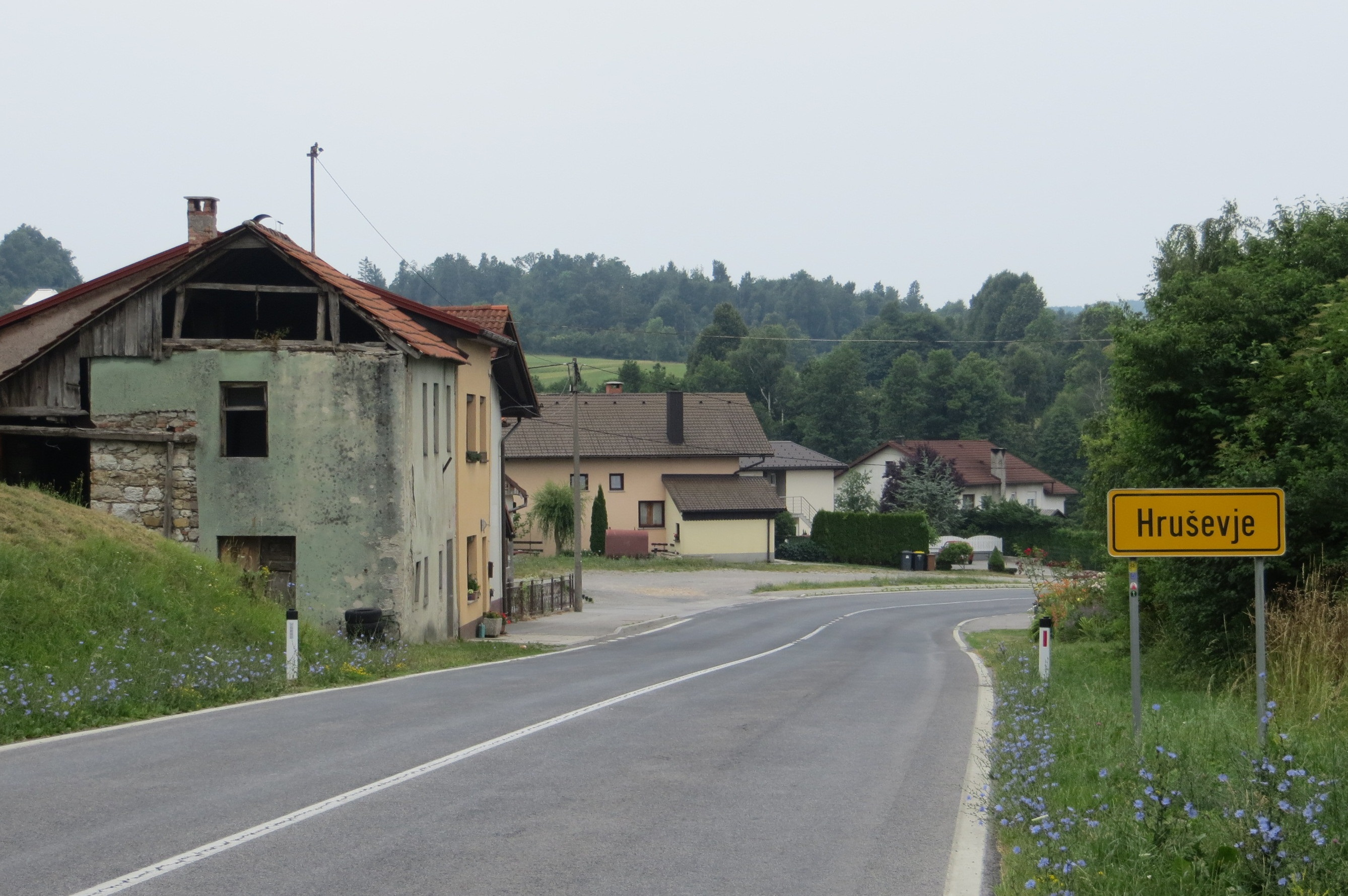

- Location in Slovenia
- Coordinates: 45°45′44.89″N 14°6′59.51″E
- Country: Slovenia
- Traditional region: Inner Carniola
- Statistical region: Littoral–Inner Carniola
- Municipality: Postojna

Area
  - Total: 3.35 km^{2} (1.29 sq mi)
- Elevation: 562.8 m (1,846 ft)

Population (2018)
  - Total: 266

Hruševje (pronounced [ˈxɾuːʃɛu̯jɛ]; Italian: Cruscevie) is a settlement west of Postojna in the Inner Carniola region of Slovenia.

== Geography ==
Hruševje stands in the western part of the Pivka Basin along the old main road from Razdrto to Postojna. The older part of the village stands on a hill topped by the village church, and the newer part, where houses were built after the Second World War, stands along the old main road.

== Businesses and services ==
The settlement has several restaurants, including a bar, a typical restaurant, and a pizzeria (with an electric vehicle charging station). It also has a fire station and a post office. Bicycle manufacturer Liv Kolesa has a plastic processing plant in the settlement. Across the street from the plant is a primary school.

== Church ==
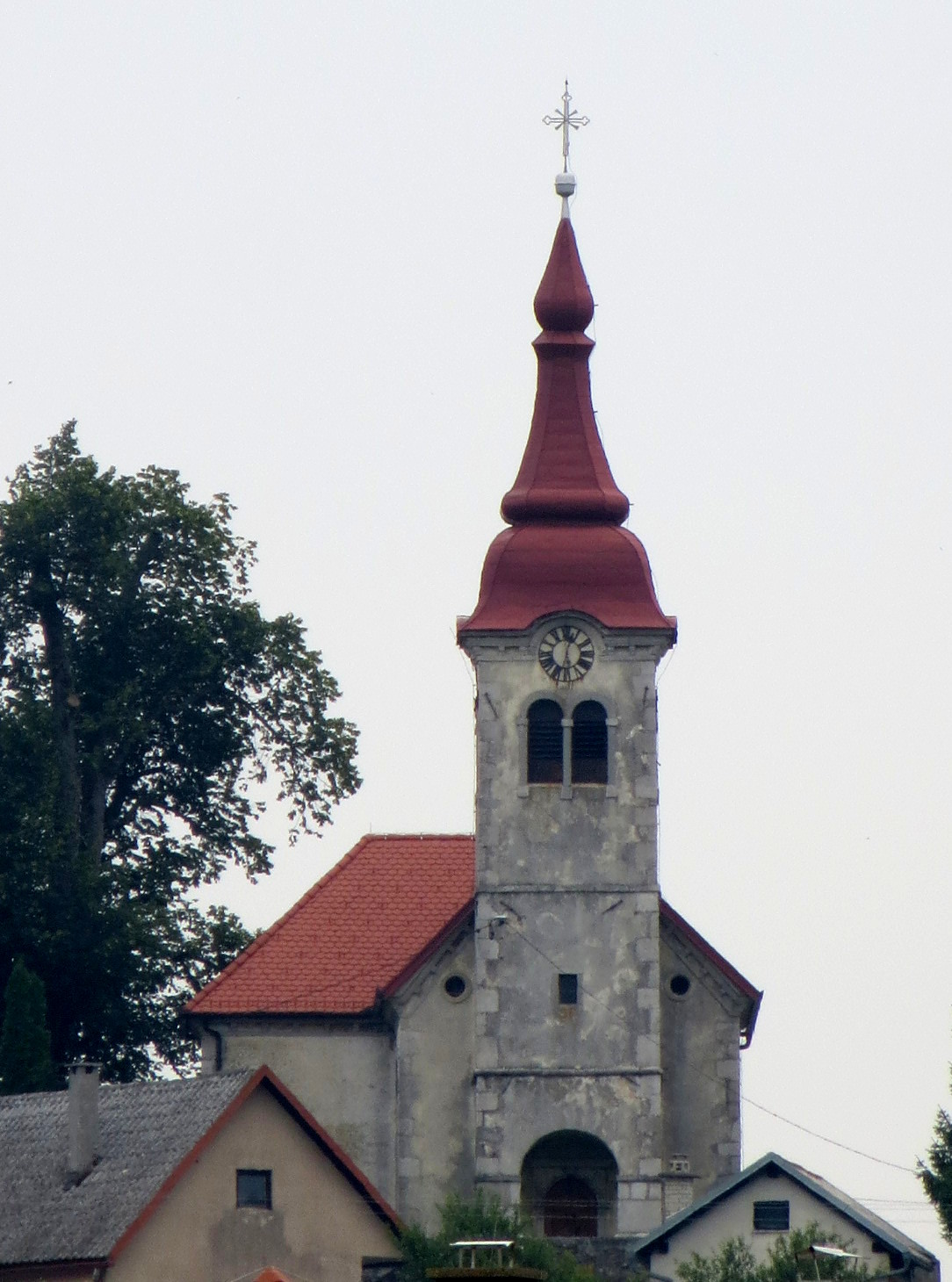
Prophet Daniel Church

The church in Hruševje is dedicated to the Prophet Daniel. It stands on a hill in the center of the village. It is an early Baroque structure with a rectangular nave ending in a chancel of equal width walled on three sides. The entrance bears the years 1633 and 1888. The bell tower is topped with an elongated onion dome and was built in 1793.
