= Francisco Leonardoni =

Italian painter (1654–1711)

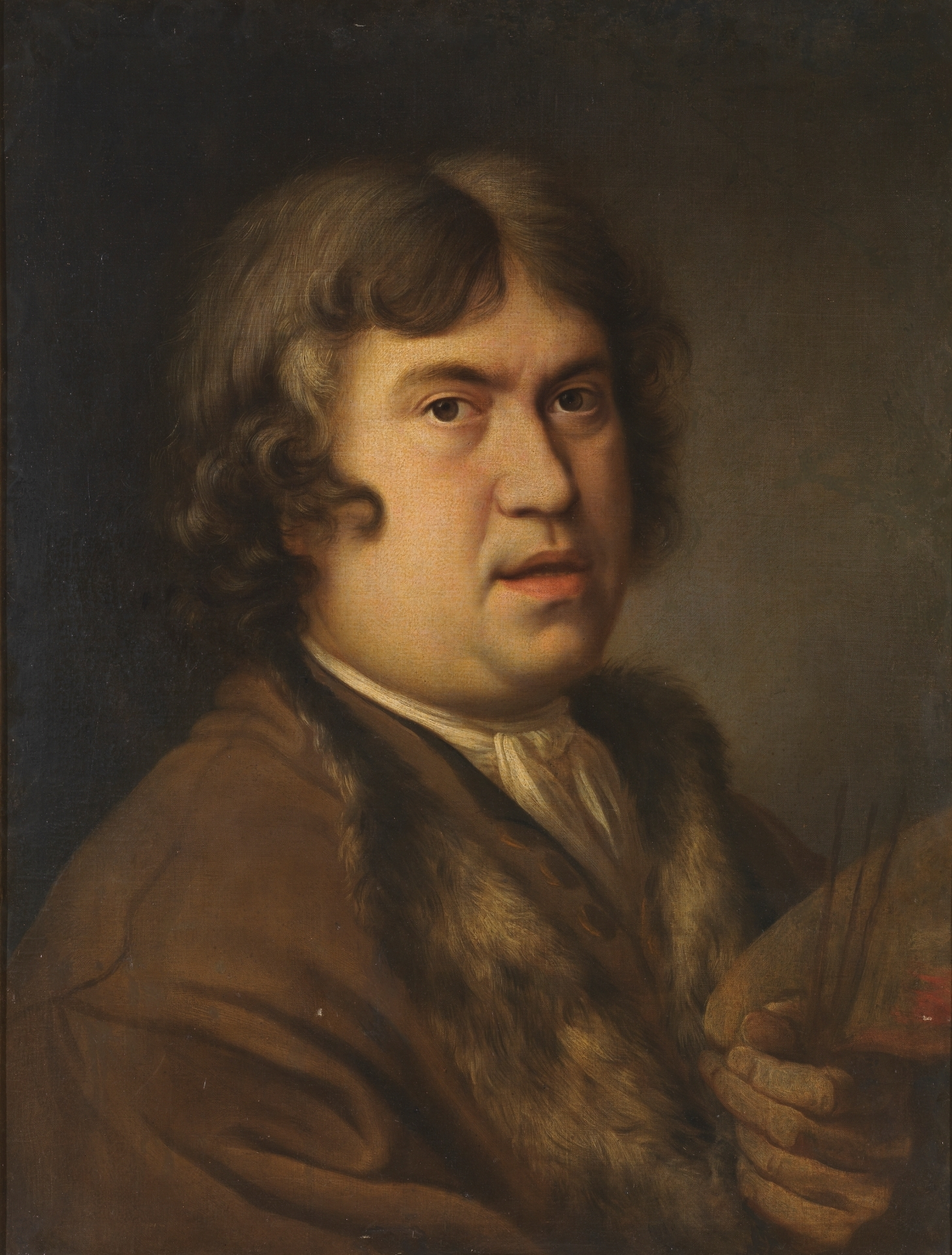
Self Portrait, oil on canvas, in the collection of the Museo del Prado, Madrid

Francisco (Francesco) Leonardoni (1654–1711) was an Italian painter of the Baroque period, active mainly in Spain.

He was born in Venice, where he studied but was forced to leave the republic and travelled through various parts of Europe, till he settled at Madrid in 1680. There he distinguished himself by his portrait miniatures, although he also painted several pictures for the churches. In June 1694, after the death of Claudio Coello, he became the painter for Queen Mariana of Neuburg. For the church of the Convent of Atocha at Madrid he painted a Marriage and Death of St. Joseph and in the church of San Gerónimo el Real, a large altar-piece of the Annunciation. He also restored the Transfiguration, a large altar at the Salvador church in Leganés which was completed in 1702. He died in Madrid.
