= Young Man in a Fur Cap =

Painting by Carel Fabritius

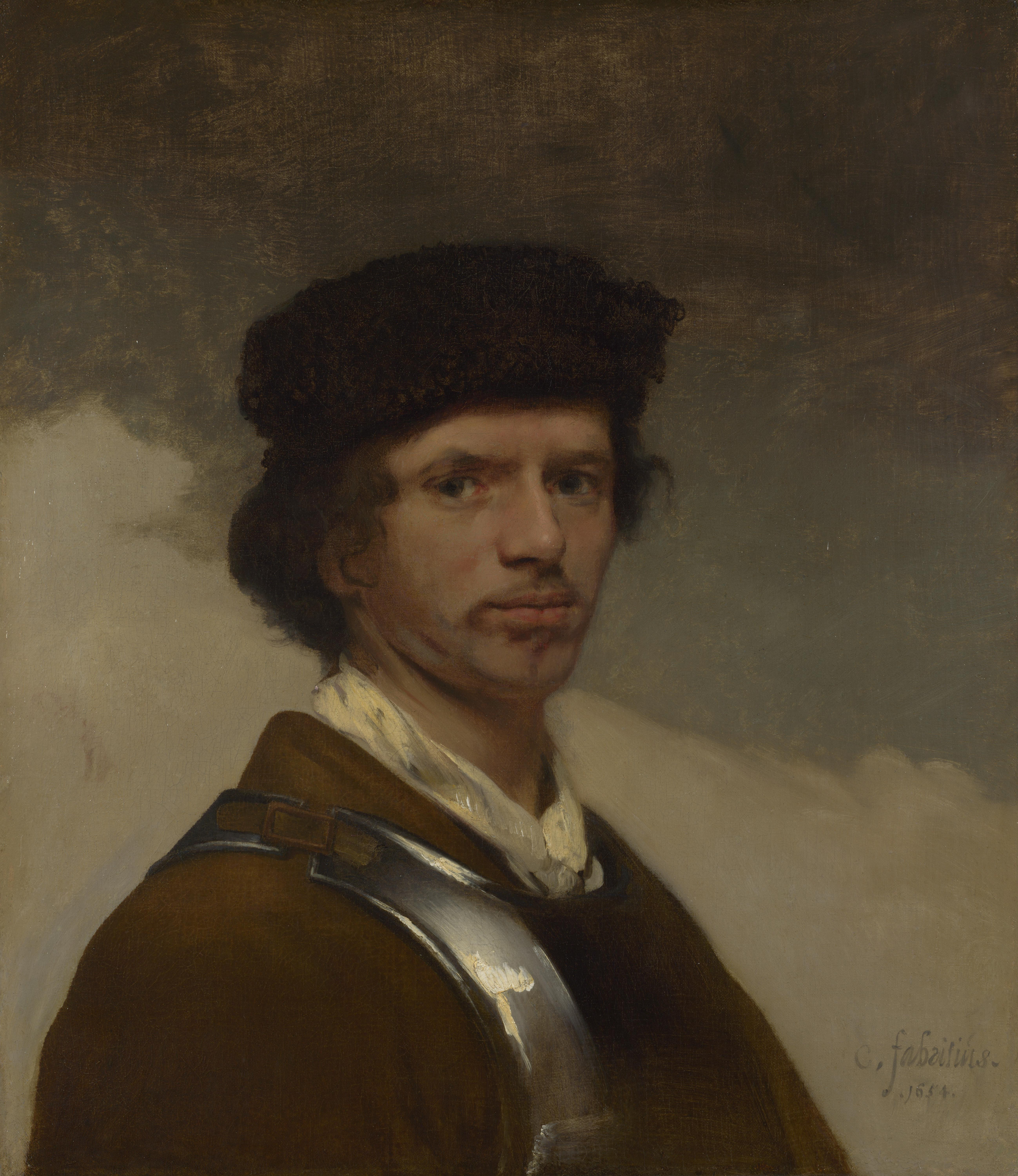
- Year: 1654
- Type: Portrait painting
- Medium: Oil on canvas
- Dimensions: 70.5 cm × 61.5 cm (27.8 in × 24.2 in)
- Location: National Gallery; London, UK

A Young Man in a Fur Cap and a Cuirass (probably a Self Portrait) is a 1654 portrait painting by Carel Fabritius. It is an oil painting on canvas of 70.5 by 61.5 cm (27.8 by 24.2 in). The painting is generally considered to be a self-portrait. The work has been in the collection of the National Gallery in London since 1924.
