= Samson and Delilah (Guercino) =

Painting by Guercino

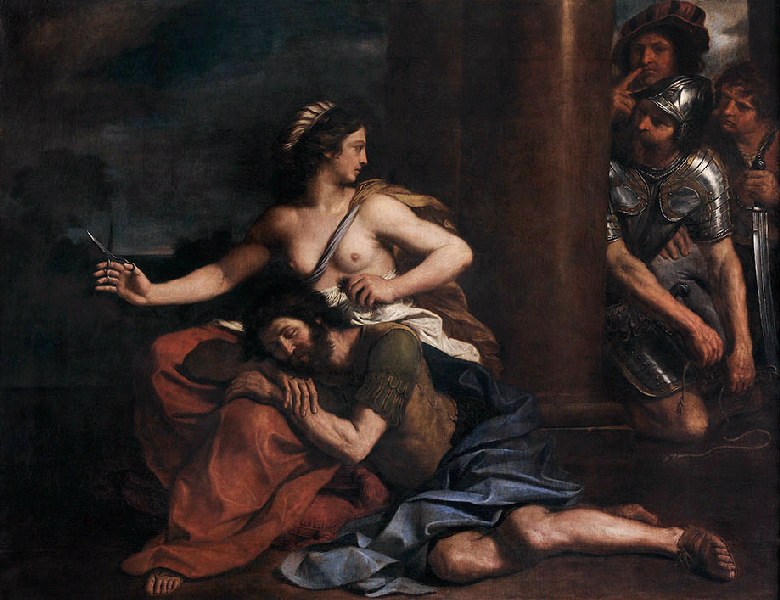
- Artist: Guercino
- Year: 1654
- Medium: oil painting on canvas
- Movement: Classicism; History painting
- Subject: Samson and Delilah
- Dimensions: 176 cm × 223 cm (69 in × 88 in)
- Location: Musée des Beaux-Arts, Strasbourg
- Accession: 1893

Samson and Delilah is a 1654 painting by the Italian Baroque painter Giovanni Francesco Barbieri (il Guercino). It is on display in the Musée des Beaux-Arts of Strasbourg, France. Its inventory number is 316.

This work (and its pendant Lot and his Daughters, today in the Louvre), was painted in 1654 for Charles II, Duke of Mantua and Montferrat, and delivered in 1657. It was sold between 1715 and 1720 and later belonged to John Charles Robinson. Robinson presented it to the Strasbourg museum in 1893, as gesture of friendship towards its director, Wilhelm von Bode, who had purchased several items from his collection. [The accession date was given as 1896 in previous publications.]

Contrary to the Biblical narrative in the Book of Judges, but according to the retelling by Josephus in Antiquities of the Jews, Delilah is shown as cutting Samson's hair herself (in the Bible, a man is summoned to do this task). The severity of the composition, the muted colors, and Delilah's sculptural profile, are characteristic of Guercino's late, classical manner. The theme of the painting and of its pendant, Lot and his daughters, does furthermore constitute a warning against the dangers of drunkenness.

A preparatory drawing (current location unknown) depicts Delilah at half-length, with a more girlish expression and a less athletic build.
