= Hruševka =

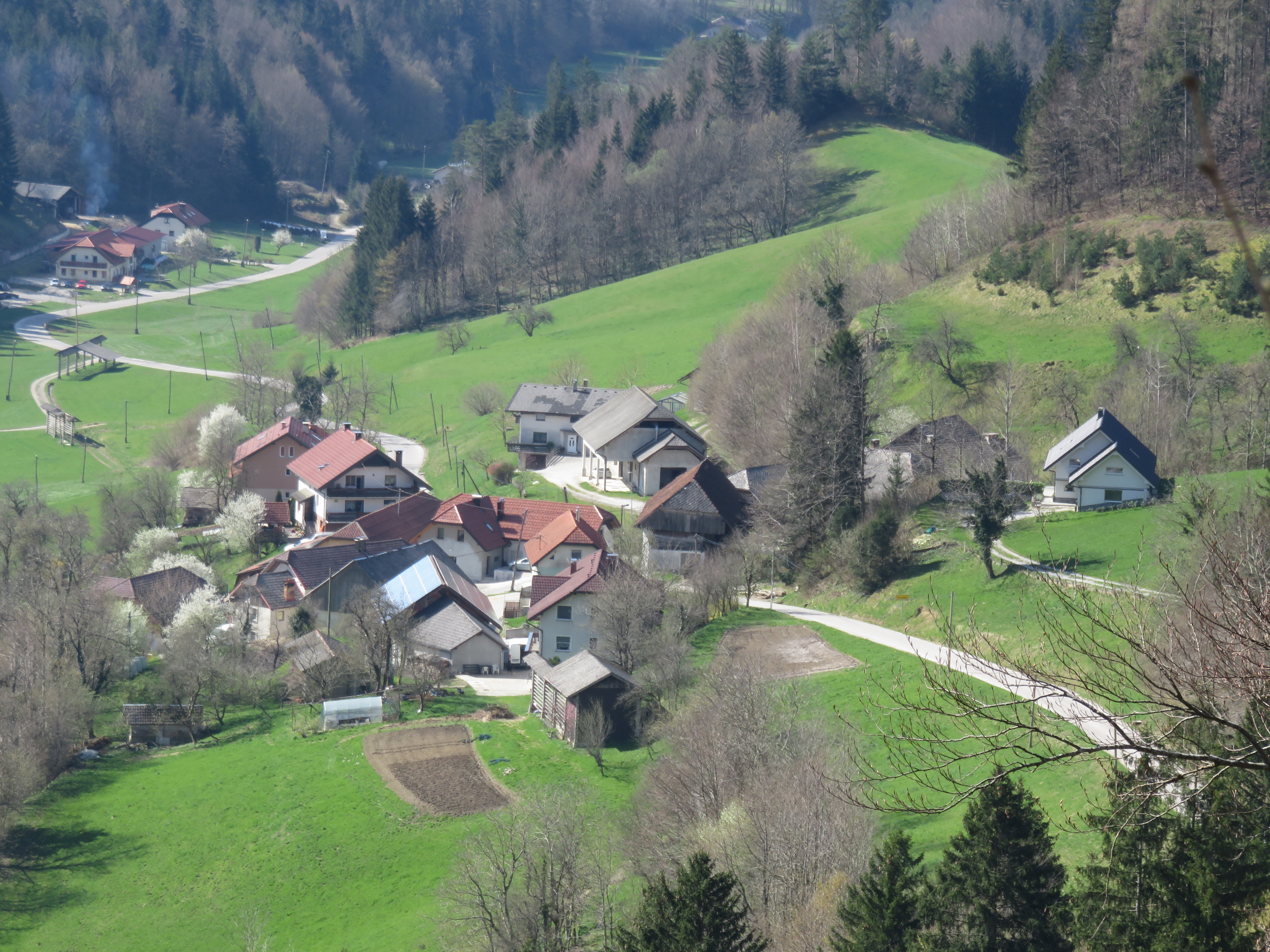

- Location in Slovenia
- Coordinates: 46°13′49.95″N 14°43′22.61″E
- Country: Slovenia
- Traditional region: Upper Carniola
- Statistical region: Central Slovenia
- Municipality: Kamnik
- Elevation: 527.4 m (1,730 ft)

Population (2002)
  - Total: 33

Hruševka (pronounced [ˈxɾuːʃɛu̯ka]; German: Hruschouka) is a small settlement in the Tuhinj Valley in the Municipality of Kamnik in the Upper Carniola region of Slovenia.
