= The Sentry (Fabritius) =

1654 painting by Carel Fabritius

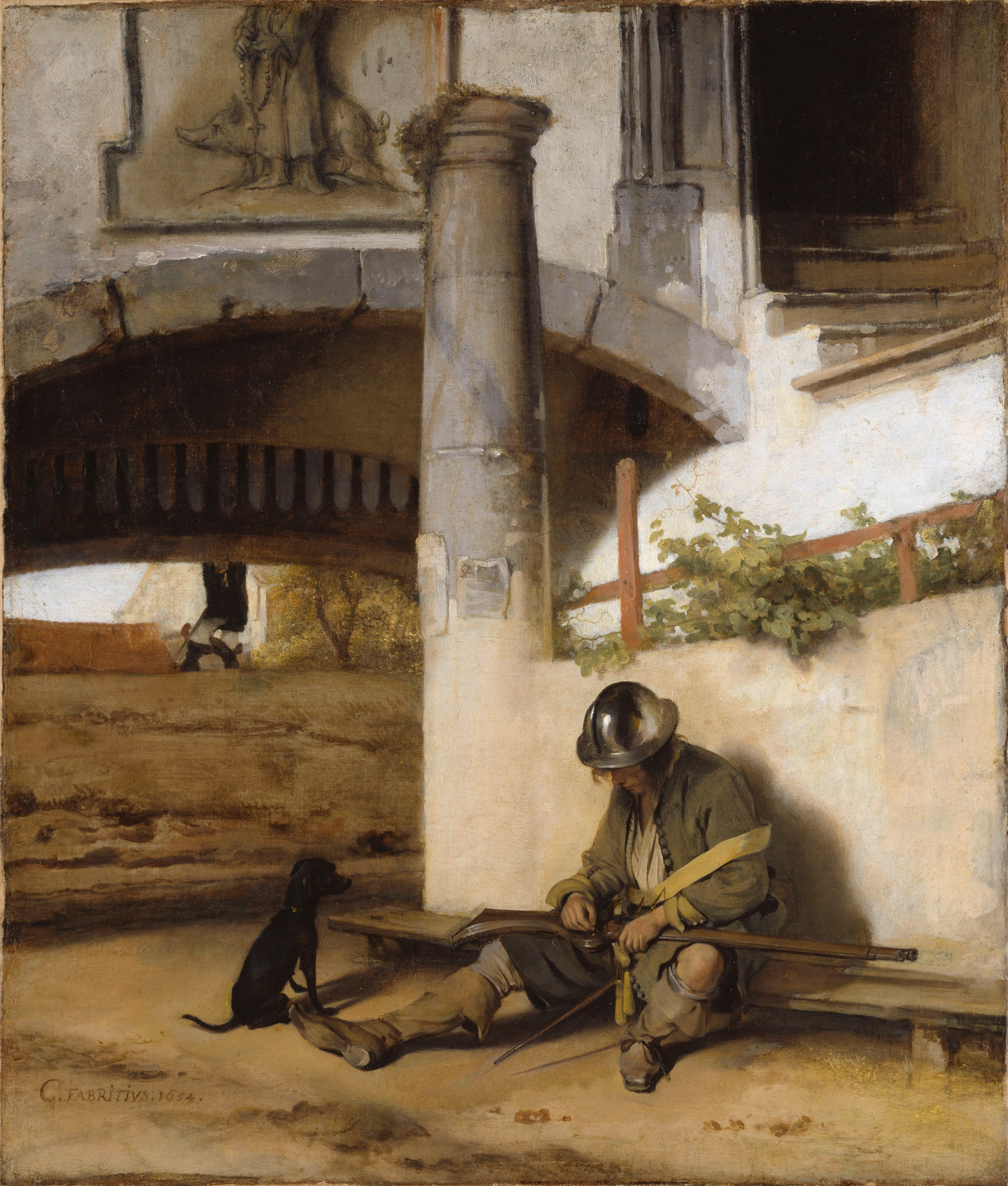
- Artist: Carel Fabritius
- Year: 1654
- Medium: Oil on canvas
- Dimensions: 68 cm × 58 cm (27 in × 23 in)
- Location: Staatliches Museum Schwerin; Schwerin, Germany

The Sentry is an oil-on-canvas painting by Dutch artist Carel Fabritius, created in 1654. Its dimensions are 68 by 58 cm (27 by 23 in). The work is in the collection of the Staatliches Museum in Schwerin. It represents a resting sentry and a dog.

The painting was cleaned in 2004. During this treatment, old overpainting dating to the eighteenth century or earlier was removed, revealing a second soldier whose legs are visible below the arch at left. In 2005, the art historian Bart Cornelis wrote: "Although the painting looks brilliant after treatment, one cannot help feeling that part of its charm has gone, now that the splendid isolation of the soldier has been lost by the sudden appearance of another soldier .... Whoever overpainted this detail at such an early stage in the picture's history seemed to have understood that he could actually strengthen the composition."

Art historian Laura Cumming writes, "The Sentry is the most enigmatic of Fabritius's scant few works.... This is a public painting of inward emotion; a civic guard with a private mind.... He might be a deserter, outsider or anti-hero. Fabritius withholds his story, almost to the point of abstraction".
