= Carel Fabritius =

Dutch painter (1622–1654)

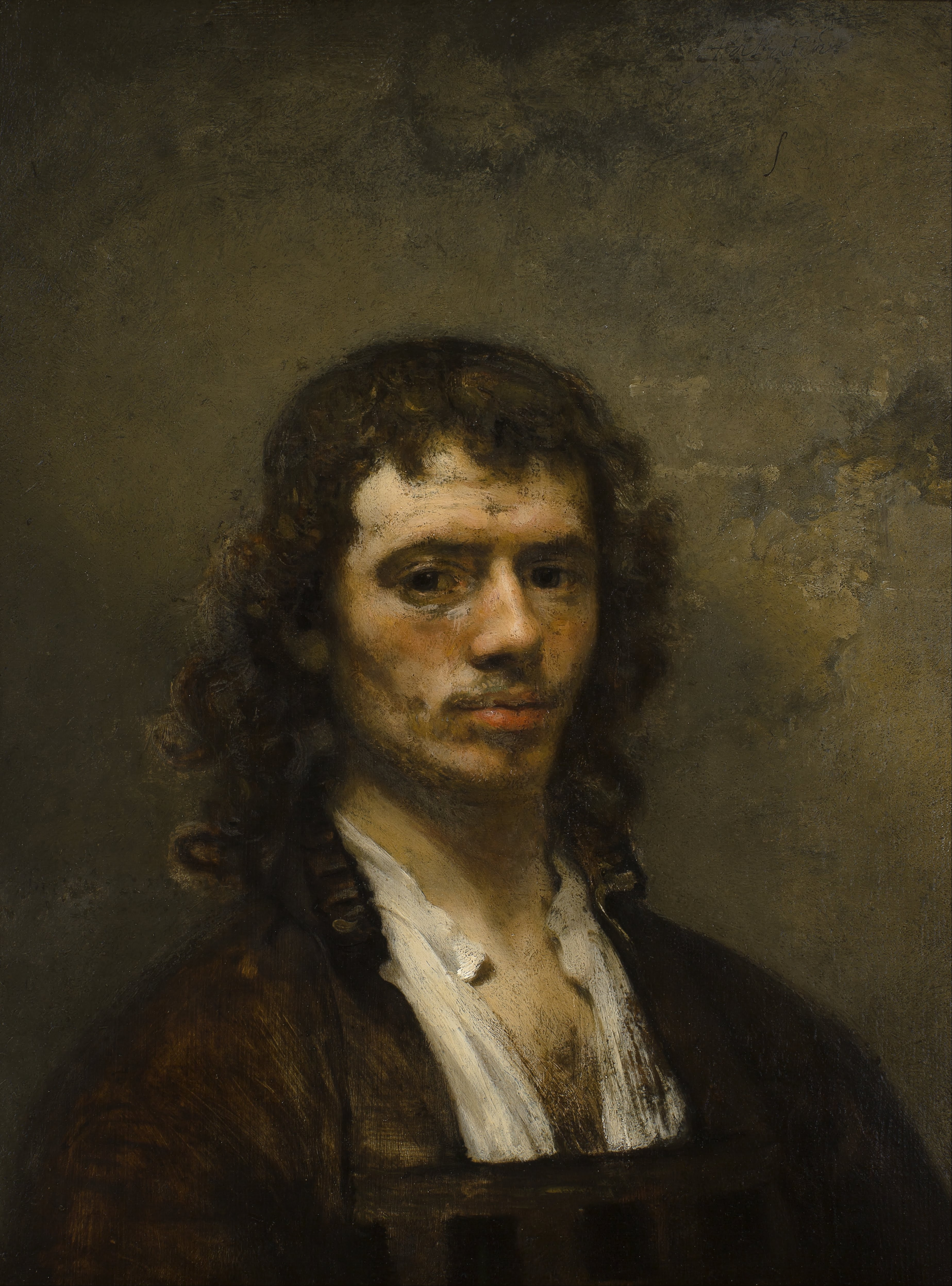
- Self-portrait (c. 1645)
- Born: Carel Pietersz. Fabritius; Middenbeemster, Dutch Republic
- Baptised: 27 February 1622
- Died: 12 October 1654 (aged 32); Delft, Dutch Republic
- Education: Rembrandt
- Notable work: A View of Delft (1652); The Goldfinch (1654); The Sentry (1654)
- Movement: Delft School; Dutch Golden Age Painting
- Spouses: Aeltge Velthuys (m. 1641; died 1643) Agatha van Pruyssen (m. 1650)

Carel Pieterszoon (abbr. Pietersz.) Fabritius (Dutch pronunciation: [ˈkaːrəl ˈpitərs faːˈbritsijʏs]; bapt. 27 February 1622 – 12 October 1654) was a Dutch painter. He was a pupil of Rembrandt and worked in his studio in Amsterdam. Fabritius, who was a member of the Delft School, developed his own artistic style and experimented with perspective and lighting. Among his works are A View of Delft (1652; National Gallery, London), The Goldfinch (1654), and The Sentry (1654).

== Biography ==
Carel Pietersz. Fabritius was born in February 1622 in Middenbeemster, a village in the ten-year-old Beemster polder in the Dutch Republic, and was baptized on 27 February of that year. He was the son of Pieter Carelsz. Fabritius, a painter, church sexton and schoolteacher, and Barbertje van der Maes. He had two younger brothers, Barent and Johannes, who also became painters.

Initially he worked as a carpenter (Latin: fabritius). In 1641 he entered the Dutch Reformed Church and in September of that year married his neighbour Aeltge Velthuys, who died after complications of childbirth in 1643. He also lost his twin children (born in 1642) and newborn daughter Catrina the same year as his wife. In the early 1640s he studied at Rembrandt's studio in Amsterdam, along with his brother Barent. In 1650 he married the widow Agatha van Pruyssen and he moved to Delft, and joined the Delft painters' guild in 1652. Due to his financial difficulties he accepted 12 guilders from the Delft city council for painting two Delft coats of arms.

Fabritius died at the age of 32, caught in the explosion of the Delft gunpowder magazine on 12 October 1654, which destroyed a quarter of the city, along with his home studio and most of his life's work of paintings. The explosion, having taken place in the Doelenkwartier district across the lane from the studio situated on the adjacent Doelenstraat, caused the roof and walls to collapse upon him as he worked at his easel burying him under the rubble for six hours. He was brought out alive but seriously injured with crush syndrome and blast trauma; he died shortly afterwards in the makeshift infirmary and was buried 48 hours later in the Oude Kerk. Only about a dozen paintings have survived. The Goldfinch painting was found intact amongst the ruins. According to Houbraken, his student Mattias Spoors and the church deacon Simon Decker were killed alongside him, since they were working on a portrait of Decker at the time.

In a poem written by Arnold Bon to his memory, he is called Karel Faber.

== Painting ==
Of all Rembrandt's pupils, Fabritius was the only one to develop his own artistic style. A typical Rembrandt portrait would have a plain dark background with the subject defined by spotlighting. In contrast, Fabritius's portraits feature delicately lit subjects against light-coloured, textured backgrounds. Moving away from the Renaissance focus on iconography, Fabritius became interested in the technical aspects of painting. He used cool colour harmonies to create shape in a luminous style of painting.

Fabritius was also interested in complex spatial effects, as can be seen in the exaggerated perspective of A View of Delft, with a Musical Instrument Seller's Stall (1652). He also showed excellent control of a heavily loaded brush, as in The Goldfinch (1654). All these qualities appear in the work of Vermeer and de Hooch, both also based in Delft; it is likely that Fabritius was a strong influence on them.

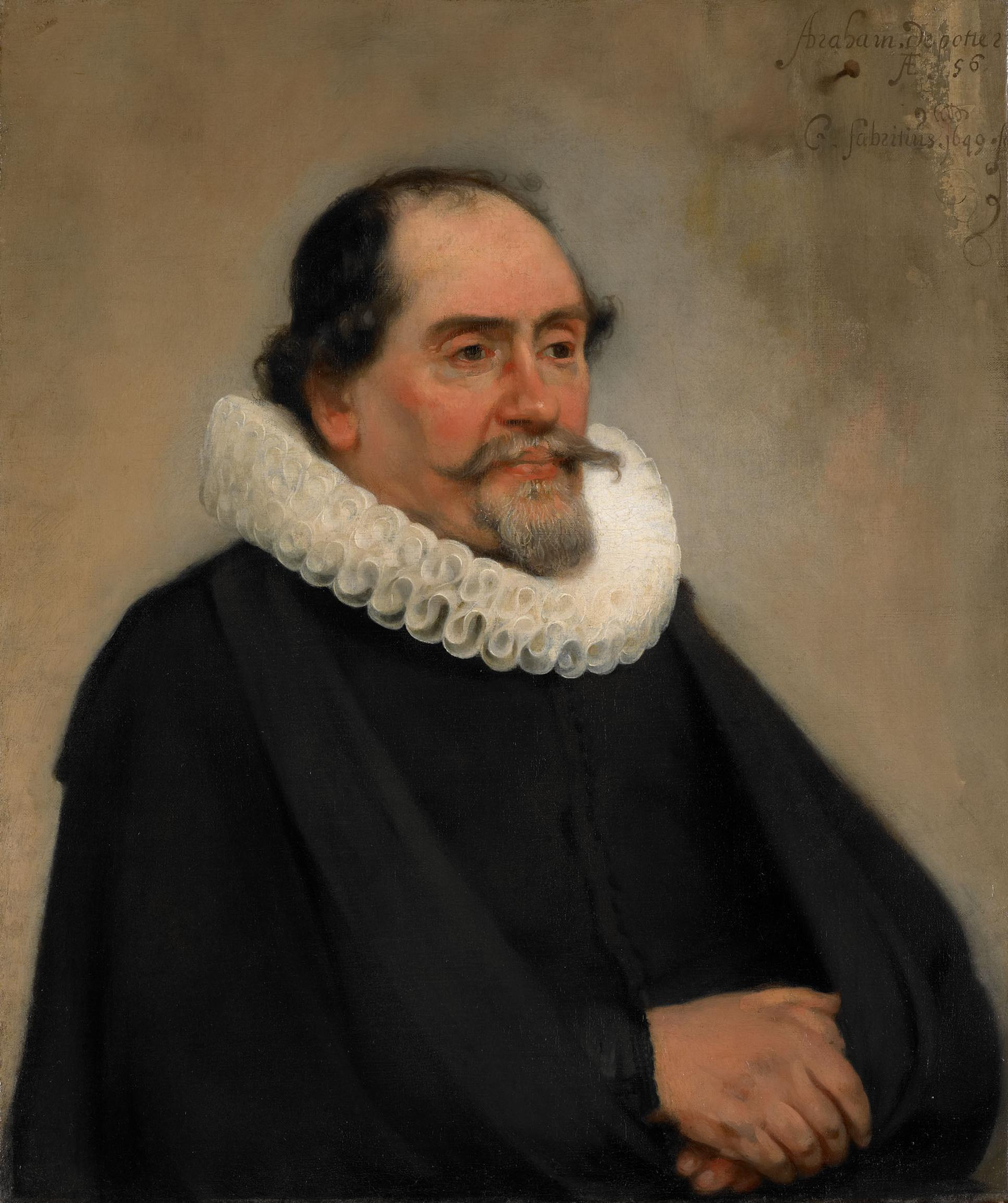
Portrait of Abraham de Potter (1649)

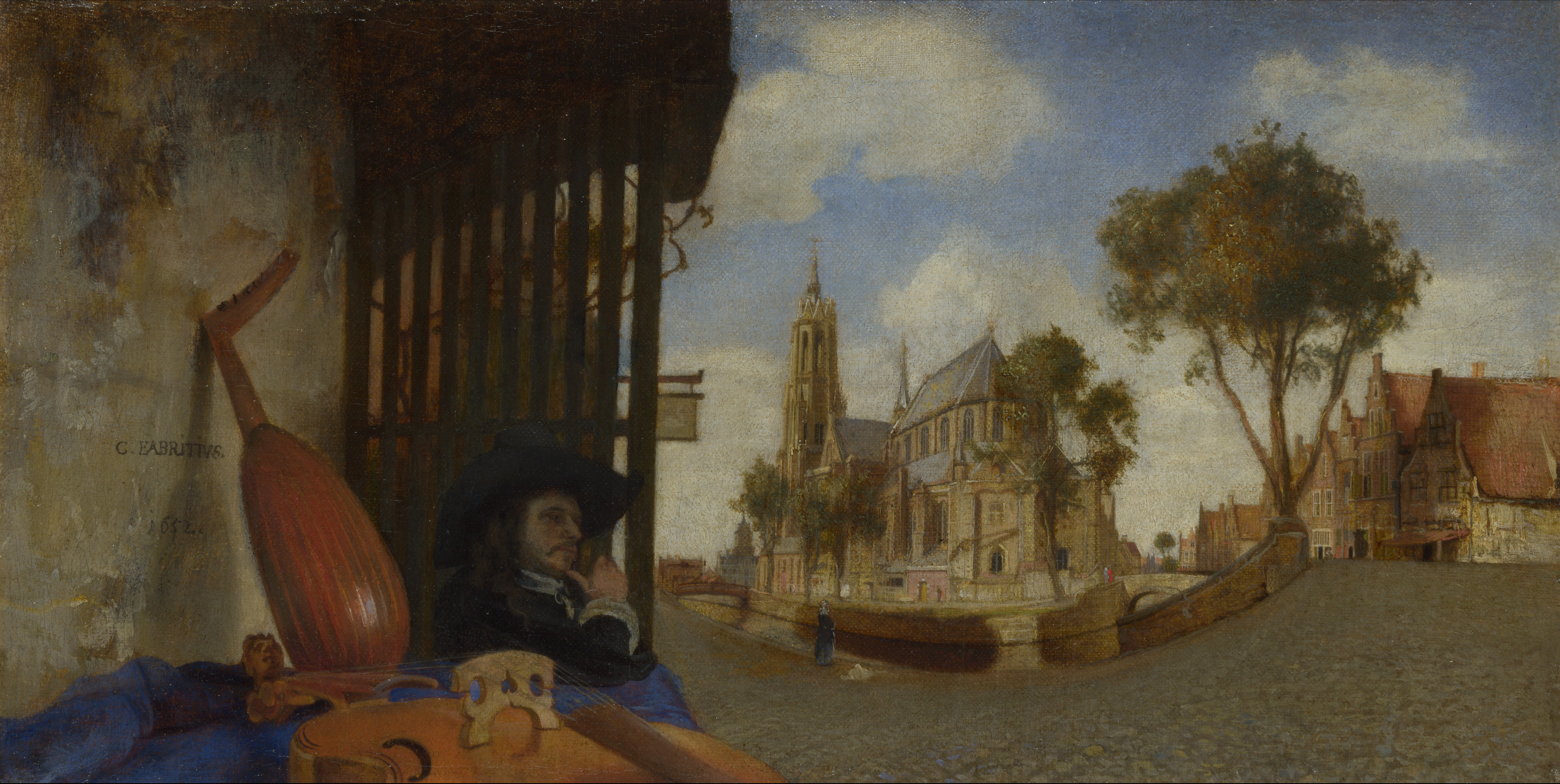
A View of Delft (1652) exploring an exaggerated, panoramic perspective

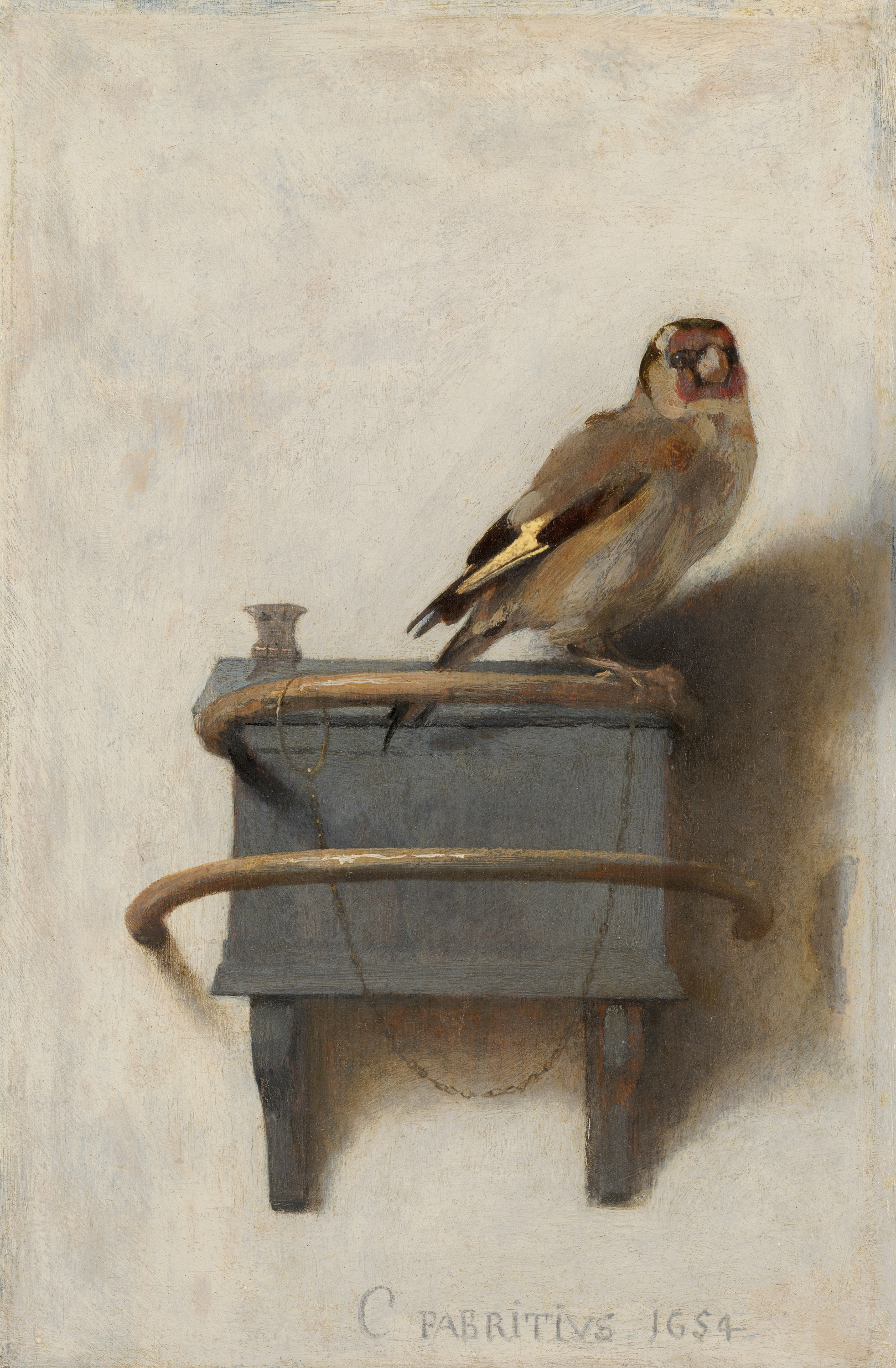
The Goldfinch (1654), showing Fabritius's use of cool colour harmonies, delicate lighting effects, and a light background

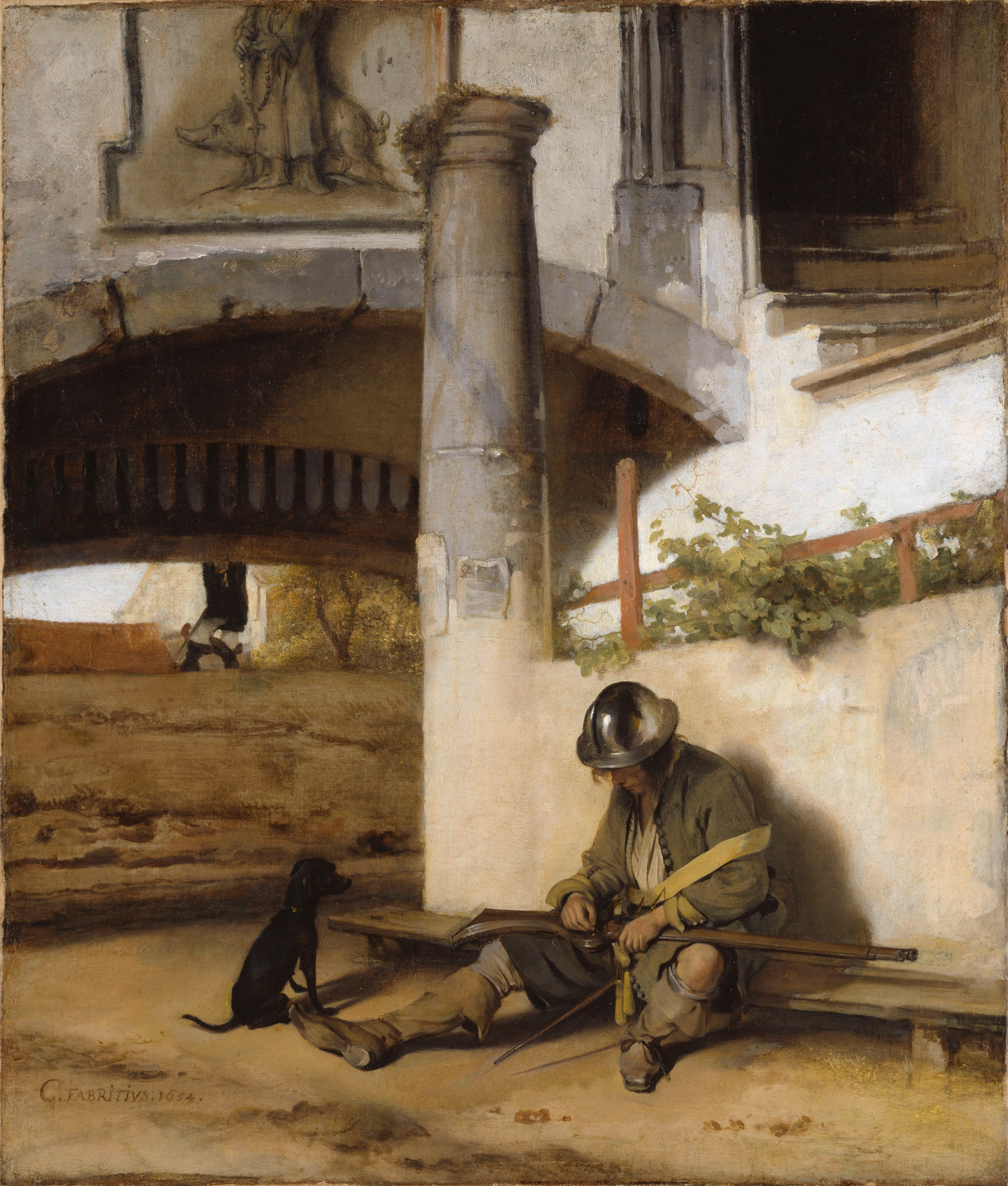
The Sentry (1654)

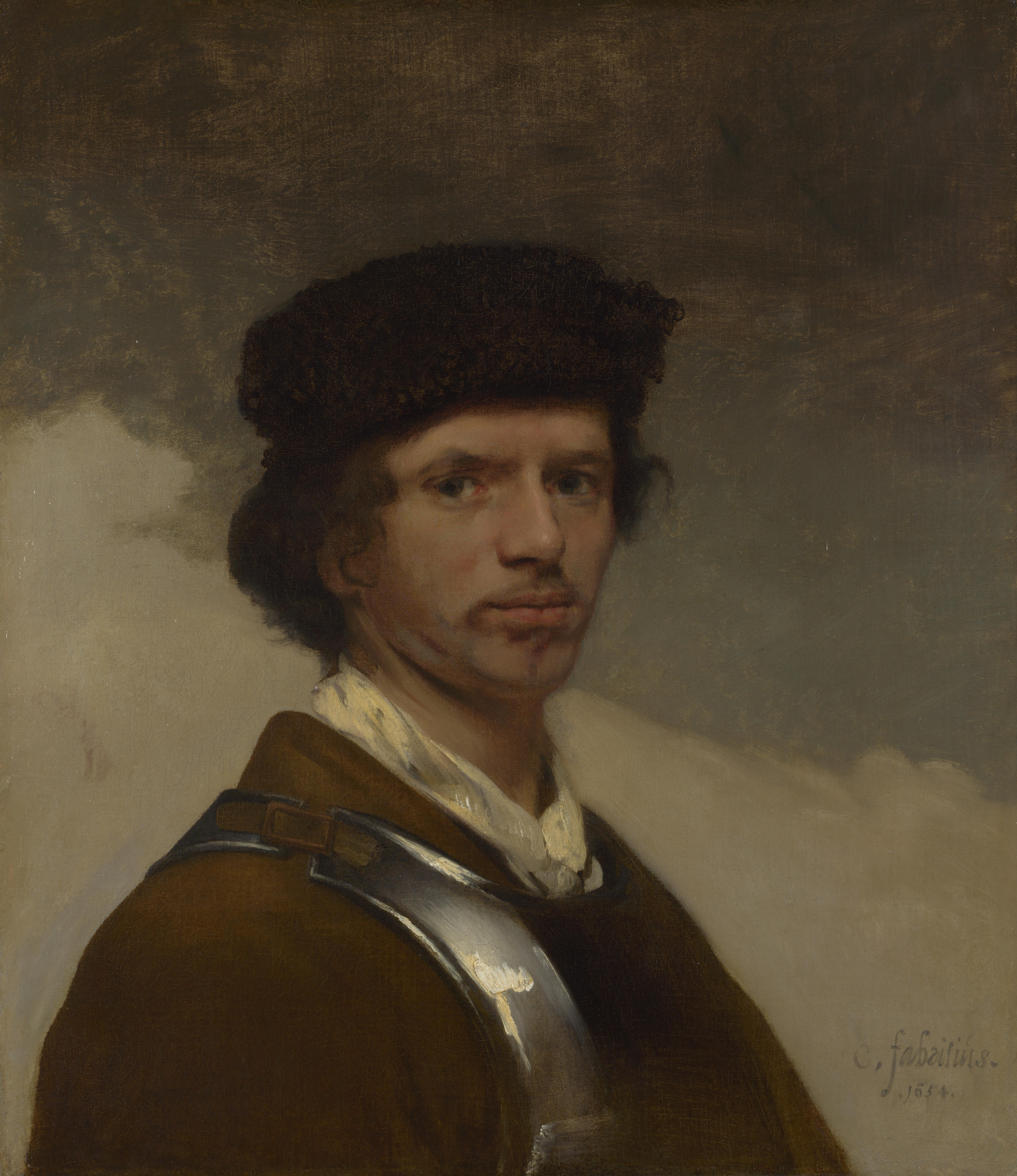
Young Man in a Fur Cap (1654), probably a self-portrait

== List of works ==
- c. 1640 The Beheading of John the Baptist, oil on canvas, 149 x 121 cm, Rijksmuseum Amsterdam
- 1643 The Raising of Lazarus, oil on canvas, National Museum, Warsaw
- 1643 Hera Hiding During the Battle Between the Gods and the Giants, oil on canvas, Pushkin Museum, Moscow
- 1643/45 Hagar and the Angel, oil on canvas, 157.5 x 136 cm, The Leiden Collection New York
- c. 1644 Portrait of a Seated Woman with a Handkerchief, Art Gallery of Ontario, Toronto
- c. 1645 Self-portrait, oil on panel, 65 x 49 cm, Museum Boijmans Van Beuningen, Rotterdam
- 1645–47 Mercury and Aglauros oil on canvas, 72.4 x 91.1 cm, Museum of Fine Arts Boston
- 1646–1651 A Girl with a Broom, oil on canvas, 107.3 x 91.4 cm, signed as Rembrandt, National Gallery of Art, Washington D.C
- 1649 Portrait of Abraham de Potter, oil on canvas, 68.5 x 57 cm, Rijksmuseum, Amsterdam
- 1652 A View of Delft, with a Musical Instrument Seller's Stall, oil on canvas on panel, 15.4 x 31.6 cm, National Gallery London
- 1654 The Goldfinch, oil on panel, Mauritshuis The Hague
- 1654 The Sentry, oil on canvas, 68 x 58 cm, Staatliches Museum Schwerin Schwerin
- 1654 Young Man in a Fur Cap, oil on canvas, 70.5 x 61.5 cm, National Gallery London (probably a self-portrait)
