= A View of Delft =

1652 painting by Carel Fabritius

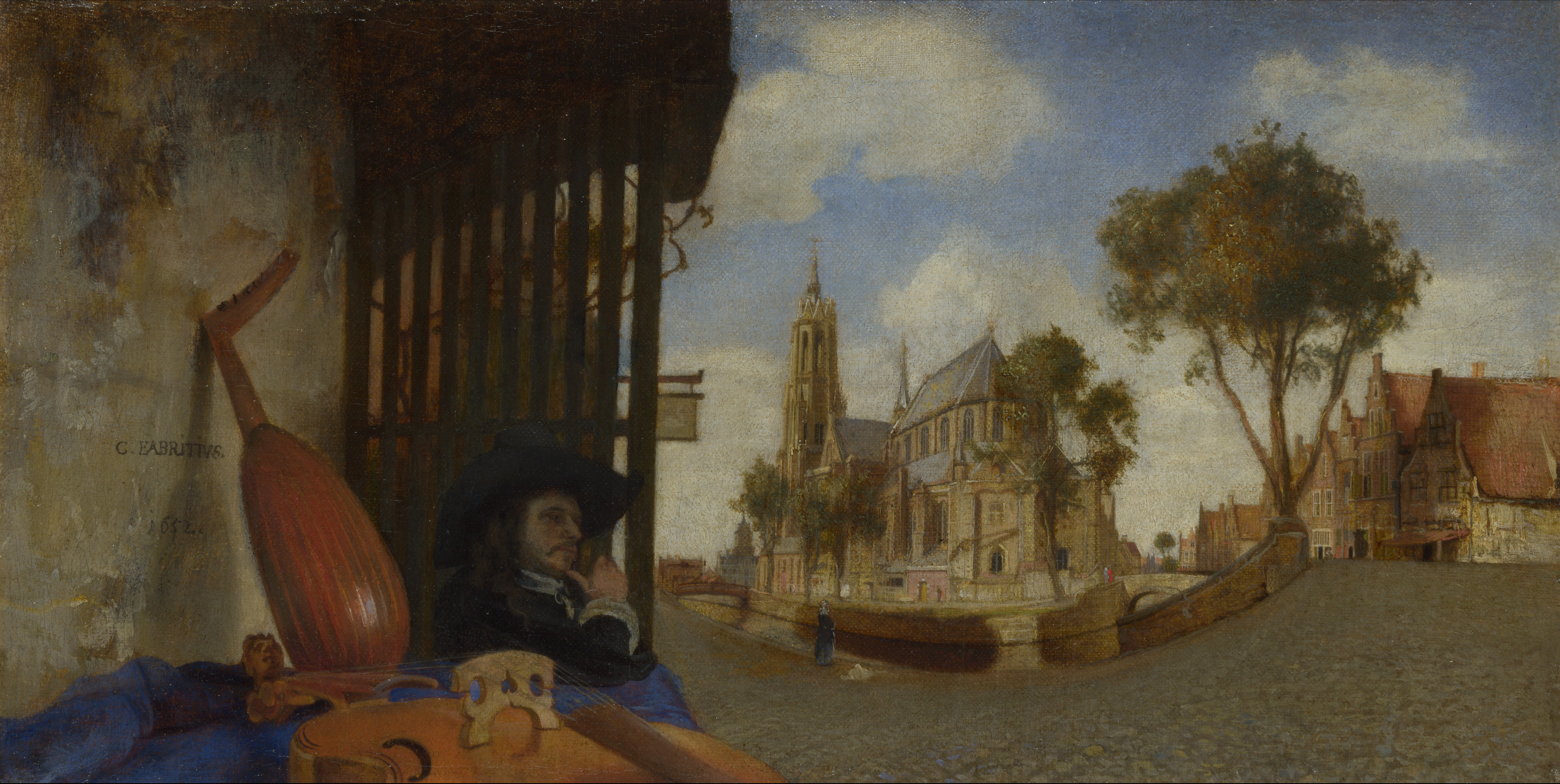
- Artist: Carel Fabritius
- Year: 1652
- Medium: Oil on canvas
- Dimensions: 20.9 cm × 35.7 cm (8.2 in × 14.1 in)
- Location: National Gallery; London

A View of Delft, with a Musical Instrument Seller's Stall is a 1652 painting by Carel Fabritius. It is an oil painting on canvas of 20.9 by 35.7 cm (8.2 by 14.1 in) of a cityscape of Delft. The work has been in the collection of the National Gallery in London since 1922. The unusual perspective distortion, especially visible to the right of the church, suggests that it may have been intended to have been displayed on a curved surface at the back of a perspective box (and viewed through a peephole,) hence making an illusion of anamorphosis. Fabritius is mentioned in contemporary documents in connection with perspective boxes. The view is of the Nieuwe Kerk facing the Town Hall and several houses, one of which is still extant, at the point where the Oude Langendijk canal meets the Vrouwenrecht. The size of the canvas, exceptionally small for a cityscape of its kind, also supports the perspective-box hypothesis. Another possibility is that Fabritius designed the picture with the aid of a double-convex lens, as these may create distorted proportions in a pattern akin to those seen in the painting. However, material analyses carried out during conservation strengthen the possibility of the perspective-box view.

It is likely that the body of the viol at bottom left would have been completed by a separate painted piece within the perspective box. Walter Liedtke suggests that the resulting composition, viewed from the peephole, would have made the viol and the choir of the Nieuwe Kerk approximately the same size, thus juxtaposing the sacred space of the church with the world of the senses represented by the musical instruments. The lute, one of which is depicted to the left of the instrument seller, commonly appeared in treatises on perspective, such as that of Albrecht Dürer as a demonstration of how to project irregular, rounded shapes onto flat surfaces; thus it may demonstrate a certain self-awareness of technical skill by the painter. The Nieuwe Kerk in Delft is also notable for containing the tomb monuments of William the Silent and later Princes of Orange; the church was therefore a site with distinct political meaning in the 17th century and thereafter.
