= Michelangelo Ricciolino =

Italian painter (1654–1715)

Michelangelo Ricciolino (1654–1715) was an Italian painter of the Baroque period.

He was born at Rome, and is noticed by Abate Titi, including paintings he made for the church of S. Lorenzo in Piscibus, and a ceiling in Santa Maria in Campitelli. His self-portrait is in the Florentine Gallery (Uffizi). He died at Rome.
