= Postma =

Postma is a surname of Frisian origin. In 2007 there were 12,395 people in the Netherlands with the surname, most concentrated in the province of Friesland. The form Postema (2,069 people) is more common in the neighboring province of Groningen. The surname's origin may be in "posthumous" (a child born after the death of his father), occupational (mailman, guard) or toponymic (from an outpost, etc.). People with the name include:

- Angela Postma (born 1971), Dutch swimmer
- Anni Friesinger-Postma (born 1977), German speed skater, married to Ids
- Antoon Postma (1929–2016), Dutch anthropologist
- Dirk Postma (1818–1890), Dutch Reformed minister
- Dirkje Postma (born 1951), Dutch pathophysiologist
- Elma Postma (born 1978), South African actress and presenter
- Erik Postma (1953–2002), Dutch mayor
- Ferdinand Postma (1879–1950), South African academic and writer
- Gerriet Postma (1932–2009), Dutch painter
- Herman Postma (1933–2004), American scientist and educator
- Ids Postma (born 1973), Dutch speed skater, married to Anni
- Jan Postma (1895–1944), Dutch politician
- Laura Postma (born 1993), German politician
- Lidia Postma (born 1952), Dutch writer, artist and illustrator
- Loek Postma (born 2003), Dutch footballer
- Marco Postma (born 1983), Dutch ice hockey player
- Martine Postma (born 1970), Dutch founder of Repair Café
- Obe Postma (1868–1963), Dutch West-Frisian poet
- Paul Postma (born 1989), Canadian ice hockey player
- Pieter-Jan Postma (born 1982), Dutch sailor
- Stefan Postma (born 1976), Dutch footballer
- Tineke Postma (born 1978), Dutch saxophonist
- Willy Postma (born 1932), Dutch athlete
- Wytske Postma (born 1977), Dutch politician
