= Betje =

Betje is a Dutch feminine given name. It is a diminutive of Elisabeth. Notable people with the name include:

- Betje Koeten-Ooms (1888–1968), Dutch politician
- Betje Koolhaas (born 1972), Dutch actress
- Betje Wery (1920–2006), Dutch Nazi collaborator
- Betje Wolff (1738–1804), Dutch novelist
  - Museum Betje Wolff, Beemster, the Netherlands

Fictional characters

- Betje, a character in the 1918 novel Student Hidjo
- Betje, a character in the 1942 novel Ciske de Rat
- Betje, a character in the 2023 miniseries A Small Light
- Betje Ackerboom, a character in the 1961 film Three Men in a Boat
- Betje Boerhave, grocer's wife who ostensibly kept a diary, and the namesake of the Betje Boerhavemuseum in Utrecht, the Netherlands

== See also ==
- Aunt Betje (tante Betje), a term attributed to Gerard Nolst Trenité (Charivarius)
