= Marjan Minnesma =

Dutch activist (1966–2026)

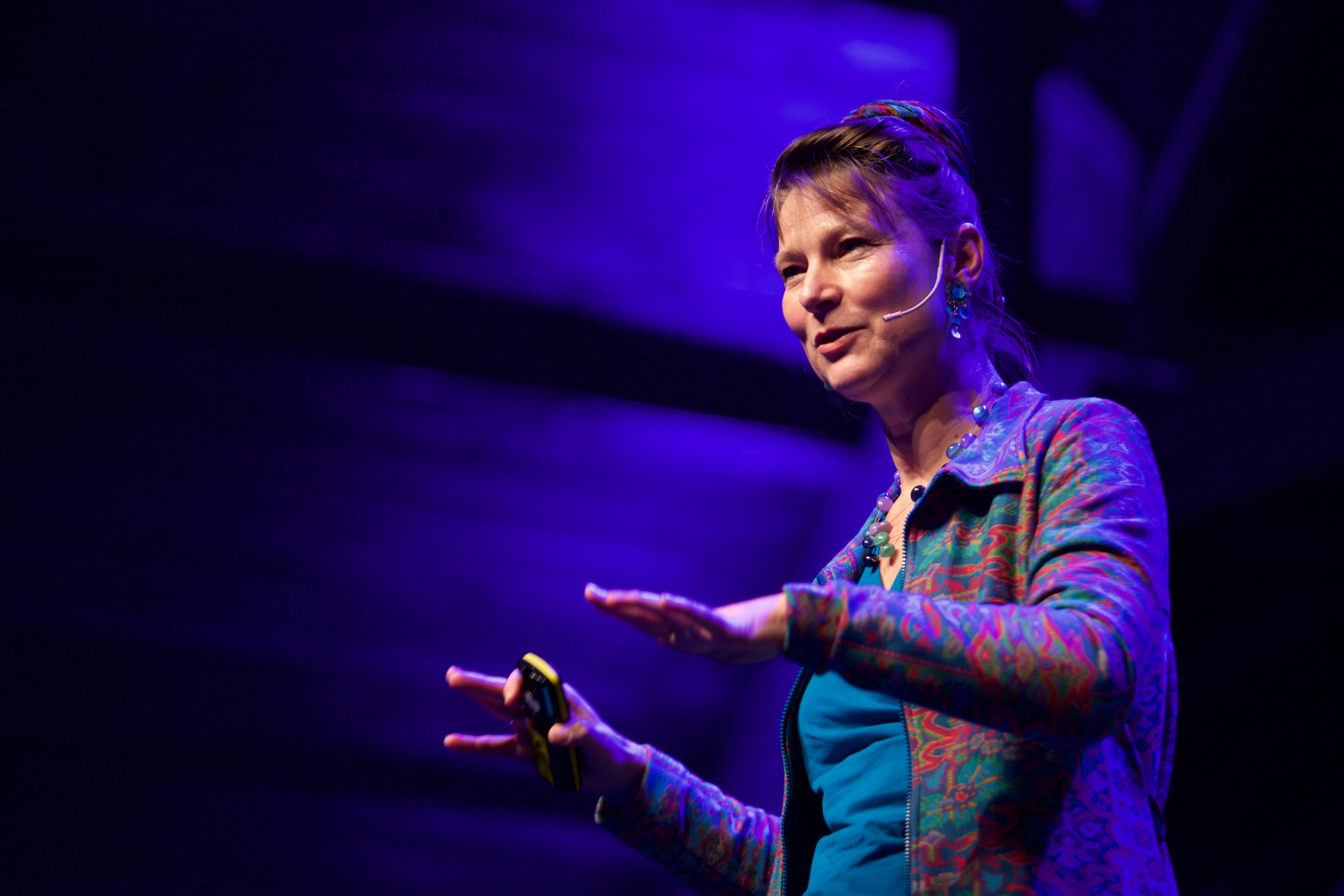
- Minnesma (2015)
- Born: Marjan Minnesma; 28 October 1966; Wormerveer, Netherlands
- Died: 22 May 2026 (aged 59); Noordbeemster, Netherlands
- Occupation: Activist
- Known for: Co-founding Urgenda Foundation

Marjan Minnesma (28 October 1966 – 22 May 2026) was a Dutch activist.

== Biography ==
Marjan Minnesma was born and raised in North-Holland. She held a degree in international law on climate change.

In 2022, she received Goldman Environmental Prize for suing the Dutch government over its carbon emissions plans. She won this lawsuit, becoming first woman to successfully sue a government over carbon emissions.

She was the founder of Urgenda Foundation, which aims to help enforce national, European and international environment treaties.

Minnesma died of breast cancer in her hometown of Noordbeemster, on 22 May 2026, at the age of 59.

== Recognition ==
- 2022: Goldman Environmental Prize
