= Aagje =

Dutch feminine given name

- Gender: female
- Language: Dutch

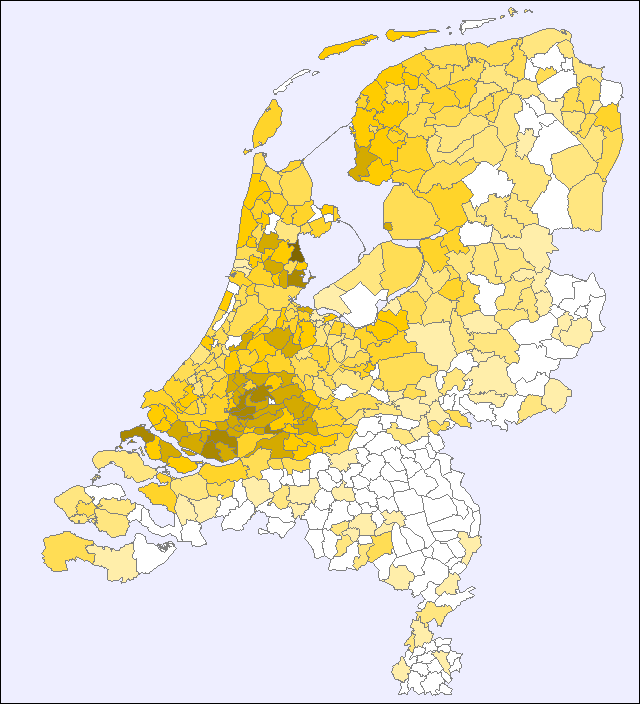
Name distribution map for Aagje in the Netherlands before 2018; areas with a darker shade had a higher percentage of babies registered with the name.

Aagje is a feminine Dutch given name. Notable people with this name include:

- Aagje Vanwalleghem (born 1987), Belgian gymnast.
- Aagje Deken (1741–1804), Dutch writer.
- Ada Kok (born 1947), Dutch former swimmer.
