= Beemster =

- Former municipality
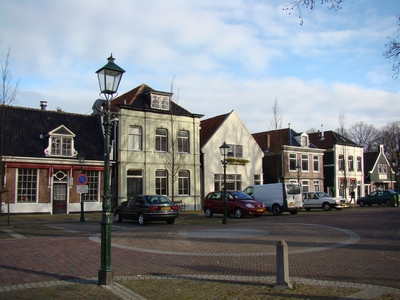
- Middenbeemster town centre

- Flag Coat of arms

- Location of the former municipality of Beemster in North Holland
- Coordinates: 52°33′N 4°55′E
- Country: Netherlands
- Province: North Holland
- Municipality: Purmerend

Area
  - Total: 72.07 km^{2} (27.83 sq mi)
  - Land: 70.58 km^{2} (27.25 sq mi)
  - Water: 1.49 km^{2} (0.58 sq mi)
- Elevation: −4 m (−13 ft)

Population (January 2021)
  - Total: 10,110
  - Density: 143/km^{2} (370/sq mi)
- Time zone: UTC+1 (CET)
  - Summer (DST): UTC+2 (CEST)
- Postcode: 1460–1464
- Area code: 0299
- Website: www.beemster.net

UNESCO World Heritage Site
- Official name: Droogmakerij de Beemster (Beemster Polder)
- Criteria: Cultural: i, ii, iv
- Reference: 899
- Inscription: 1999 (23rd Session)

Beemster (Dutch pronunciation: [ˈbeːmstər]) is a former municipality in the Netherlands, in the province of North Holland. The Beemster is the first polder in the Netherlands reclaimed from a lake, the water extracted by windmills between 1609 and 1612. The original well-ordered landscape of fields, roads, canals, and dykes has been preserved intact. A grid of canals parallels the grid of roads in the Beemster. The larger feeder canals are offset by approximately one kilometer from the larger roads.

Beemster merged into the existing municipality of Purmerend on 1 January 2022.

== Population centres ==
The former municipality of Beemster contained the following small towns and villages:

- Middenbeemster
- Noordbeemster
- Westbeemster
- Zuidoostbeemster.

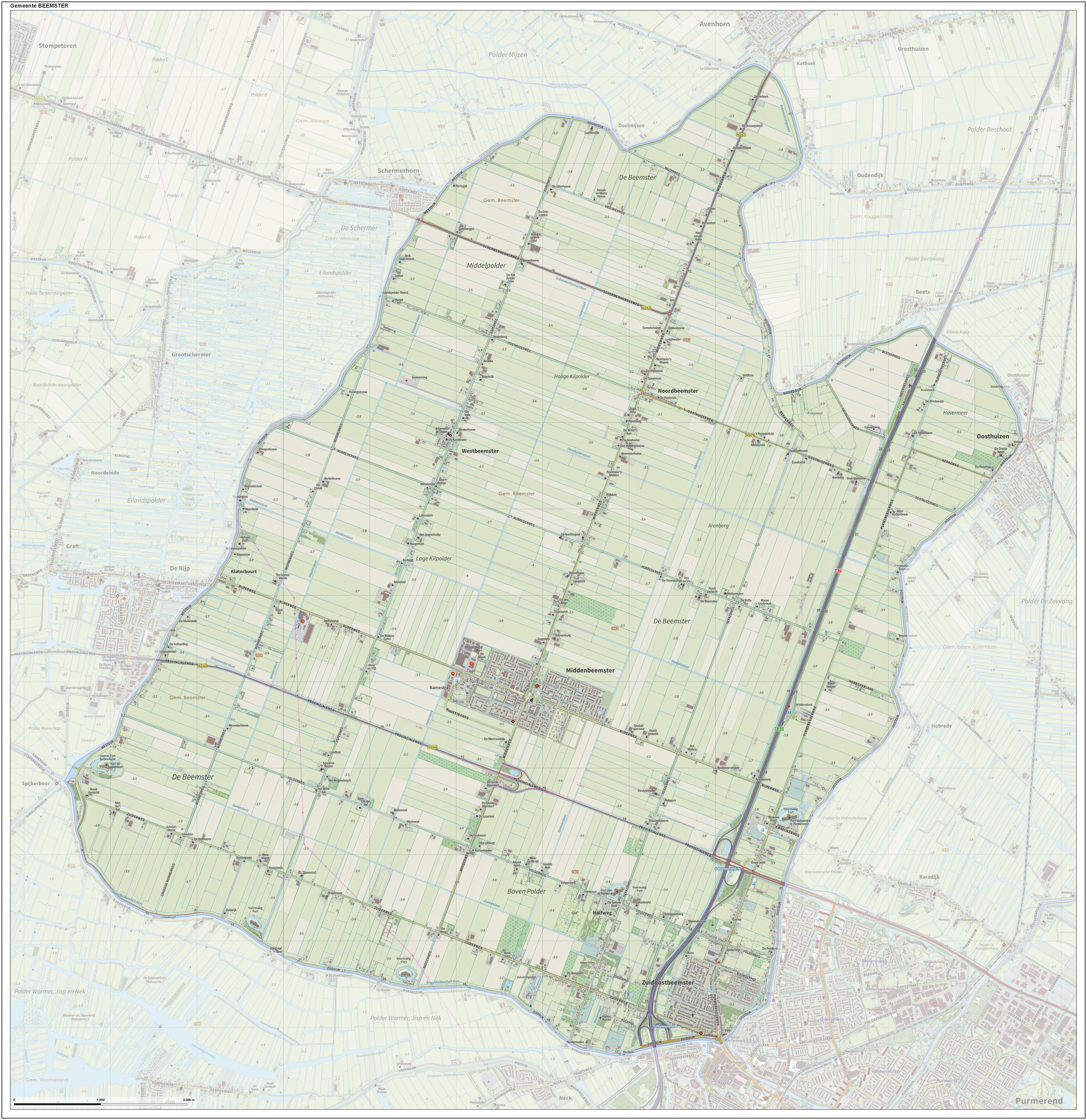
Map of the former municipality of Beemster, 2015.

== History ==
Around 800 AD the area of the modern municipality of Beemster was covered in peat. The name "Beemster" was derived from "Bamestra", the name of a small river in the area. In the period 1150–1250 peat-digging and storm floods enlarged that small river into an inland sea, a lake connected with the Zuiderzee. Around 1605 private investors started to drain the Beemster lake. In 1610, this was almost complete, but the lake re-filled because of a breach in the Zuiderzee dikes. It was decided to make the ring-dike a meter high above the surrounding country. In 1612 the polder was dry and the land was divided among the investors. In the earlier days of the polder, farmers occupied its lands for growing the crops necessary for long sea journeys by the VOC to the East Indies. The farmland was so good that the project was considered an economic success, in contrast to, e.g., the Heerhugowaard. Since 1999 the entire Beemster polder has been on the UNESCO world heritage list.

The Beemster polder is home to CONO Kaasmakers, maker of the Beemster brand of cheeses. This co-op was formed in 1901 to create cheese made from milk that comes from the Beemster polder. Today Beemster Cheese is sold in Europe, the U.S., Canada, Japan, and China.

== World Heritage Site ==
Because of its historical relevance, and as the original structure of the area is still largely intact, the Beemster was added to the UNESCO World Heritage Site list in 1999. Justification for inclusion is as follows:

- (i): The Beemster Polder is a masterpiece of creative planning, in which the ideals of antiquity and the Renaissance were applied to the design of a reclaimed landscape.
- (ii): The innovative and intellectually imaginative landscape of the Beemster Polder had a profound and lasting impact on reclamation projects in Europe and beyond.
- (iv): The creation of the Beemster Polder marks a major step forward in the interrelationship between humankind and water at a crucial period of social and economic expansion.

In addition, in the Beemster Polder, there are five fortresses as part of the Stelling van Amsterdam, another UNESCO World Heritage Site. The Beemster Polder combines two UNESCO World Heritage Sites.

== Local government ==
The municipal council of Beemster consisted of 13 seats which at the last elections in 2018 divided as follows:

- Beemster Polder Partij - 6 seats
- VVD - 3 seats
- PvdA - 2 seats
- D66 - 1 seat
- CDA - 1 seat

The last mayor was Joyce van Beek (CDA).

Elections were held in November 2021 for a council for the new merged municipality of Purmerend, that included Beemster, which commenced work in January 2022.

== Notable people ==
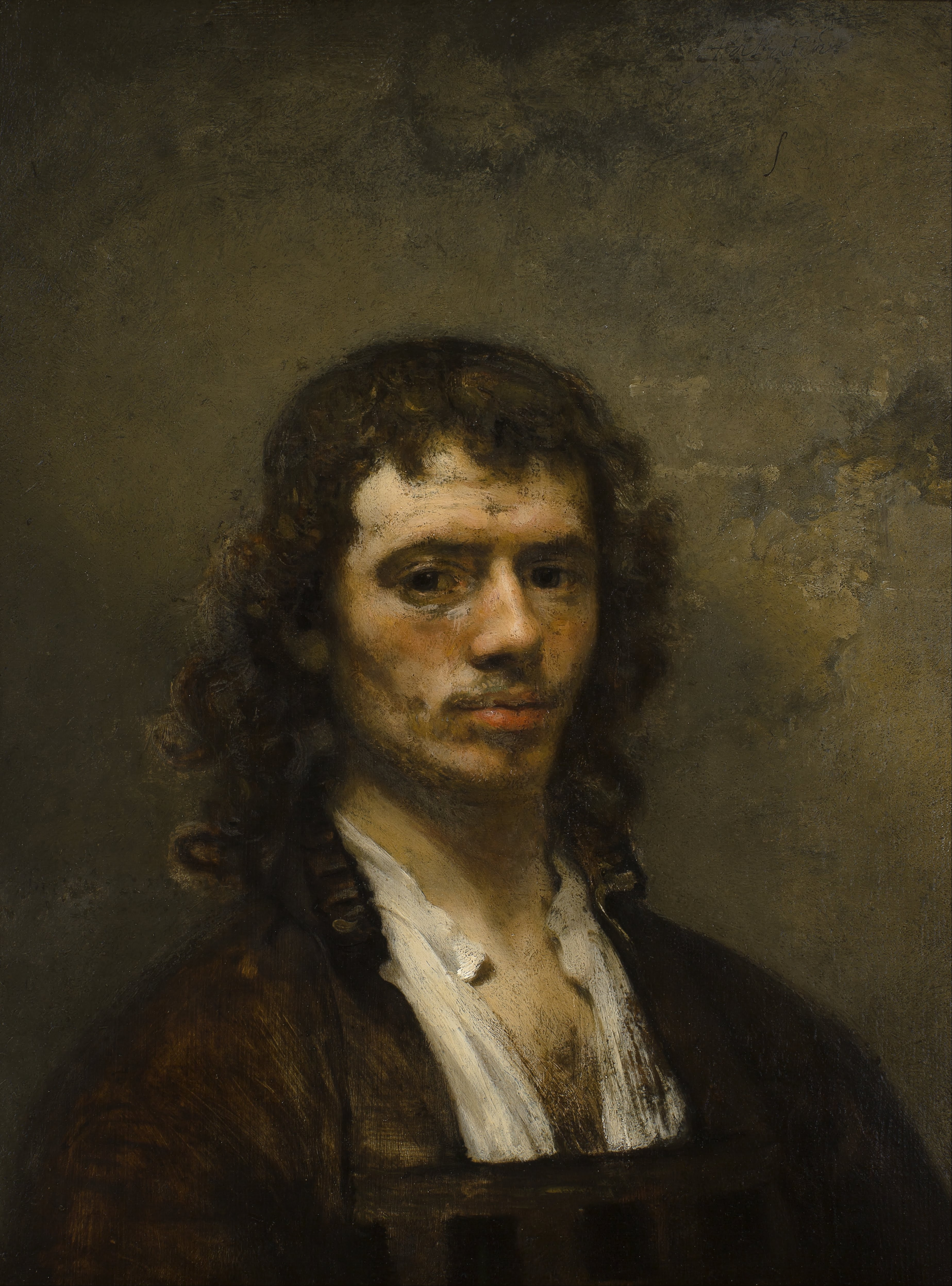
Carel Fabritius, ca.1645

- Carel Fabritius (1622 in Middenbeemster – 1654) a Dutch painter
- Barent Fabritius (1624 in Middenbeemster - 1673) a Dutch painter
- Johannes Fabritius (1636 – ca.1693) a Dutch Golden Age painter
- The Reverend Nanne Zwiep (1894 in Beemster – 1942 in Dachau) a pastor of the Dutch Reformed Church
- Harry Droog (born 1944) a retired Dutch rower, competed at the 1968 Summer Olympics
- Erik Postma (1953 – 2002 in Middenbeemster) a Dutch politician, Mayor of Beemster from 1998

== See also ==
- Museum Betje Wolff

== Gallery ==
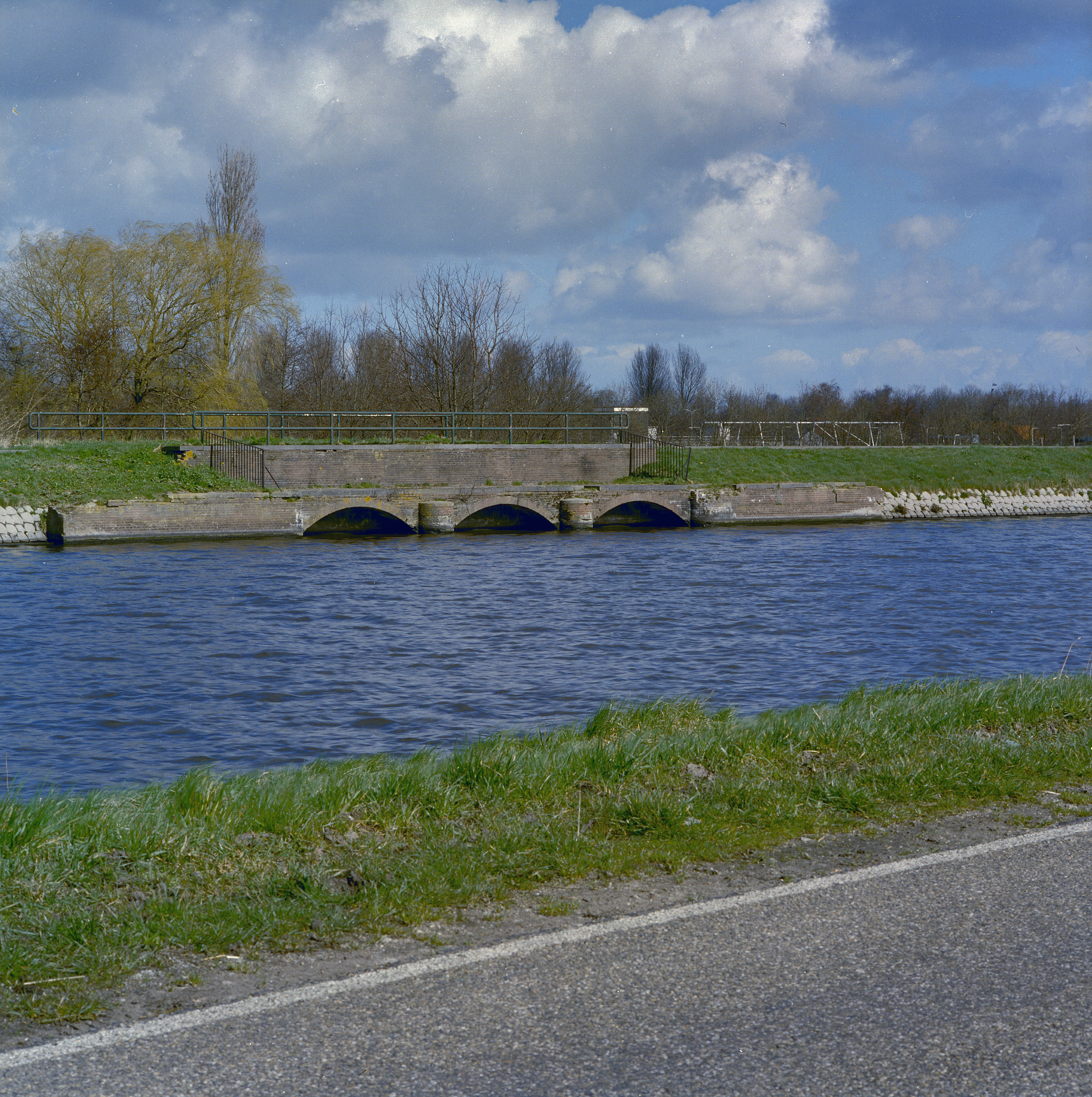
Inlet sluice near Zuiddijk 14 - Beemster

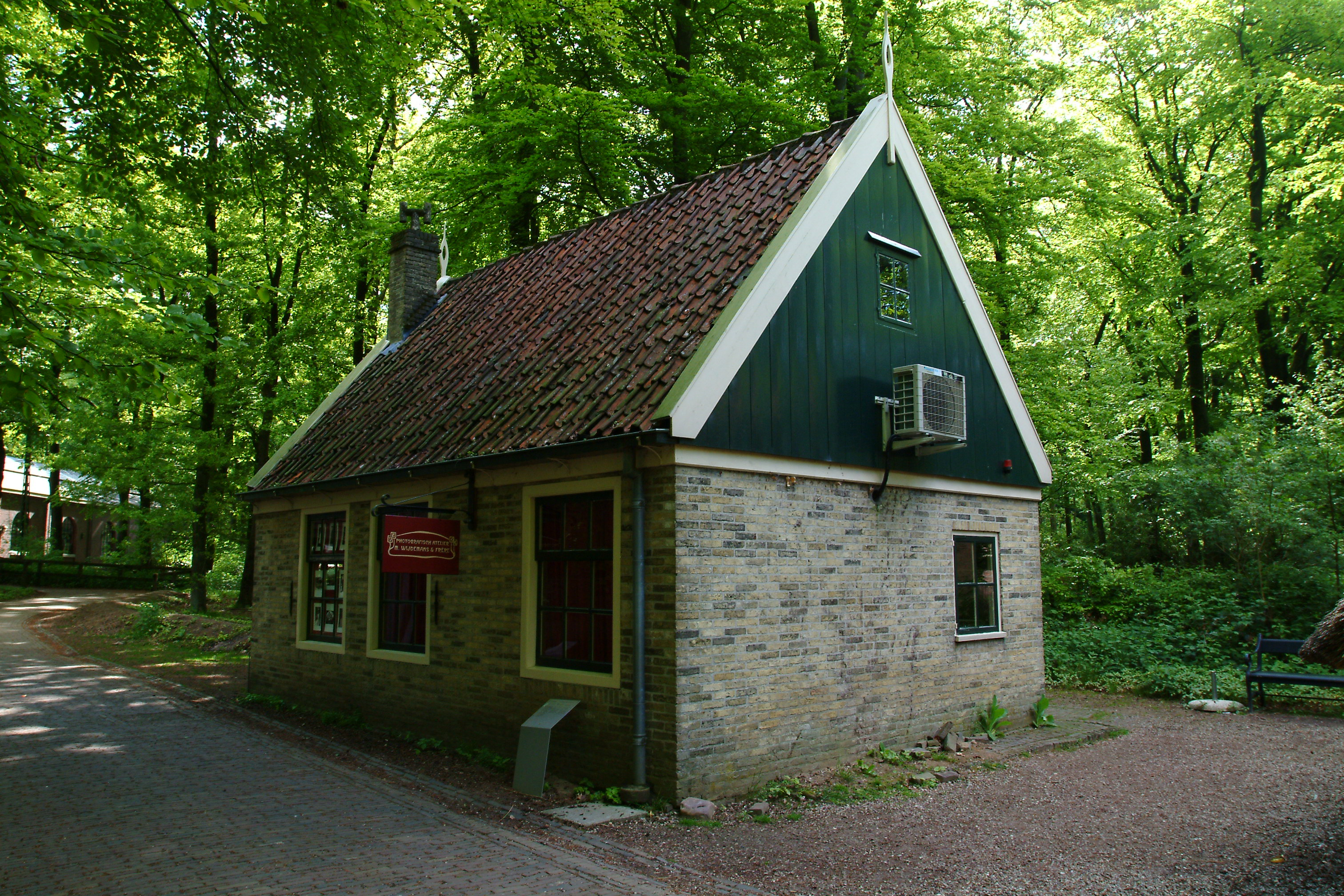
Beemster gardener's house, now in the Dutch Open Air Museum

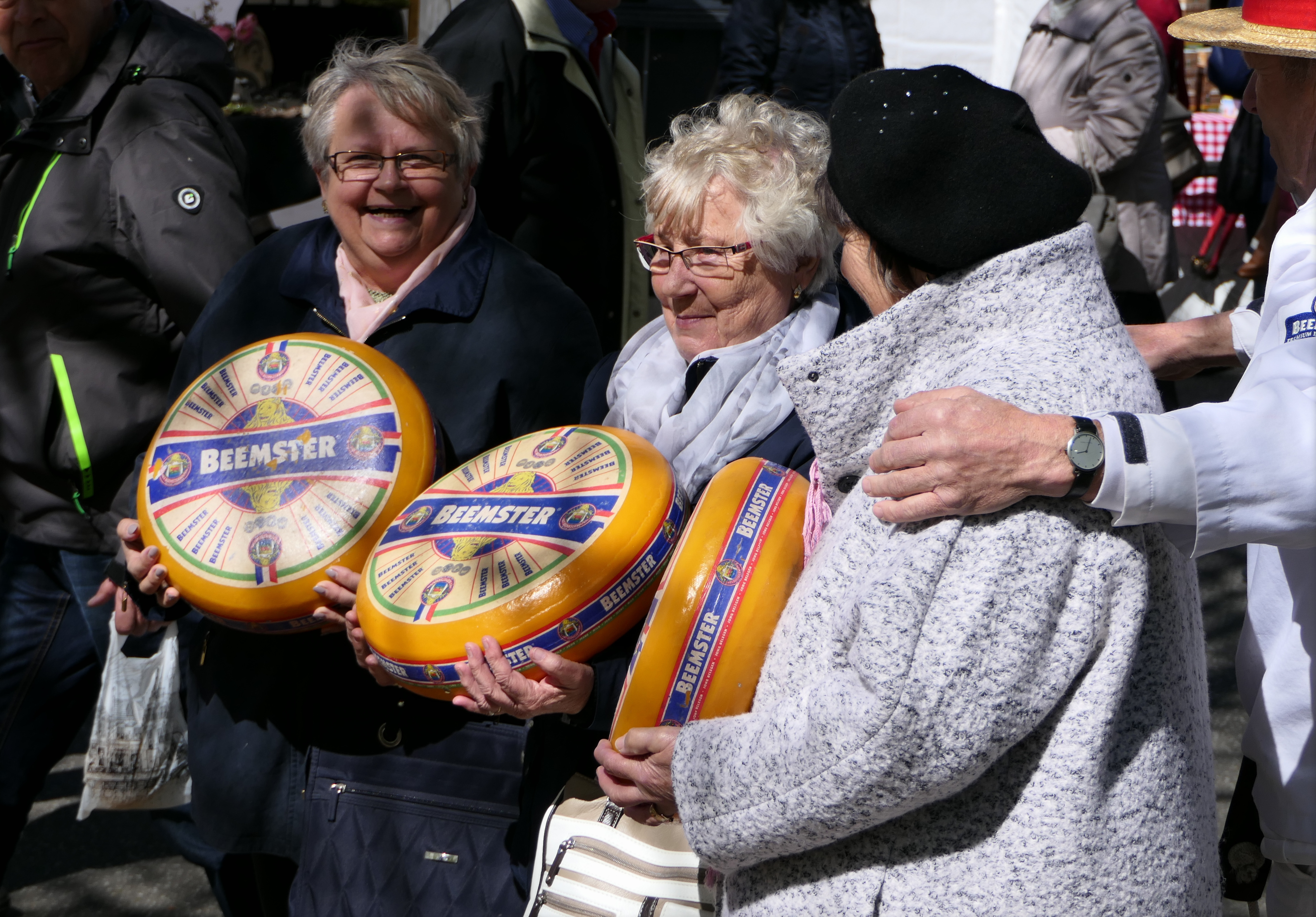
Beemster cheese

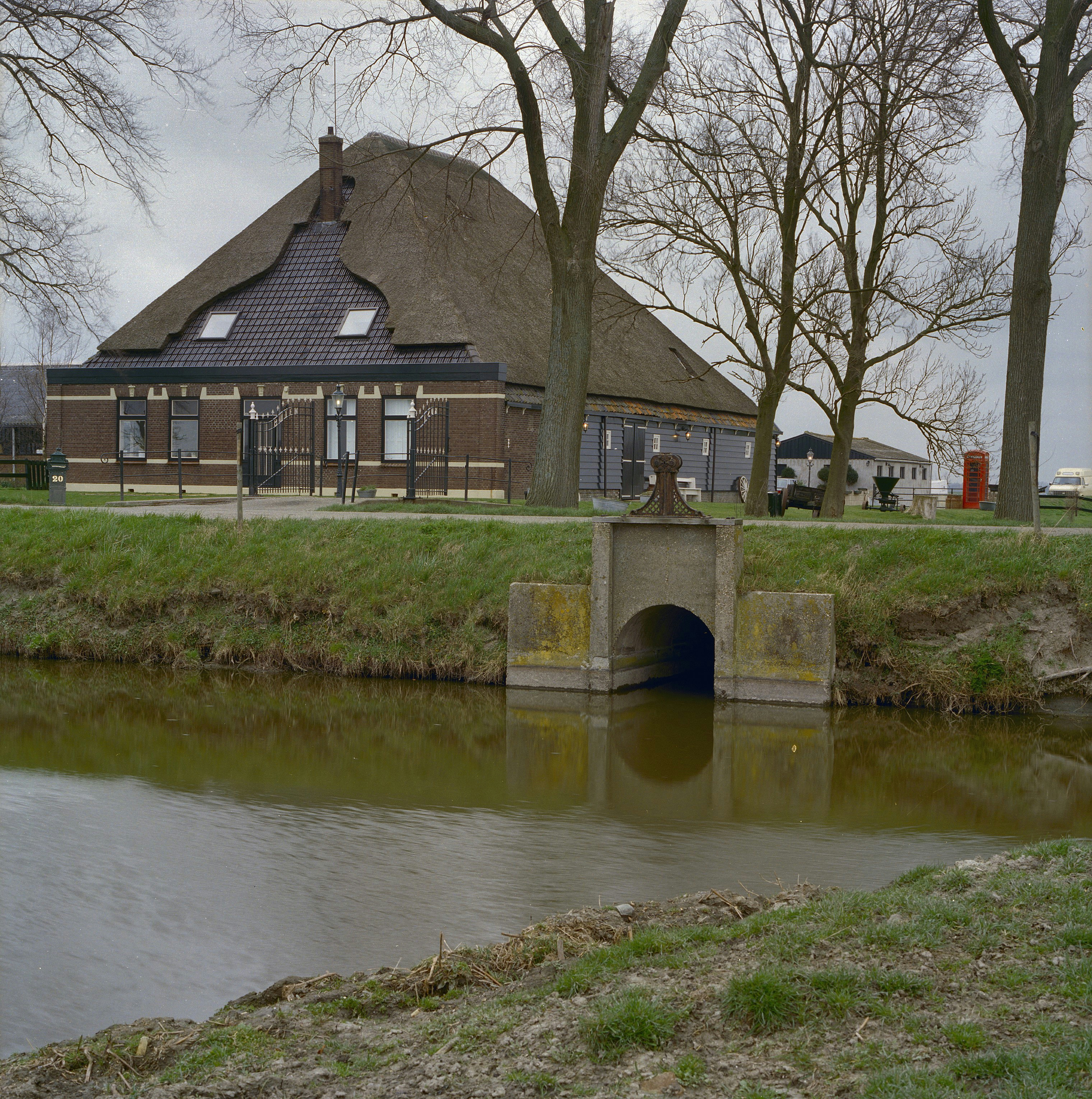
Inlet sluice near Volgerweg 20 - Beemster
