= Nanne Zwiep =

Dutch pastor

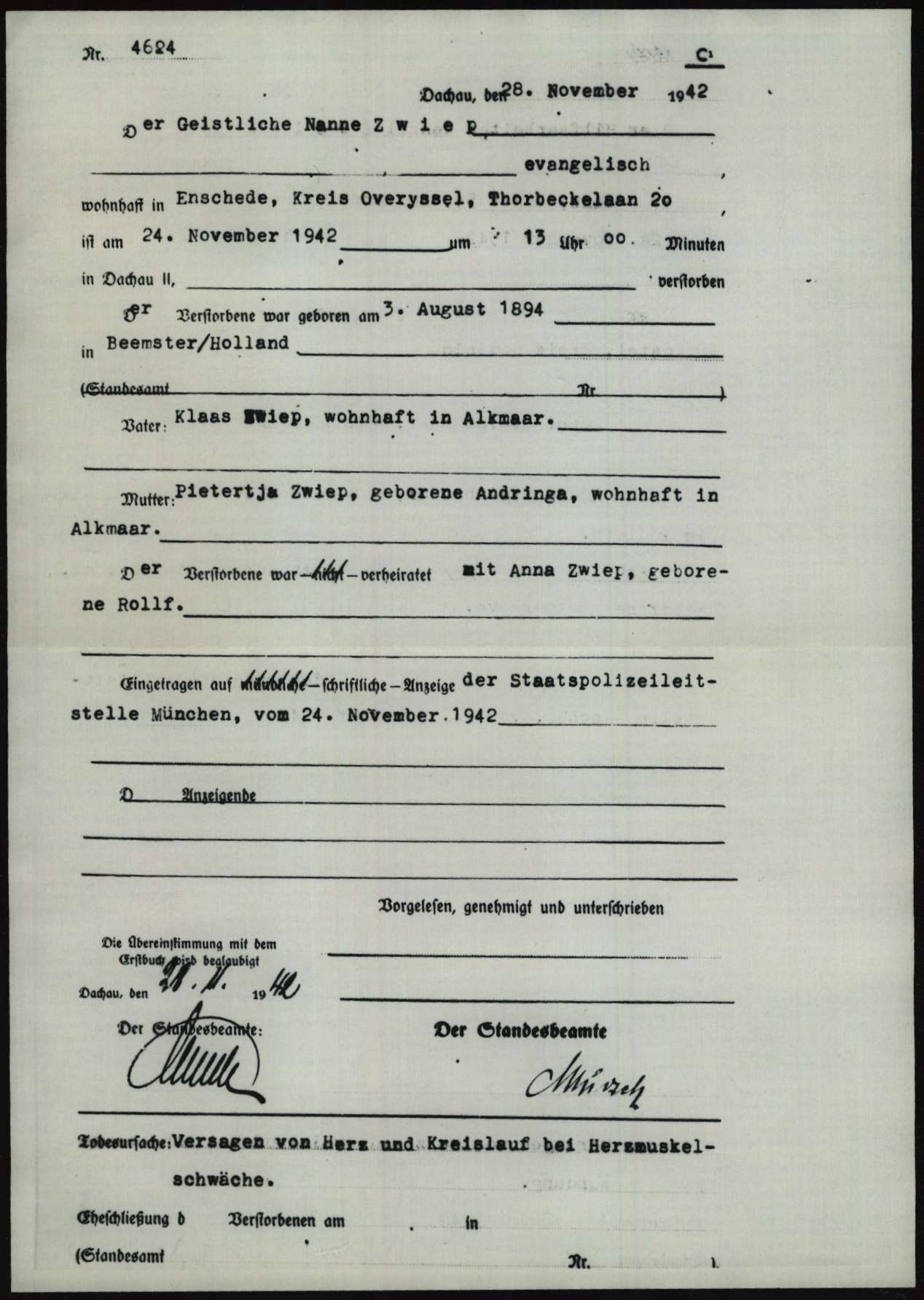
Death certificate of Zwiep, prisoner in Dachau Nazi Concentration Camp. Reported cause of death: "Heart and circulation failure caused by cardiac insufficiency."

The Reverend Nanne Zwiep (3 August 1894 in Beemster, North Holland – 24 November 1942 in Dachau) was a pastor of the Dutch Reformed Church in the town of Enschede. He was arrested by the Nazis during the German occupation of the Netherlands and murdered in the concentration camp at Dachau near Munich.

Zwiep became a pastor in Enschede in 1929 and was a well-known figure in the town. On Sunday 19 April 1942, he spoke out in a sermon against National Socialism and the persecution of the Jews. The following day he was arrested by the Germans and after five months of interrogation in prison in Arnhem and Amersfoort he was transported to Dachau. On 24 November 1942, two months after his arrival at the camp, he died of exhaustion and malnutrition.

The biggest Scout group in Enschede is named in Zwiep's memory.

A street in Oostzaan, North Holland, a town where Zwiep worked as pastor from 1924 to 1927, bears his name - the "Dominee Nanne Zwiepsingel". On 4 May 1978, Oostzaan erected a monument dedicated to the reverend, consisting of a bronze statue of a chair with a chained bird.
