= Zuidoostbeemster =

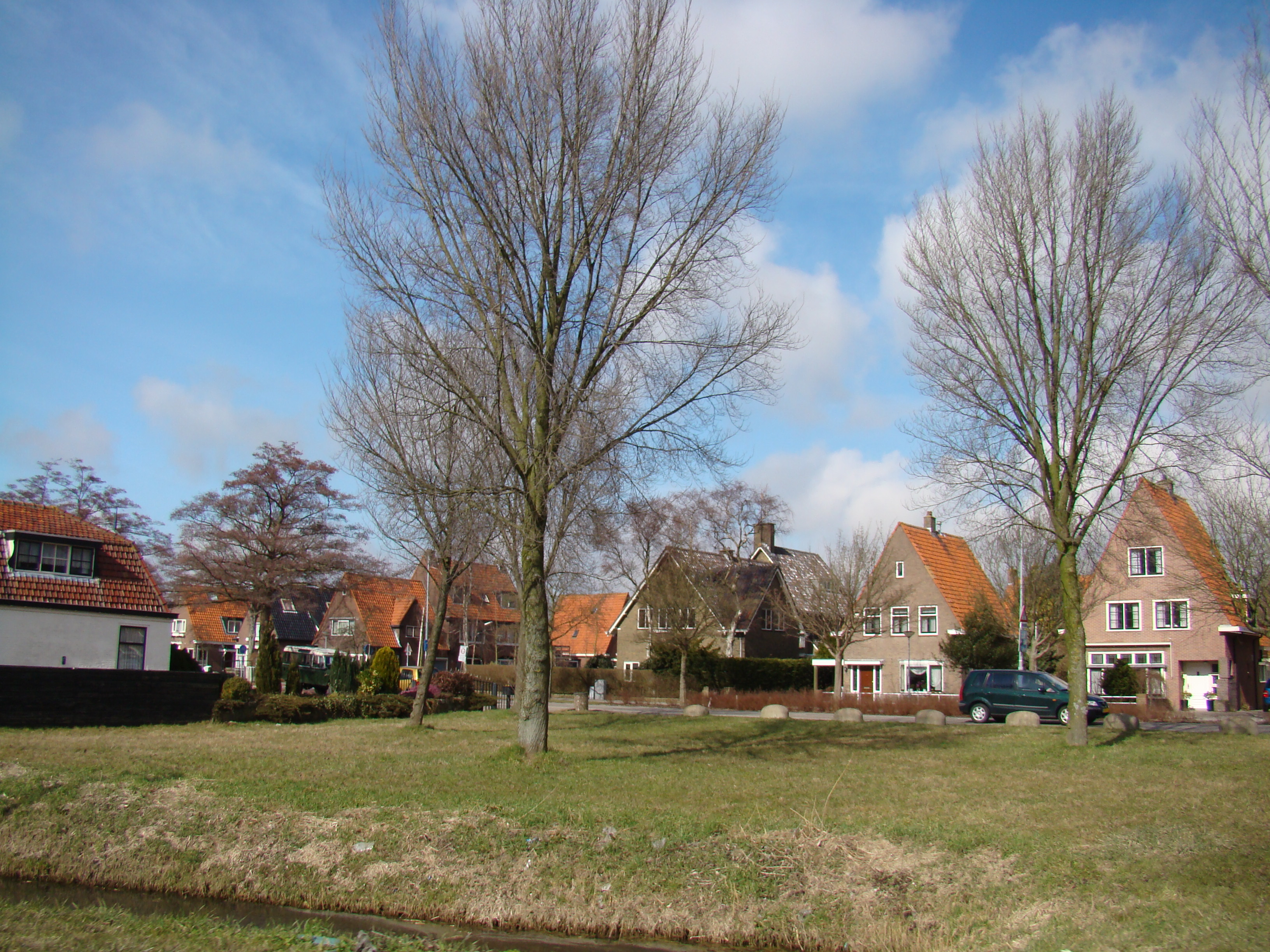

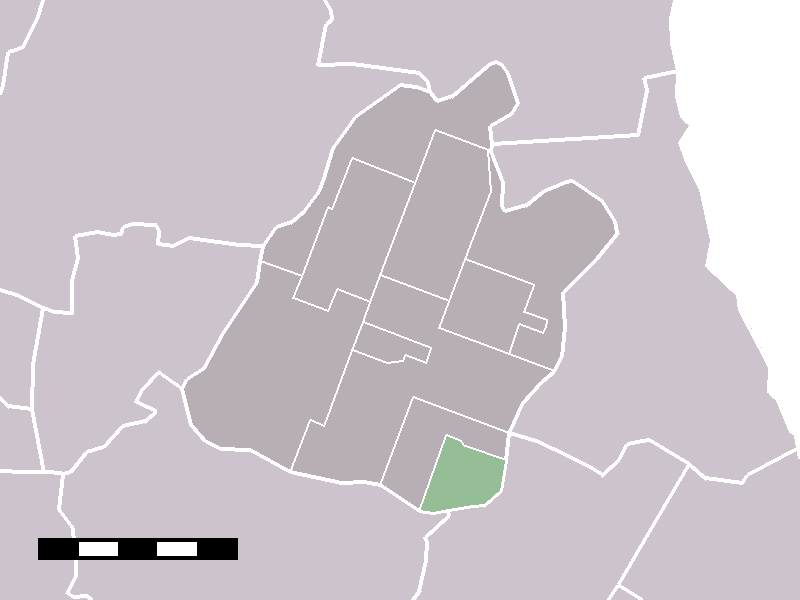
- The statistical district of Zuidoostbeemster in the former municipality of Beemster.

- Location in the Netherlands
- Coordinates: 52°31′N 4°57′E
- Country: Netherlands
- Province: North Holland
- Municipality: Purmerend

Population (3 October 2025)
  - Total: 4,540

Zuidoostbeemster is a town in the west of the Netherlands in the former municipality of Beemster, North Holland. It is located about 1 km northwest of Purmerend. Since 2022 it has been part of the municipality of Purmerend.

In 2025, the statistical district "Zuidoostbeemster", covering the village and surrounding countryside, had a population of around 4,540.
