= Johannes Fabritius =

Dutch painter

- Born: 30 November 1636; Beemster, Dutch Republic
- Died: After 1693; Hoorn, Dutch Republic
- Occupation: Painter
- Known for: Still lifes
- Parent: Pieter Carelsz. Fabritius
- Relatives: Carel Fabritius (1622–1654); Barent Fabritius (1624–1673)

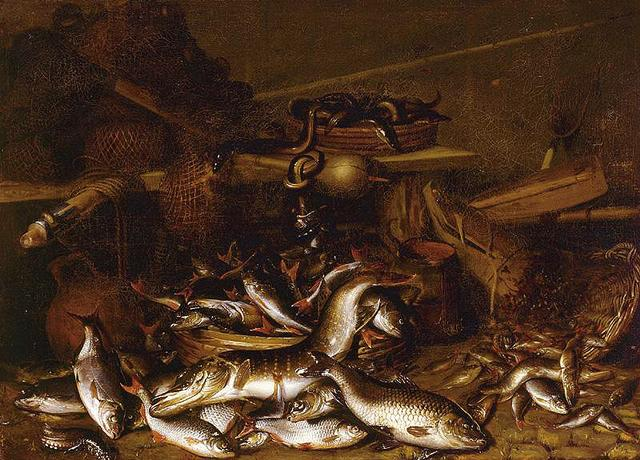
Still life of fish, eels, and fishing nets

Johannes Fabritius (30 November 1636 – after 1693) was a Dutch Golden Age painter.

Fabritius was born in Beemster as the son of Pieter Carelsz Fabritius. He was the brother of Barent and Carel Fabritius. Carel died in the Delft explosion of 1654.

Fabritius is known for still life paintings and probably died in Hoorn where he went to live in 1676.
