= Urgenda =

Dutch nonprofit environmental foundation

urgenda
- Stichting Urgenda
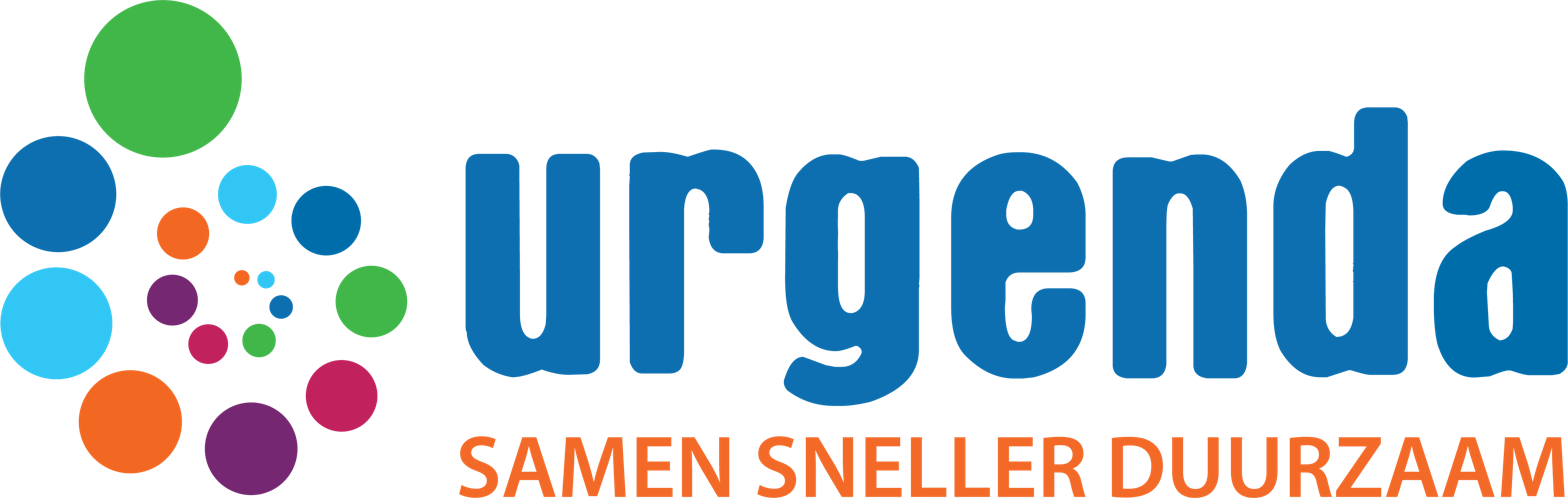
- Formation: 2007
- Founder: Jan Rotmans, Marjan Minnesma
- Founded at: Amsterdam, Netherlands
- Type: Stichting (Foundation under netherlands law)
- Purpose: Climate change mitigation, environmental protection, sustainability
- Website: urgenda.nl

Urgenda is a nonprofit foundation (stichting) in the Netherlands which aims to help enforce national, European and international environment treaties. In 2013, Urgenda filed a lawsuit against the state of the Netherlands – respectively also against the government – at the court of The Hague, to force them to make more effective policies that reduce the amount of emissions, with the aim to protect the people of the Netherlands against the effects of climate change and pollution.

== History ==
The name Urgenda is a portmanteau of the words urgente (urgent) and agenda. It was founded in 2007 by Jan Rotmans (professor at the Erasmus University (Rotterdam) and Marjan Minnesma (lawyer, economic scientist and philosopher).

== Success in court case against the government ==
Urgenda Foundation v State of the Netherlands (2019) (in Dutch: Klimaatzaak Urgenda) is climate change litigation heard by the Supreme Court of the Netherlands related to government efforts to curtail carbon dioxide emissions. The case was brought against the Dutch government in 2013, arguing the government, by not meeting a minimum carbon dioxide emission-reduction goal established by scientists to avert harmful climate change, was endangering the human rights of Dutch citizens as set by national and European Union laws.

The initial ruling in 2015, requiring the government to meet an emissions goal of 25% reduction from 1990 levels by 2020, was upheld through the Supreme Court on appeals, affirming that reduction in emissions was necessary for the Dutch government to protect human rights. It is the first such tort case taken against a government challenging climate change aspects based on a human rights foundation, and the first such successful climate justice case.

== Awards ==
- Doctor honoris causa of Saint-Louis University, Brussels, 2019
