= Erik Postma =

Dutch politician (1953–2002)

Erik Postma (15 December 1953, Rotterdam - 25 September 2002, Middenbeemster) was a Dutch politician of the Democrats 66 party.

In 1992, he was elected city manager (gemeentesecretaris) of Budel. After the municipal reorganization of North Brabant on 1 January 1997, Budel was incorporated along with the municipality Maarheeze in the new municipality Cranendonck, and Postma was made city manager.

In April 1998 Postma was appointed mayor of the northern Dutch municipality of Beemster. During his mayoral term, he died suddenly of cardiac arrest in September 2002. He was succeeded in his position by Harry Brinkman. In 2014, a street in Beemster was named after him.
