= Barent Fabritius =

Dutch painter

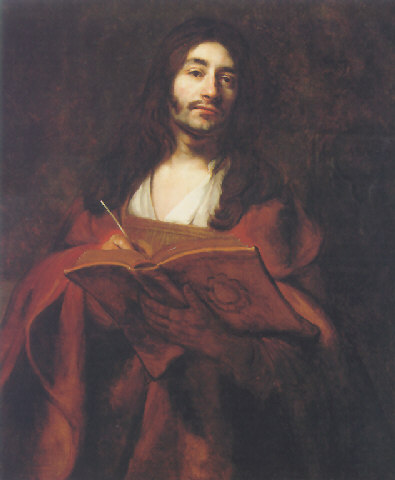
- Self-portrait as St. John the Evangelist
- Born: Barent Pietersz. Fabritius; Baptized on 16 November 1624; Middenbeemster, Dutch Republic
- Died: Buried on 20 October 1673 (aged 48); Amsterdam, Dutch Republic

Barent or Bernard Pietersz Fabritius (or Fabricius) (bapt. 16 November 1624 – bur. 20 October 1673), was a Dutch painter.

Fabritius was born at Middenbeemster, North Holland, the son of Pieter Carelsz. Fabritius. He studied with his brothers Johannes and Carel Fabritius, and probably with Rembrandt, as well. He was a painter of biblical subjects (The three angels before Abraham, The presentation in the temple), mythical and historical scenes, in addition to expressive portraits. He died in Amsterdam.

== Paintings ==
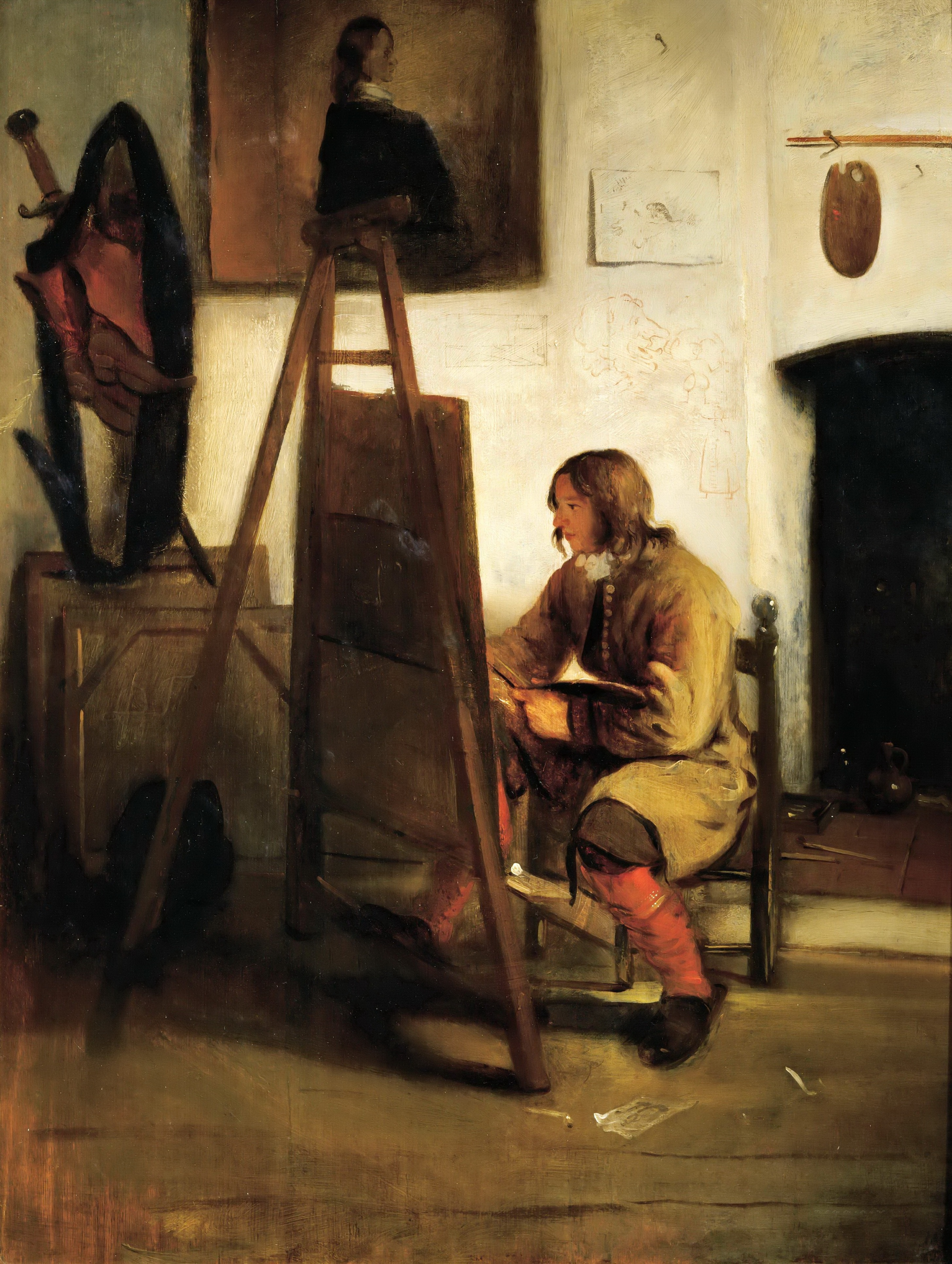
Young Painter in his Studio (c. 1655–1660)

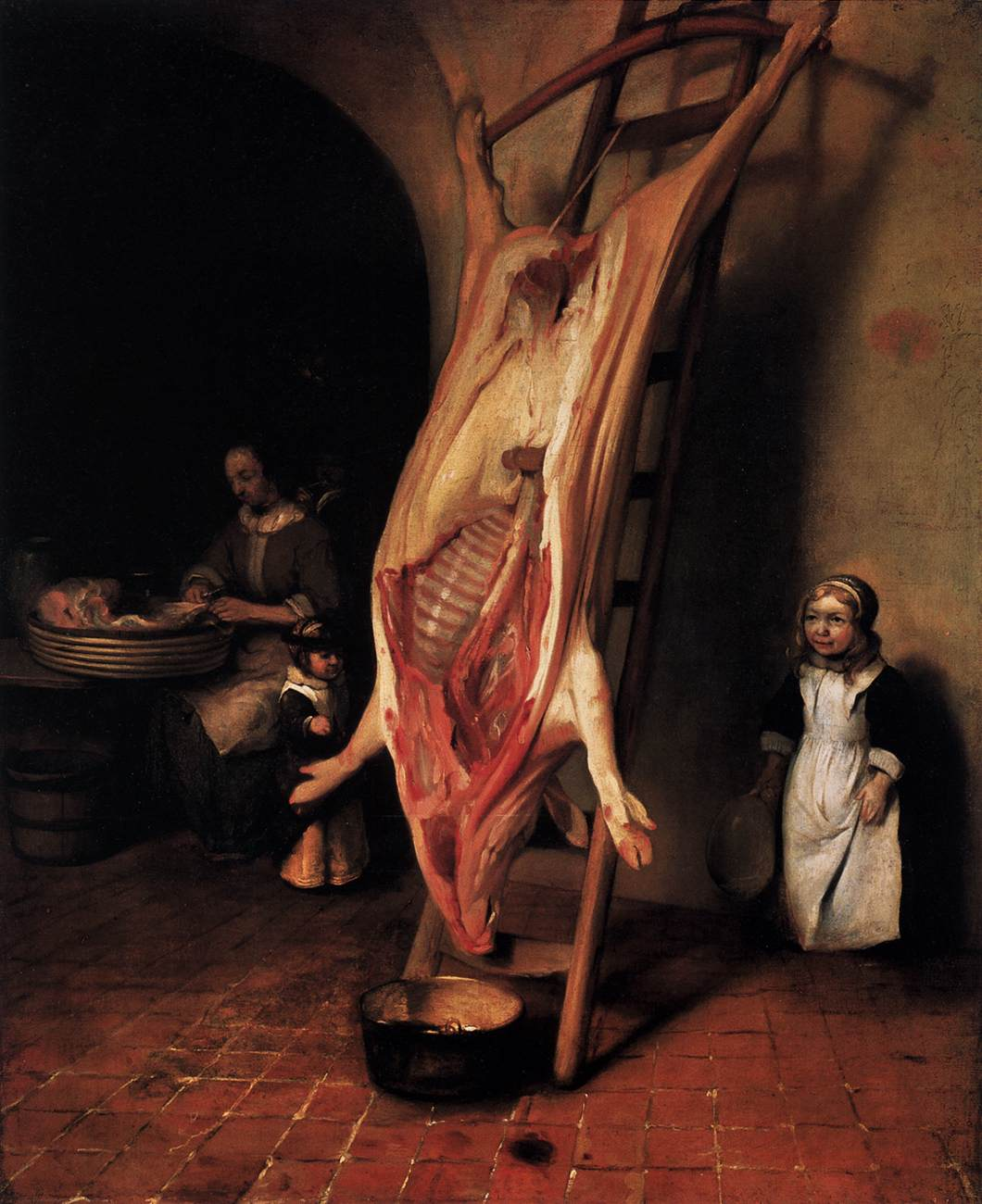
The Slaughtered Pig (1656)

Ruth and Boaz (1660)
