= Postema =

Postema is a Dutch surname. Notable people with the surname include:

- André Postema (born 1969), Dutch Labour politician
- Koos Postema (1932–2026), Dutch radio and television presenter
- Pam Postema (born 1954), American baseball umpire
- Romano Postema (born 2002), Dutch footballer

== See also ==
- Postma, a surname of Frisian origin
