= Francien de Zeeuw =

Dutch resistance fighter

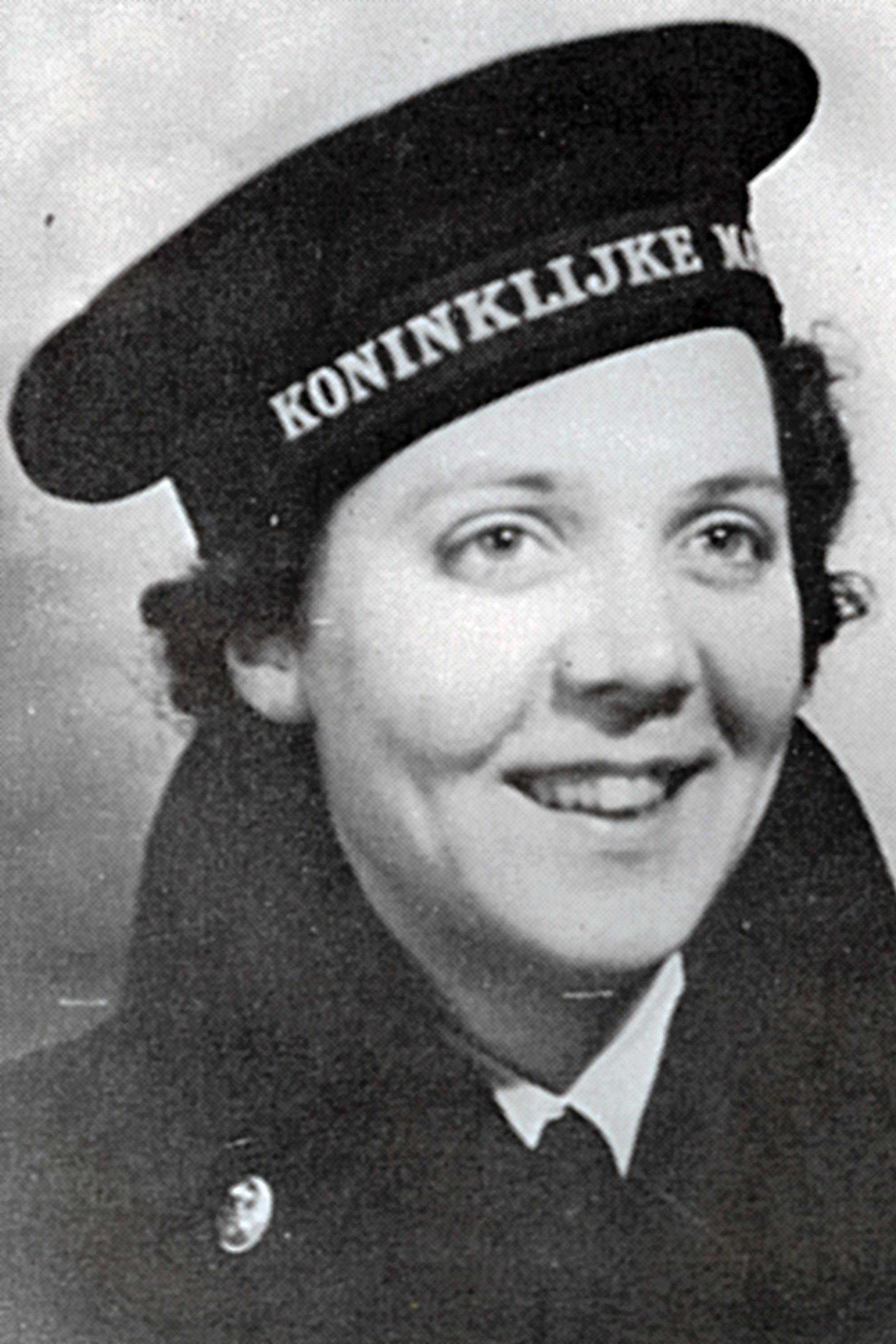
- Source: Dutch Institute for Military History
- Born: 19 May 1922 Terneuzen
- Died: 8 September 2015 (aged 93) Middenbeemster

Luitenant ter zee der 2de klasse Francien de Zeeuw (Terneuzen, 19 May 1922 – Middenbeemster, 8 September 2015) was a Dutch resistance fighter during the Second World War and the first female member of the Dutch armed forces.

== Life ==
De Zeeuw was the middle of three children born to a house painter from Terneuzen in the Netherlands. She gained employment as a telephone operator and, following the German invasion of the Netherlands, she was in a position to over-hear military telephone traffic. She provided information to the resistance network and also operated as a courier, carrying ration stamps and firearms. She was detained on several occasions and, in 1944, evaded capture by moving through the front lines to meet up with Canadian forces.

A woman's service of the Royal Dutch Navy, Marine Vrouwenafdeling (known as Marva) was established on 31 October 1944 and de Zeeuw is acknowledged as its first recruit. She served in the Far-East for three years – first at Colombo, arranging transport for the repatriation of Dutch servicemen, and then the Dutch East Indies working in a military post office. During this time, she fell in love with a soldier. As marriage to a lower rank was forbidden, she resigned from the service and returned to the Netherlands; however, her love died from yellow fever shortly after their return.

She continued in her earlier employment as a telephone operator. Some ten years later, she married Wim de Regt and had three children. At the time, it was not permitted for her to continue in employment.

De Zeeuw was decorated with the War Remembrance Cross, the Resistance Memorial Cross and the Medal for Peace and Order. She died in her hometown of Middenbeemster on 8 September 2015.
