= Betje Wolff =

Dutch novelist (1738-1804)

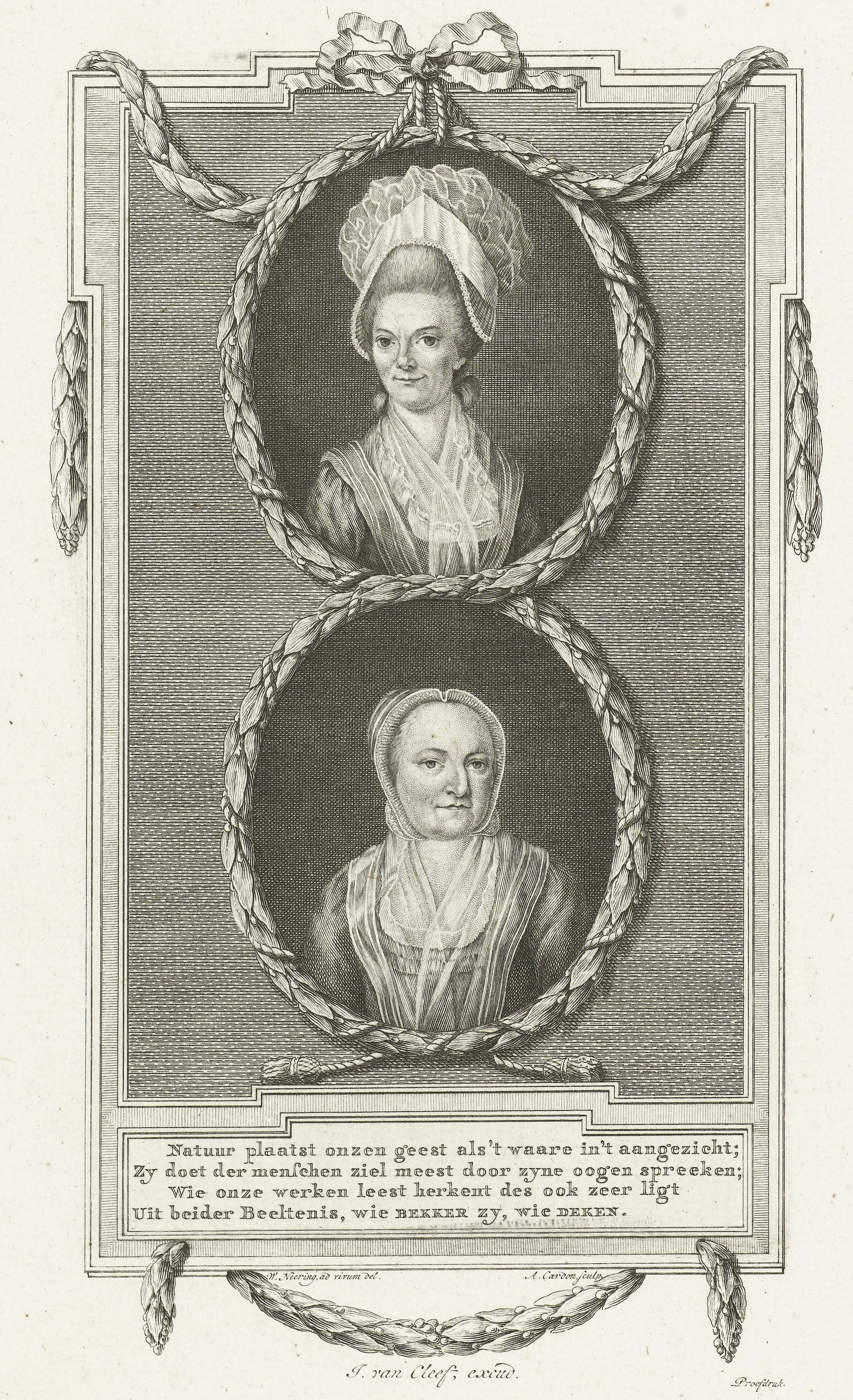
Betje Wolff (top) and Aagje Deken.

Elizabeth ("Betje") Wolff-Bekker (24 July 1738 – 5 November 1804) was a Dutch novelist who, with Agatha "Aagje" Deken, wrote several popular epistolary novels such as Sara Burgerhart (1782) and Willem Levend (1784).

== Biography ==
Bekker was born into a wealthy Calvinist family at Vlissingen. On 18 November 1759, at the age of 21, she married the 52-year-old clergyman Adriaan Wolff. In 1763, she published her first collection Bespiegelingen over het genoegen ('Reflections on Pleasure'). After her husband's death in 1777, she lived for a time with Aagje Deken in France. From then on the two women published their work together; it is somewhat difficult to determine the exact qualities contributed by each, though many believe that Wolff was the main author due to her wider acclaim before their pairing. They specialized in epistolary novels in the mold of Samuel Richardson.

Because of their Patriotic sympathies, they moved to Trévoux in Burgundy in 1788. In 1789, they published Wandelingen door Bourgogne. Wolff was exposed to some of the dangers of the French Revolution, and, it is said, escaped the guillotine only by her great presence of mind. More important though was her translation of the Swiss abolitionist Benjamin Sigismond Frossard in 1790. In 1795 she returned to the Netherlands and resided at the Hague till her death there at the age of 66.

== Works ==
- Historie van Mejuffrouw Sara Burgerhart (1782)
- Historie van den heer Willem Leevend (1784–1785)
- Abraham Blankaart (1787)
- Wandelingen door Bourgogne (1789)
- Cornelia Wildschut (1793–1796)

== See also ==
- Museum Betje Wolff
