= Noordbeemster =

- Town
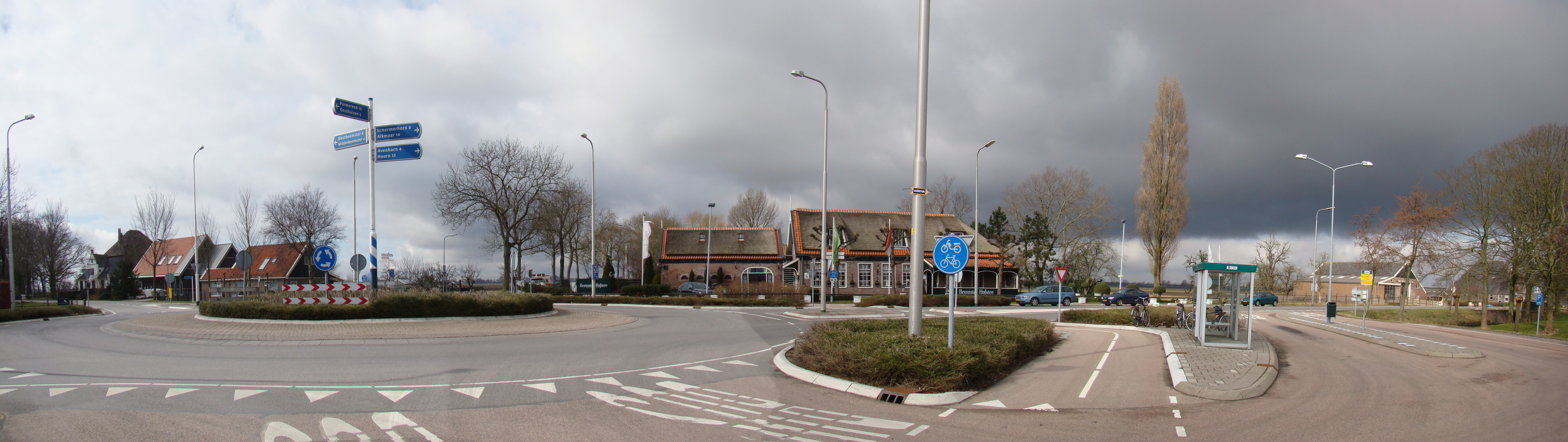
- Kruising Middenweg

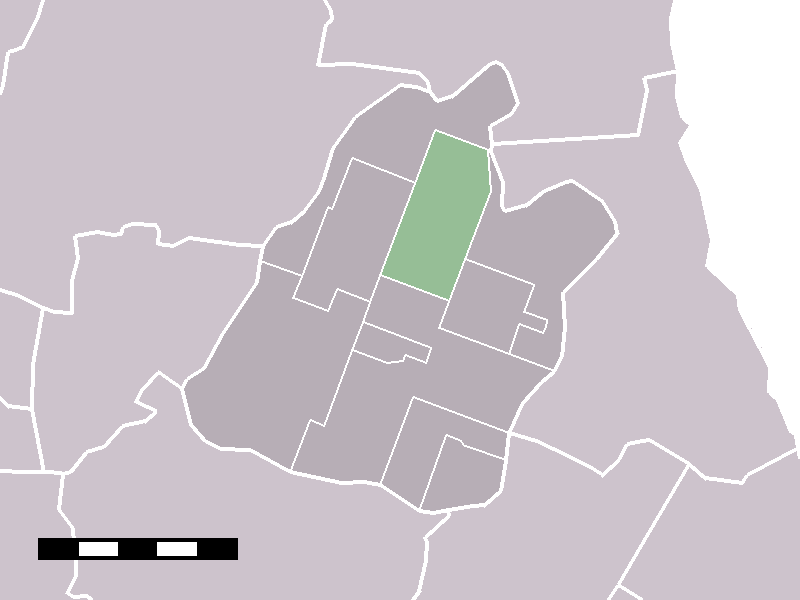
- The statistical district of Noordbeemster in the former municipality of Beemster.

- Location in the Netherlands
- Coordinates: 52°34′57″N 4°56′12″E
- Country: Netherlands
- Province: North Holland
- Municipality: Purmerend

Population (2025)
  - Total: 605
- Time zone: UTC+1 (CET)
  - Summer (DST): UTC+2 (CEST)

Noordbeemster is a town in the Dutch province of North Holland. It is a part of the former municipality of Beemster, and lies about 9 km north of Purmerend. Since 2022 it has been part of the municipality of Purmerend.

The statistical district "Noordbeemster", which covers the village and the surrounding countryside, has a population of around 605.
