= Museum Betje Wolff =

Museum in Beemster, the Netherlands

Coordinates: 52.5473°N 4.9125°E

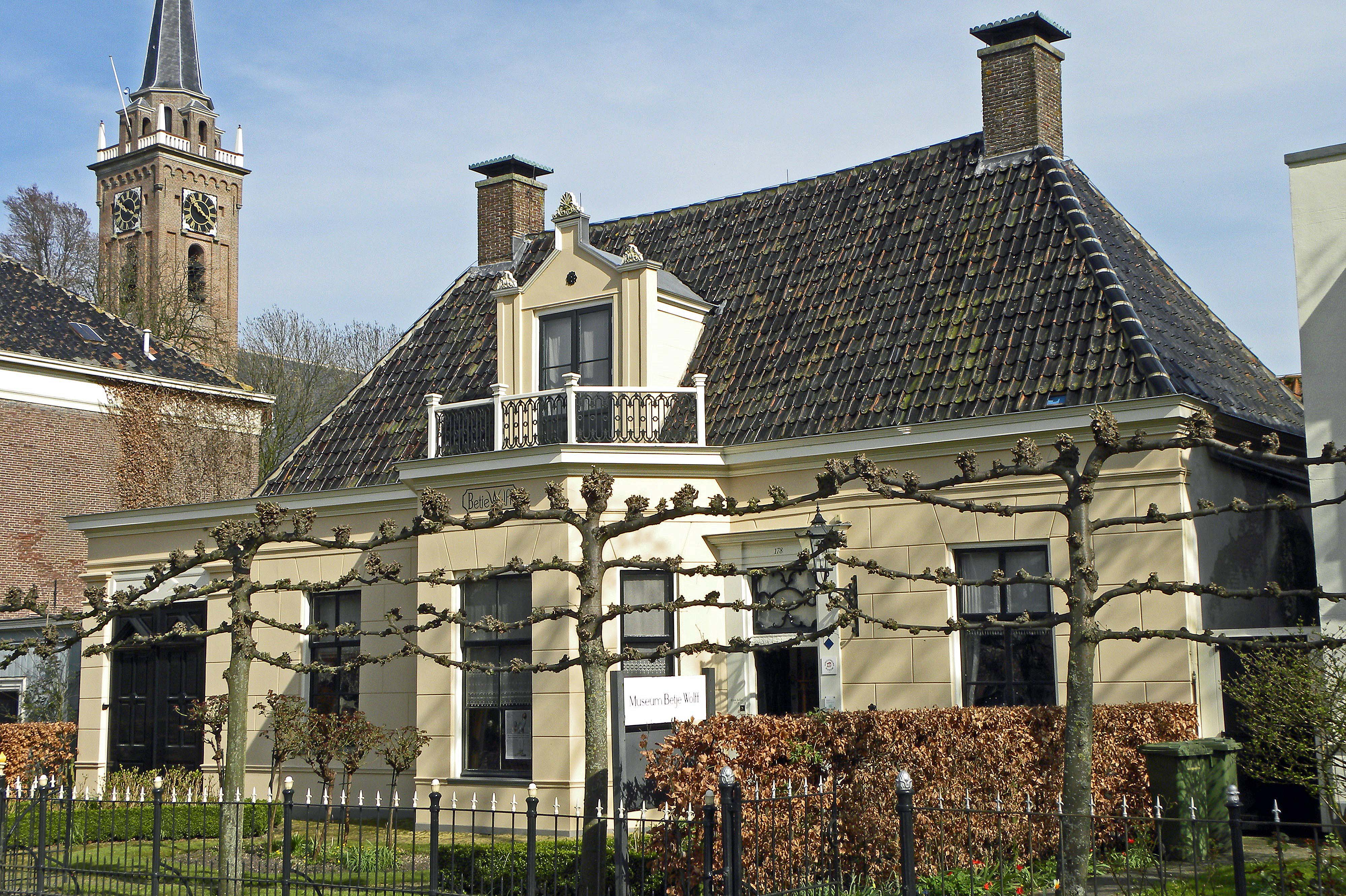
- Established: 1950
- Location: Middenweg 178, Beemster, North Holland, Netherlands
- Type: History

Museum Betje Wolff is a history and decorative arts museum in Beemster, North Holland, in the Netherlands.

The museum, founded in 1950, is located in a former Dutch Reformed Church. It is named after Betje Wolff. Wolff lived in the building with her husband, Adrian Wolff, who was a pastor. The museum library has a complete collection of all of Betje Wolff's works.

The museum has rooms decorated in period styles of three different centuries. There is an 18th-century garden. It focuses on the lifestyle of residents of Beemster.
