= Laura Postma =

German politician (born 1993)

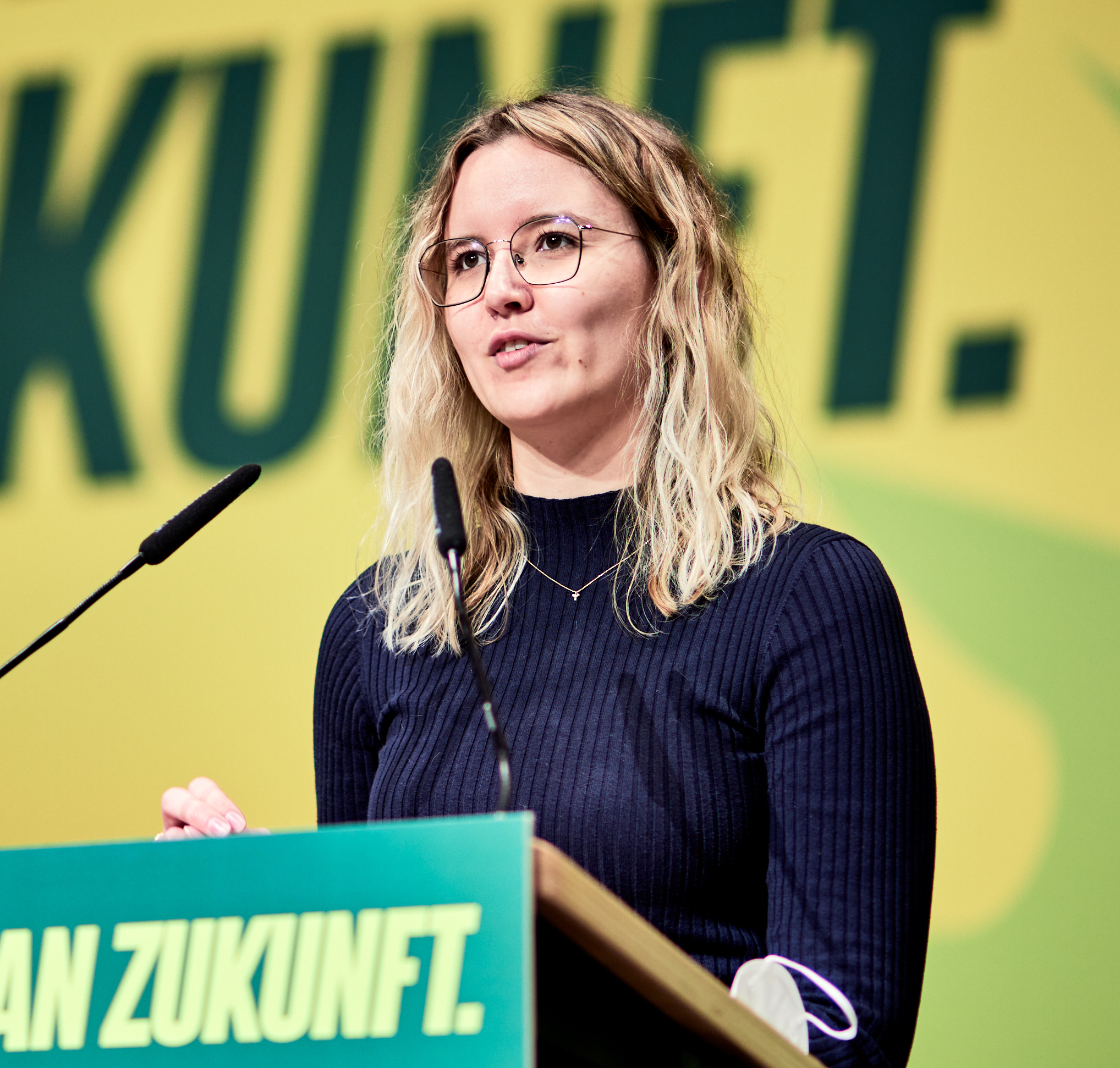
- Postma in 2021

Member of the Landtag of North Rhine-Westphalia
- Incumbent
- Assumed office 1 June 2022

Personal details
- Born: 9 November 1993 (age 32)
- Party: Alliance 90/The Greens (since 2019)

Laura Postma (born 9 November 1993) is a German politician serving as a member of the Landtag of North Rhine-Westphalia since 2022. She has been a city councillor of Herzogenrath and a district councillor of Aachen since 2020.
