= Middenbeemster =

- Town
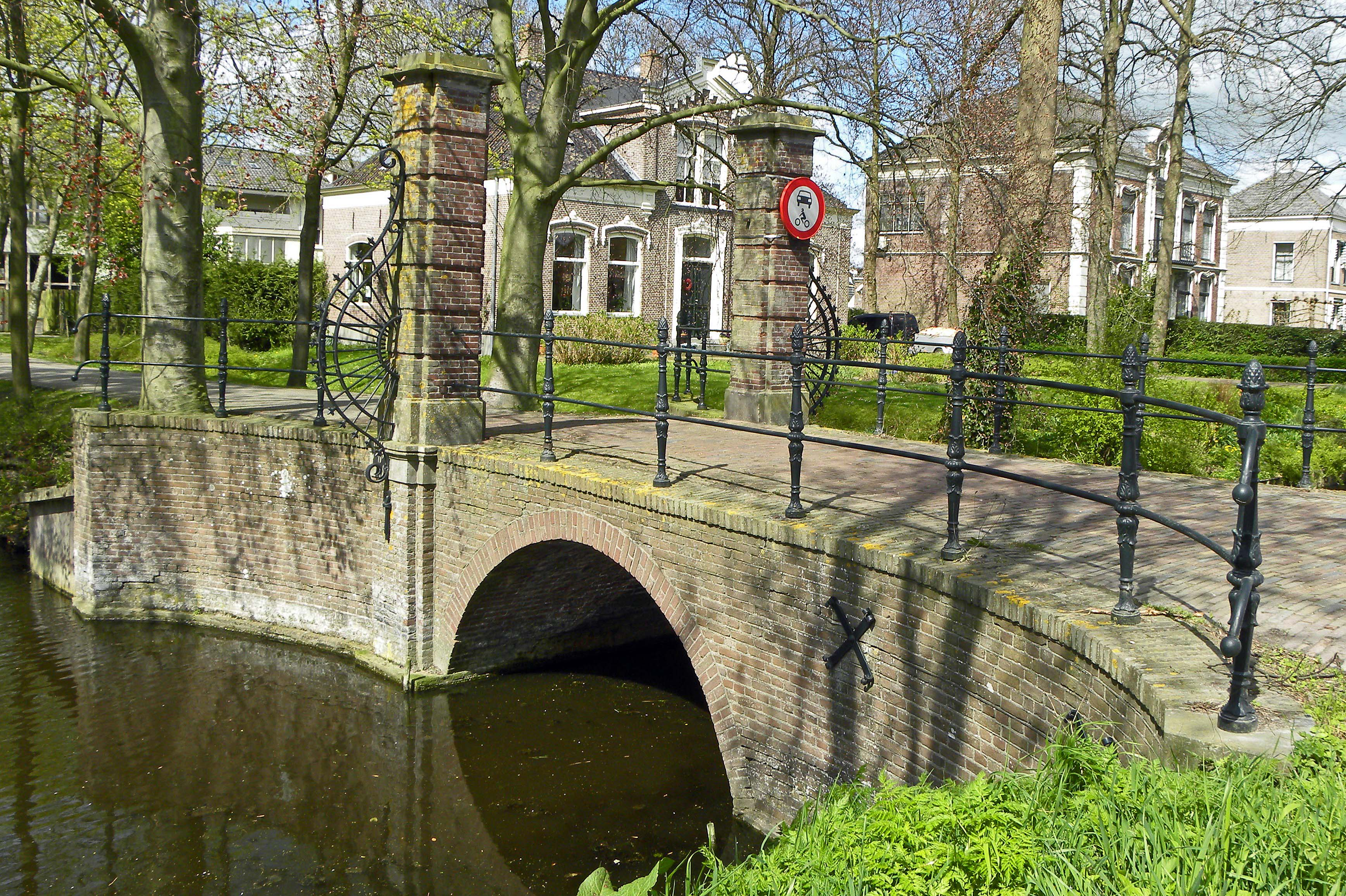

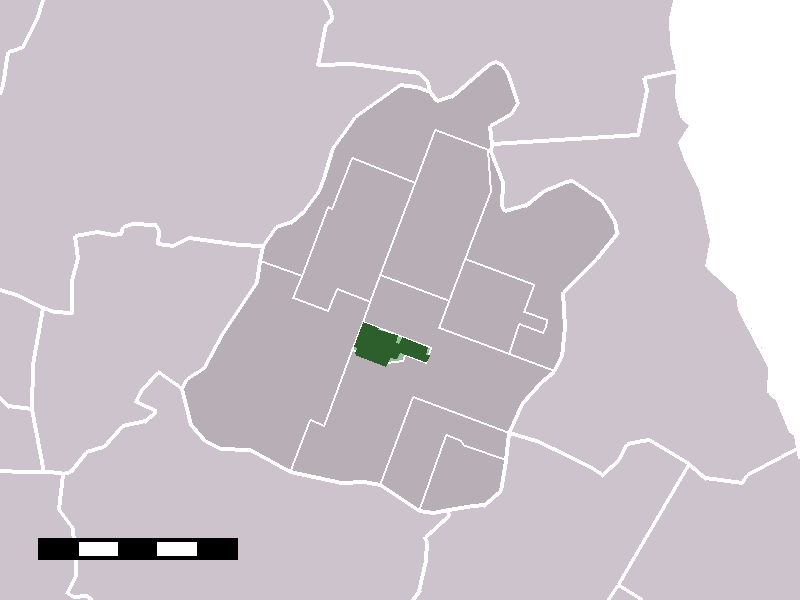
- The town centre (dark green) and the statistical district (light green) of Middenbeemster in the former municipality of Beemster.
- Coordinates: 52°32′54″N 4°55′11″E
- Country: Netherlands
- Province: North Holland
- Municipality: Purmerend

Population (2025)
  - Total: 5,810
- Time zone: UTC+1 (CET)
  - Summer (DST): UTC+2 (CEST)

Middenbeemster is a town in the Dutch province of North Holland. It is a part of the former municipality of Beemster, and lies about 6 km northwest of Purmerend. Since 2022 it has been part of the municipality of Purmerend.

In 2001, the town of Middenbeemster had 3628 inhabitants. The built-up area of the town was 0.82 km², and contained 1404 residences. The slightly larger statistical area "Middenbeemster" has a population of around 5,810. The town is the birthplace of the painter Carel Fabritius.

== Notable residents ==
- Francien de Zeeuw
- Carel Fabritius
