= Teaching a Child to Walk =

Painting by Pieter de Hooch

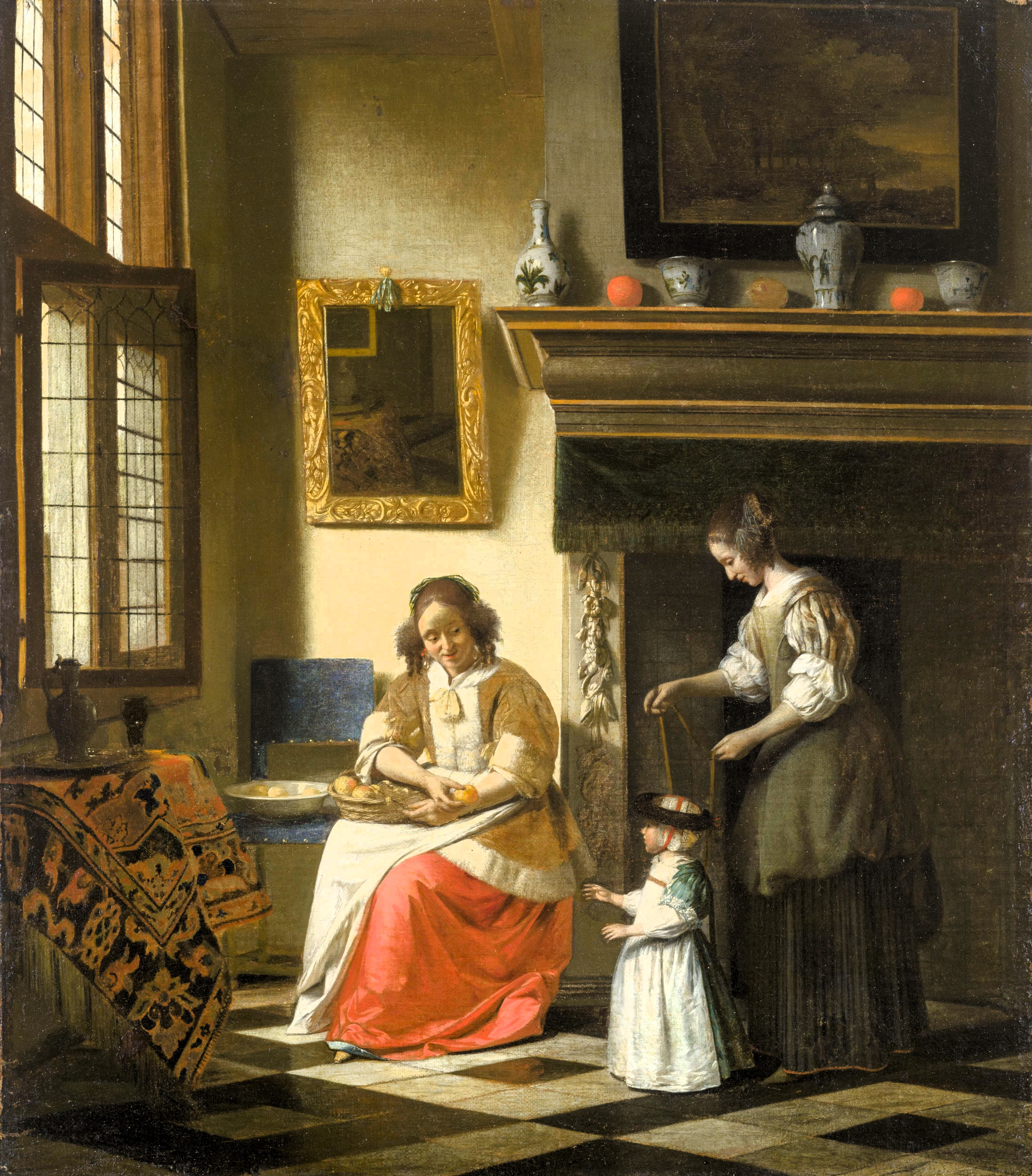
- Artist: Pieter de Hooch
- Year: c. 1668–1672
- Medium: oil on canvas
- Dimensions: 67.5 cm × 59 cm (26.6 in × 23 in)
- Location: Museum der bildenden Künste; Leipzig

Teaching a Child to Walk (c. 1668–1672) is an oil-on-canvas painting by the Dutch painter Pieter de Hooch. It is an example of Dutch Golden Age painting and is part of the collection of the Museum der bildenden Künste, in Leipzig, Germany.

This painting was documented by Hofstede de Groot in 1908, who wrote:

35. TEACHING THE CHILD TO WALK. Sm. 22; deG. 62. In the left-hand corner of a room sits a woman, almost directly facing the spectator. She wears an orange-coloured dress and has a basket of apples on her lap, and a dish of peeled apples on a chair beside her. On the right a servant-girl, with skirt tucked up, is bringing a child in leading-strings. The child stretches its hands towards an apple which the mother holds out. Behind the servant-girl is a fireplace with a pilaster worked in delicate relief; upon the chimney-piece are Chinese porcelain vases, and above it hangs a picture. In the left foreground, below a half-opened window, is a table with an Oriental carpet, upon which are a mug on a tray, and a glass. This part of the room with the lower corner of the open window is reflected in a mirror, which hangs above the woman's head on a wall illumined with yellow light. It is a genuine, though not a very well preserved, picture of the later years of his best period. Signed to the left on the window-frame "P de hooch"; canvas, 26 1/2 inches by 24 inches. Described by Parthey, 1863 (i. 622). Bought in 1811 (for 700 thalers) according to the Ltitzschena catalogue. The picture described by Sm., measuring 24 inches by 20 inches, was in the sale of M. de Sereville, Paris, January 21, 1812 (2000 francs, bought in). Now in the collection of the Freiherr Speck von Sternburg, in Lützschena, No. 204 in the 1889 catalogue. Published in the portfolio of the Photo-graphische Gesellschaft, 1904, No. 31.

The child is wearing a valhoed, or falling cap, and the same child with a falling cap can be seen in de Hooch's Interior with a Child Feeding a Parrot, while the interior itself was used for another scene with the same child pulling impatiently on the skirt of a maidservant:

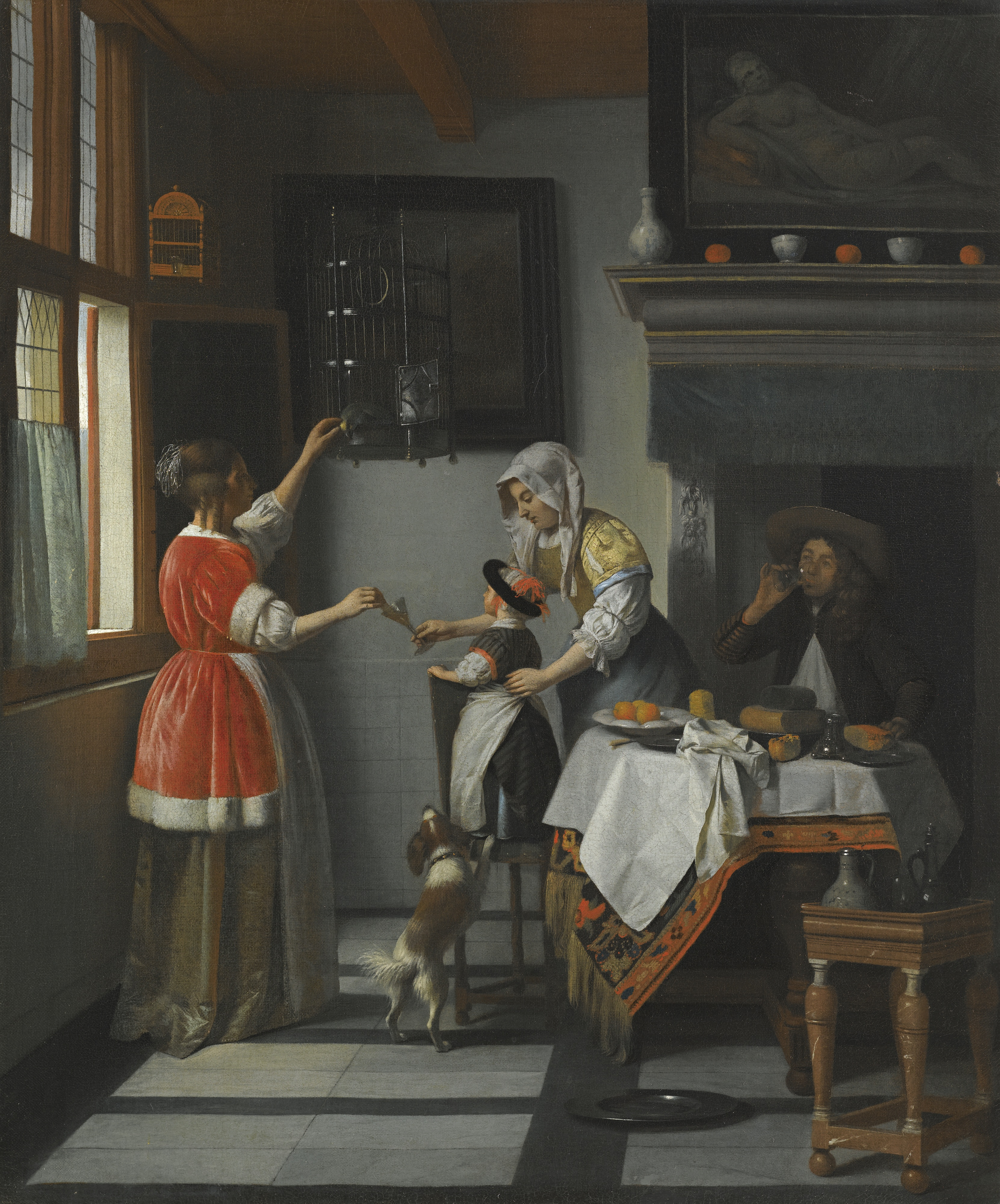
Interior with a Child Feeding a Parrot

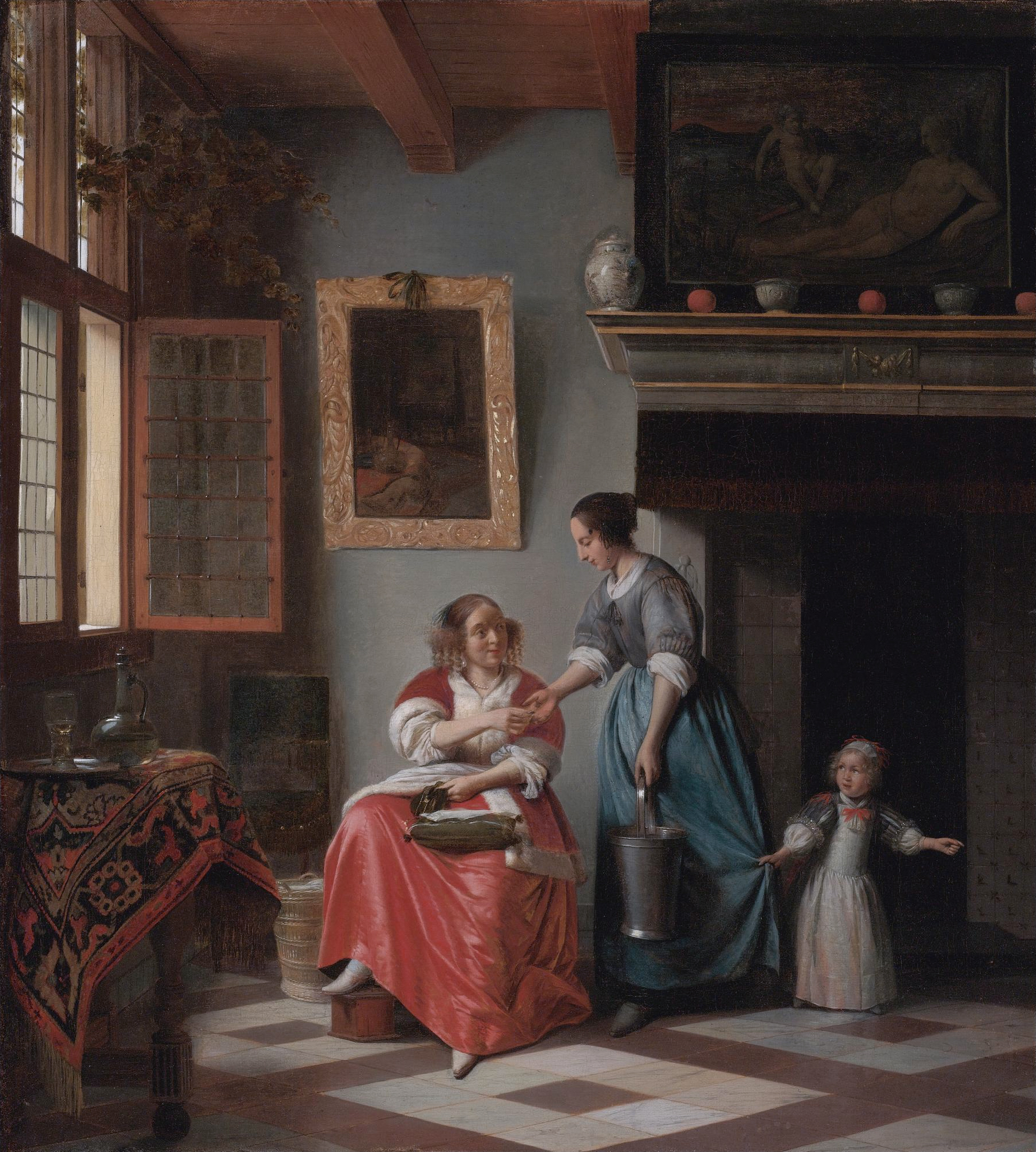
Woman giving Money to a Servant-Girl

== See also ==
- List of paintings by Pieter de Hooch
