= Interior with a Child Feeding a Parrot =

Painting by Pieter de Hooch

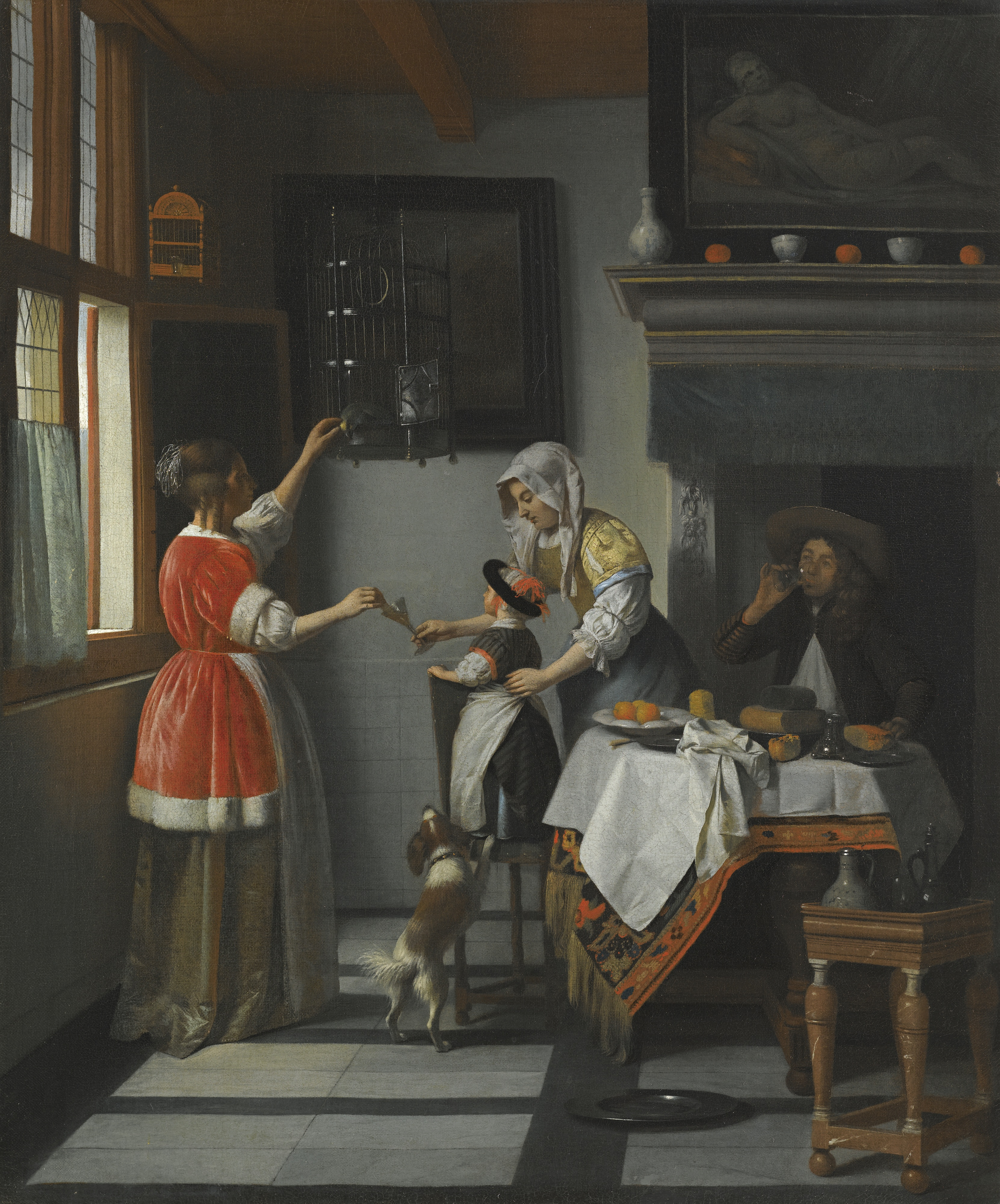
- Artist: Pieter de Hooch
- Year: c. 1668–1672
- Medium: oil on canvas
- Dimensions: 79.5 cm × 66 cm (31.3 in × 26 in)
- Location: Private collection

Interior with a Child Feeding a Parrot (c. 1668–1672) is an oil-on-canvas painting by the Dutch painter Pieter de Hooch. It is an example of Dutch Golden Age painting and is now in a private collection.

This painting was documented by Hofstede de Groot in 1908, who wrote:

113. THE FAVOURITE PARROT. Sm. Suppl. 6; deG. 50. In the left-hand corner of a room stands a table with an Eastern carpet and a white cloth. Upon it are cheese, fruit, plates, and other objects. A young man with a slouch hat sits behind the table, drinking a glass of wine. Behind him is a chimney-piece; upon it stands some Chinese porcelain, and above it hangs a picture of a nude woman recumbent. In the right foreground there are bottles and glasses on a little table, and a silver dish on the floor. At a half-opened window to the left stands a young woman, in a red jacket trimmed with ermine, feeding a parrot, which looks out of its cage-door. The woman scratches the parrot's head with her left hand, and with her right soaks a crust in a wine-glass which a girl, standing more to the right behind the table, holds across to her. With her left hand this girl supports a little child who stands on a chair, watching the parrot being fed. A dog jumps up to the chair. By the window is a bird-cage; behind the parrot there is another picture on the wall. The colouring is cool and clear in tone. Canvas, 31 inches by 27 inches. Mentioned by Waagen (Supplement, p. 99); by Ch. Blanc, Tresor de la Curiosite, ii. 433-4.; and by Havard. Sale. Casimir Perier, Paris, April 18, 1838. In the collection of the Duc de Berri; brought to England in 1840 by Hume. Now in the collection of the Earl of Northbrook, in London.

The child is wearing a valhoed, or falling cap, and the same child with a falling cap can be seen in de Hooch's Teaching a Child to Walk, while the interior itself was used for another scene with the same child pulling impatiently on the skirt of a maidservant:

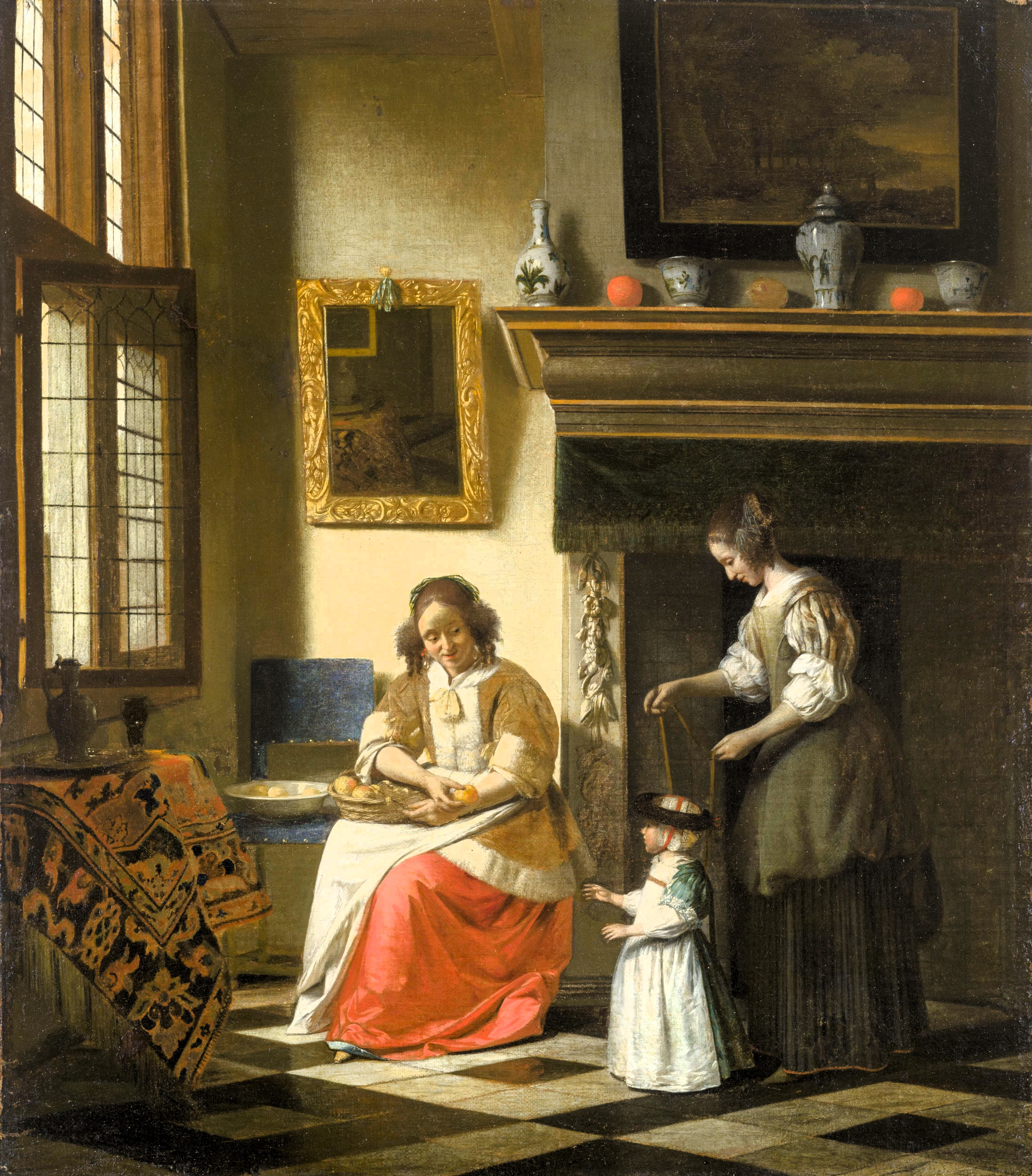
Teaching a Child to Walk

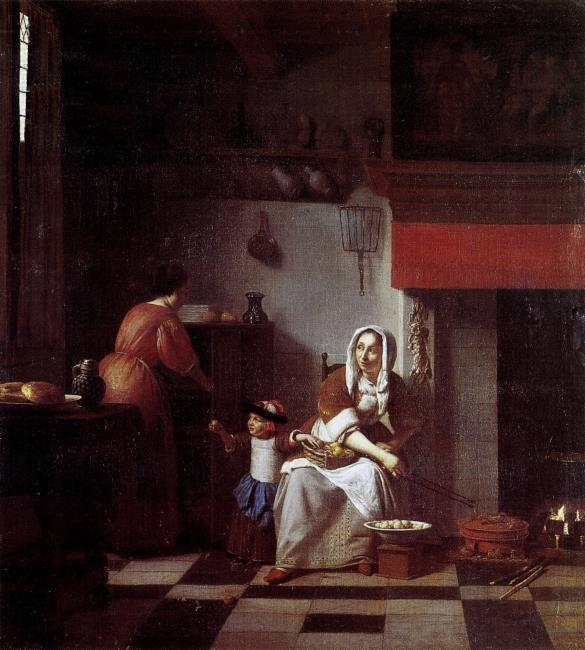
Interior of a Kitchen with a Woman, a Child and a Maid

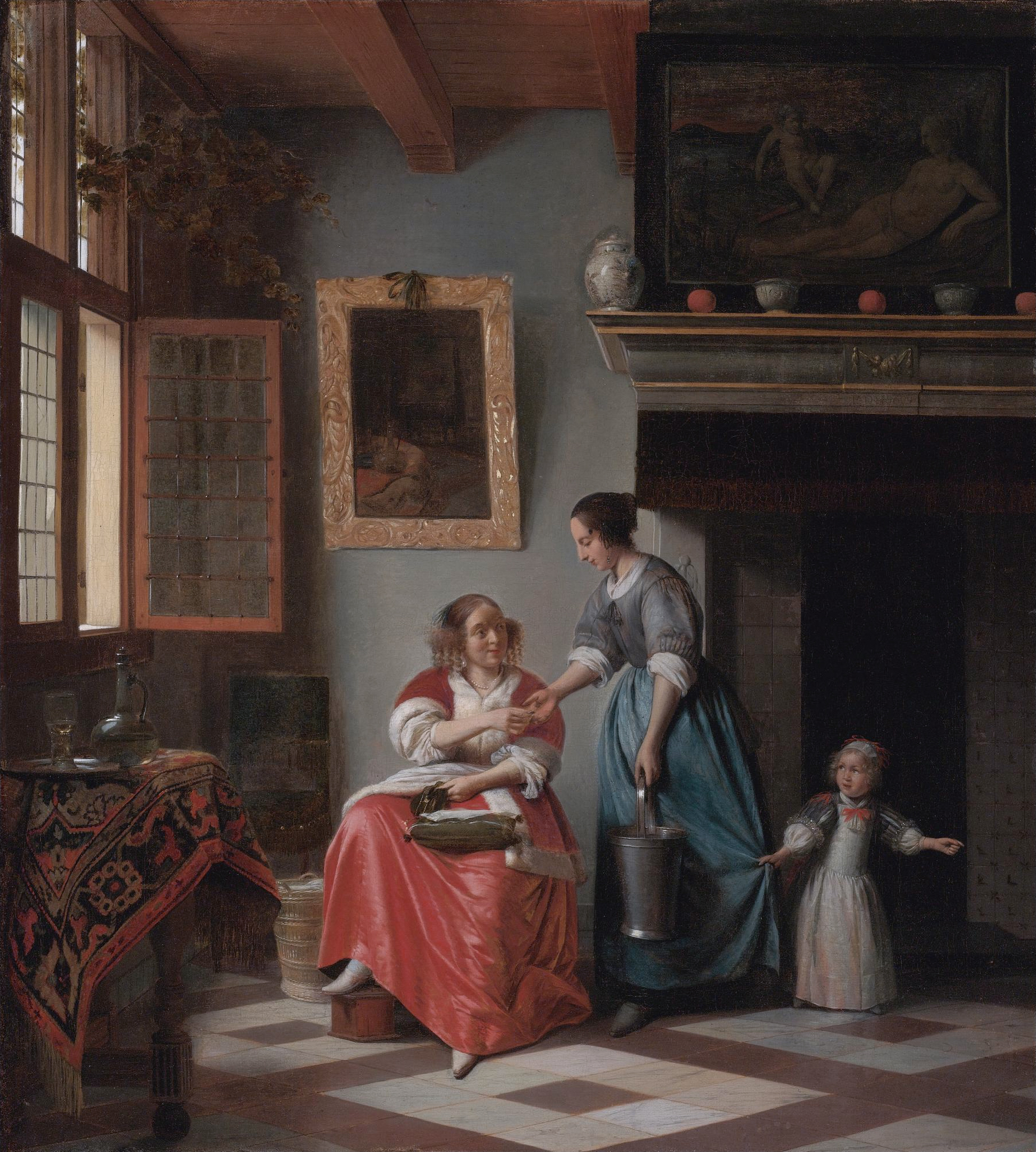
Woman giving Money to a Servant-Girl

This painting was sold by Sotheby's in 2012 for $3,666,500.

== See also ==
- List of paintings by Pieter de Hooch
