= Child harness =

Safety device worn by children

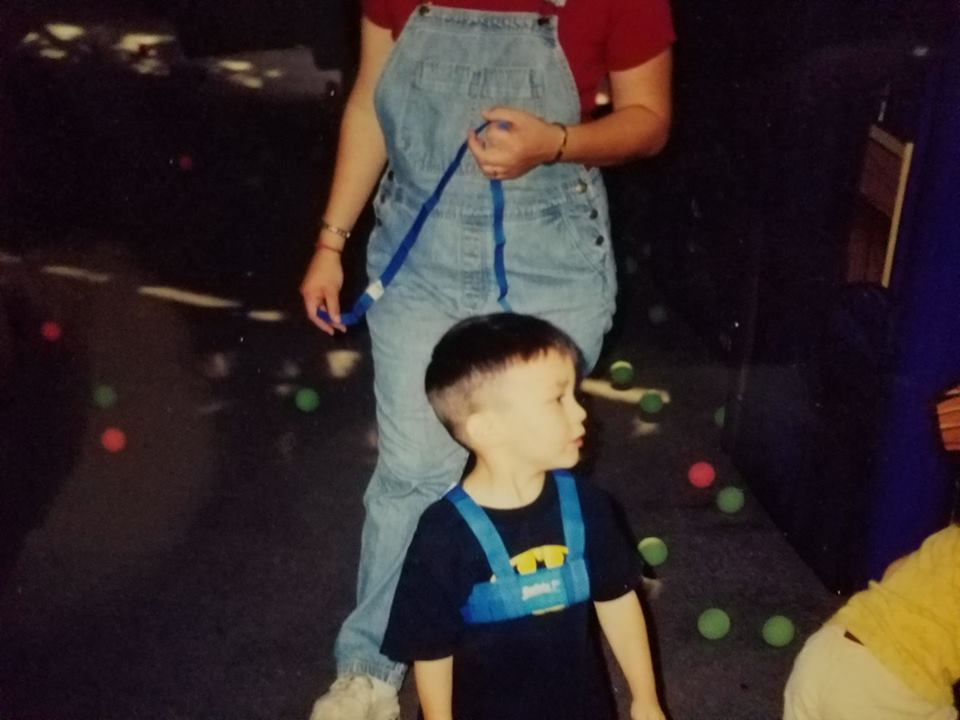
Mother and child with safety harness

A child harness (alternative: child tether, walking harness, British English: walking reins) is a safety device worn by children when walking with a parent or carer. Child harnesses are most commonly used with toddlers and children of preschool age, though they may also be used with older children, especially if they have special supervisory needs such as ADHD or autism. Various types exist, though all are worn by the child and have a lead (tether) or rein which is held by a parent or caregiver. As child harness designs and purposes have evolved with cultural norms and parenting techniques, they have become subject to common debate.

== Use and purpose ==
Child harnesses are designed to provide safety for a child when walking by preventing them from being separated from their parent or caregiver. Additionally, some may be used to help keep a child safely seated in a stroller or high chair. Typically used for children between one and four years of age, the use of child harnesses depends on a variety of factors including the age and maturity of the child, as well as any perceived dangers such as busy roads, large crowds, and potential distractions. Other factors such as neurological and health conditions may also be considered, particularly for older children with unique supervisory requirements.

== History ==
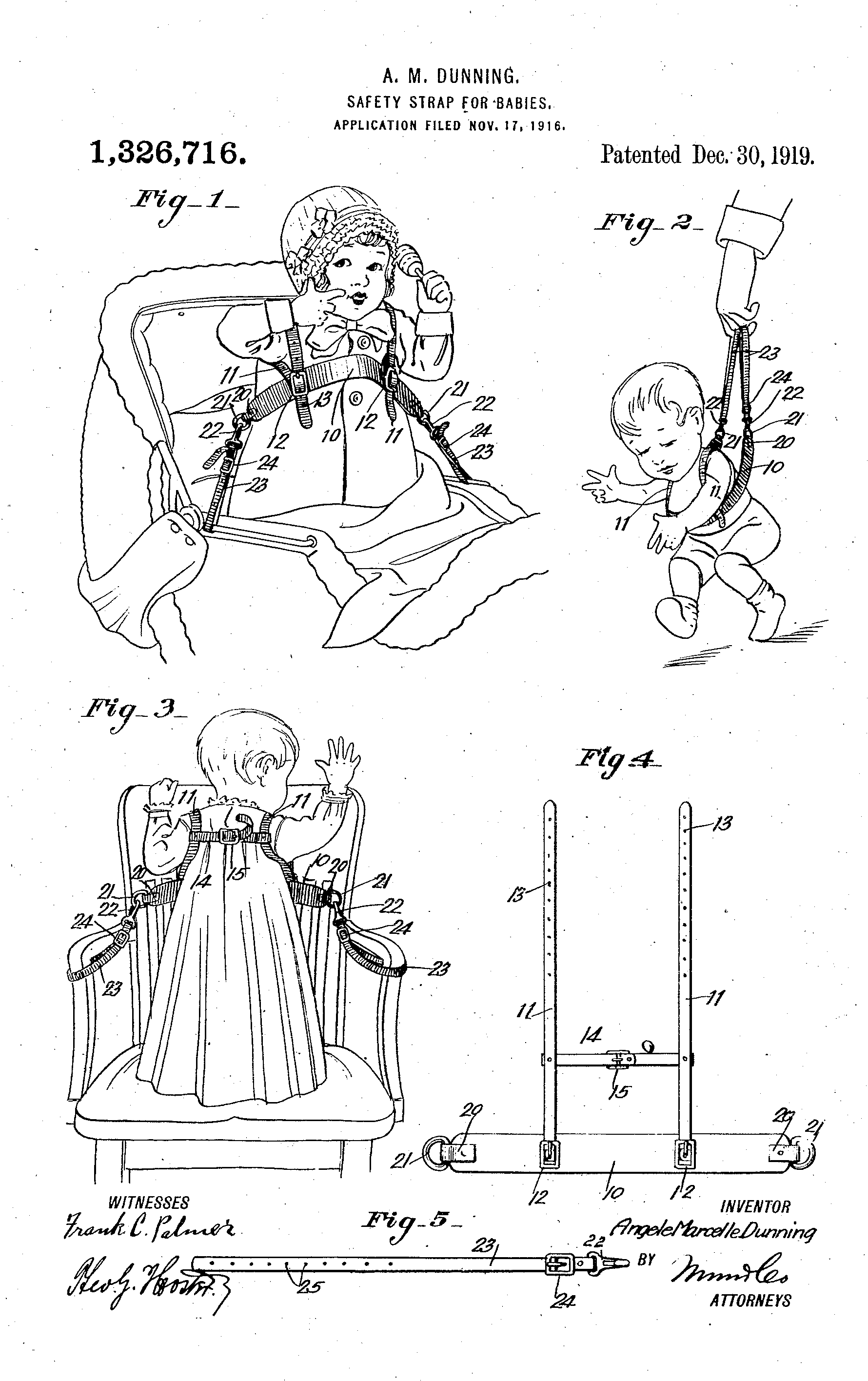
Technical drawing of an early twentieth-century design of child safety harness

=== Pre-1900 ===
While there is little documentation on child harnesses before the twentieth century, they may have emerged from leading strings used during the seventeenth and eighteenth centuries. In the late nineteenth century, evidence suggests they were mostly considered as items of clothing, primarily worn by young children learning to walk. The "Baby-Exercising Corset" patented in New Jersey in 1874 aimed to "enable them to learn to walk much sooner, and much more readily, than they could with out[sic] its use."

=== Early 20th century ===
After 1900, designs evolved from a type of garment into dedicated safety harnesses most commonly "in the form of a waist belt, shoulder straps connecting the waist belt...and a suspending strap for a person to sustain the weight of the child." While earlier patent applications for child harnesses mention protection from potential dangers, designs beginning in the twentieth century were "particularly directed to the prevention of injury." With the transition towards safety as the main priority, designs changed "to provide a readily applicable harness for retaining a child in standing position in a chair, go-cart, or the like, and thereby obviating the danger of the child falling." Harnesses at this time were usually made of leather, and some designs also had small bells attached.

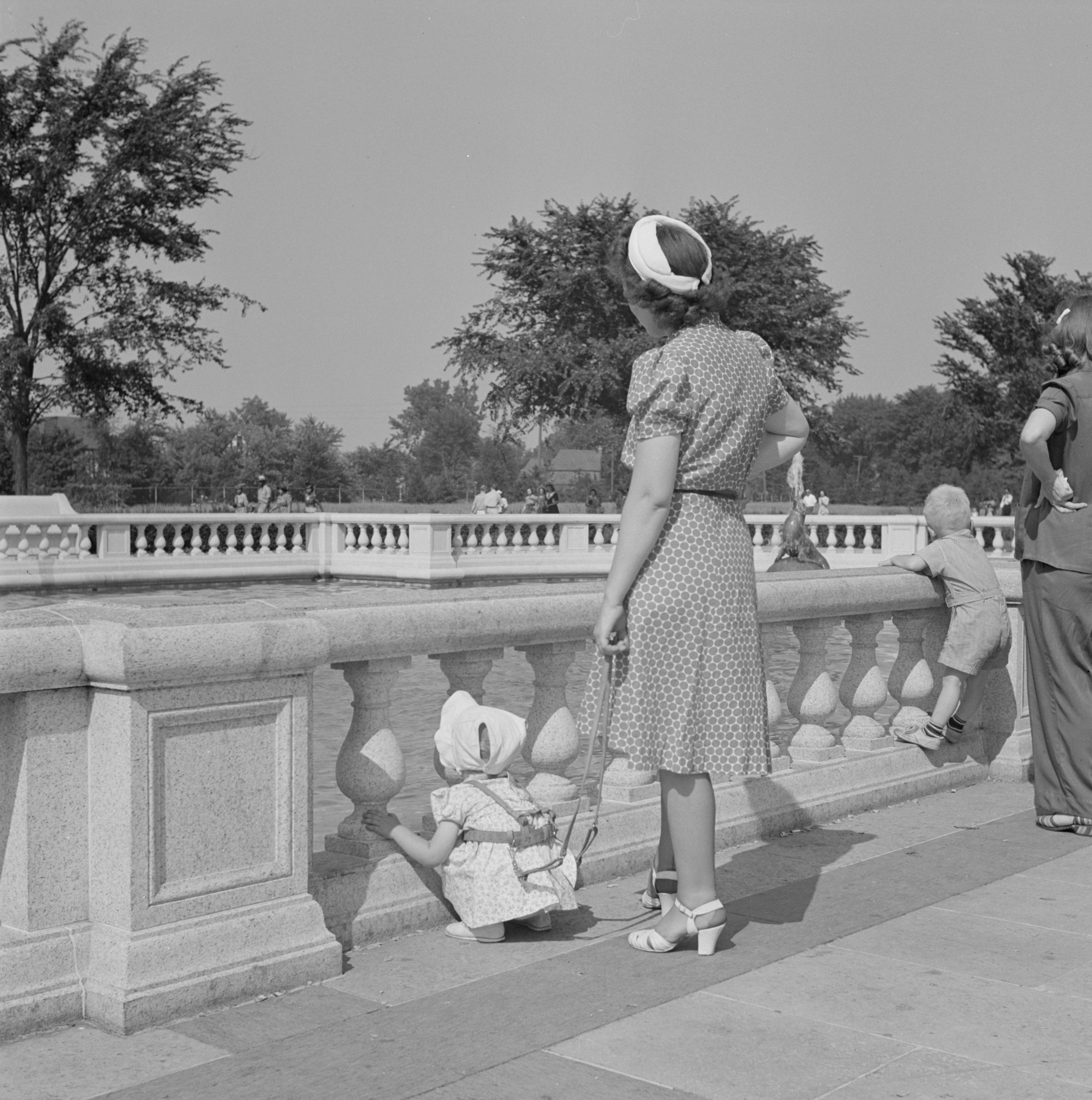
Child wearing a safety harness at the Detroit Zoological Park, Michigan, USA, 1942. Photograph by Arthur Siegel.

=== 1940s–1980s ===
By the 1940s in the United Kingdom, child harnesses were fairly common. Designs in the United Kingdom and the United States began to change in the 1950s with the straps being made of webbing instead of leather, and purposely designed fittings to make the harnesses easier to use for parents and caregivers.

In the mid-1950s, various local campaign groups in the United Kingdom began to recommend the use of child harnesses as part of road safety campaigns. In addition to recommendations, the campaigns also focused on abolishing the thirty-percent sales tax payable on child harnesses, arguing removing the tax would be "a sign that the Government was sincerely interested in the safety of young children." The debate around possible legislation for child harnesses continued into the 1960s, with the British Standards Institute issuing new safety standards. The "stringent specifications" sought to address the "harnesses on the market which were not sufficiently strong to restrain a bouncing baby in a pram, or to take the weight of a falling toddler," with all designs after November 1964 being subject to "rigorous performance tests" for both design and materials.

Designs advanced further in the 1960s with Roland Cheetham (W.H. Cheetham & Sons Limited) inventing the first terylene webbing harness in 1961. Going on sale in 1962, the new webbing material had "a high resistance...to abrasion and moisture" with the company claiming the design was "virtually ever-lasting." The new materials were lighter than previous versions, and the company also claimed the material was more hygienic as the harness could be washed and dried in five minutes. The new design was awarded the certificate of the Royal Institute of Public Health and Hygiene. The design also featured improved fittings "so that the mother does not have to bother with buckles" and could "vary the size easily." The harness was sold in four different colors with a suggested retail price of twelve shillings and sixpence.

Child harness designs remained largely unchanged between the 1970s and 1990s, the most significant change being the replacement of metal parts with plastic parts. The most notable exception, patented in 1987, was the "wrist link" or "wrist strap" which dispensed with the chest harness section, instead consisting of a length of webbing with a loop at each end. One loop secures around the wrist of the child, while the other is held by the parent or caregiver. The idea was to address how parents and/or caregivers could find it "very impractical to use one hand to hold the child at all times" and thus "leaves the parent's hands free." The wrist link/strap design was also noted to be "adaptable to children of any size or age". Other hands-free adaptions to the established designs of child harnesses were also developed in the late 1980s.

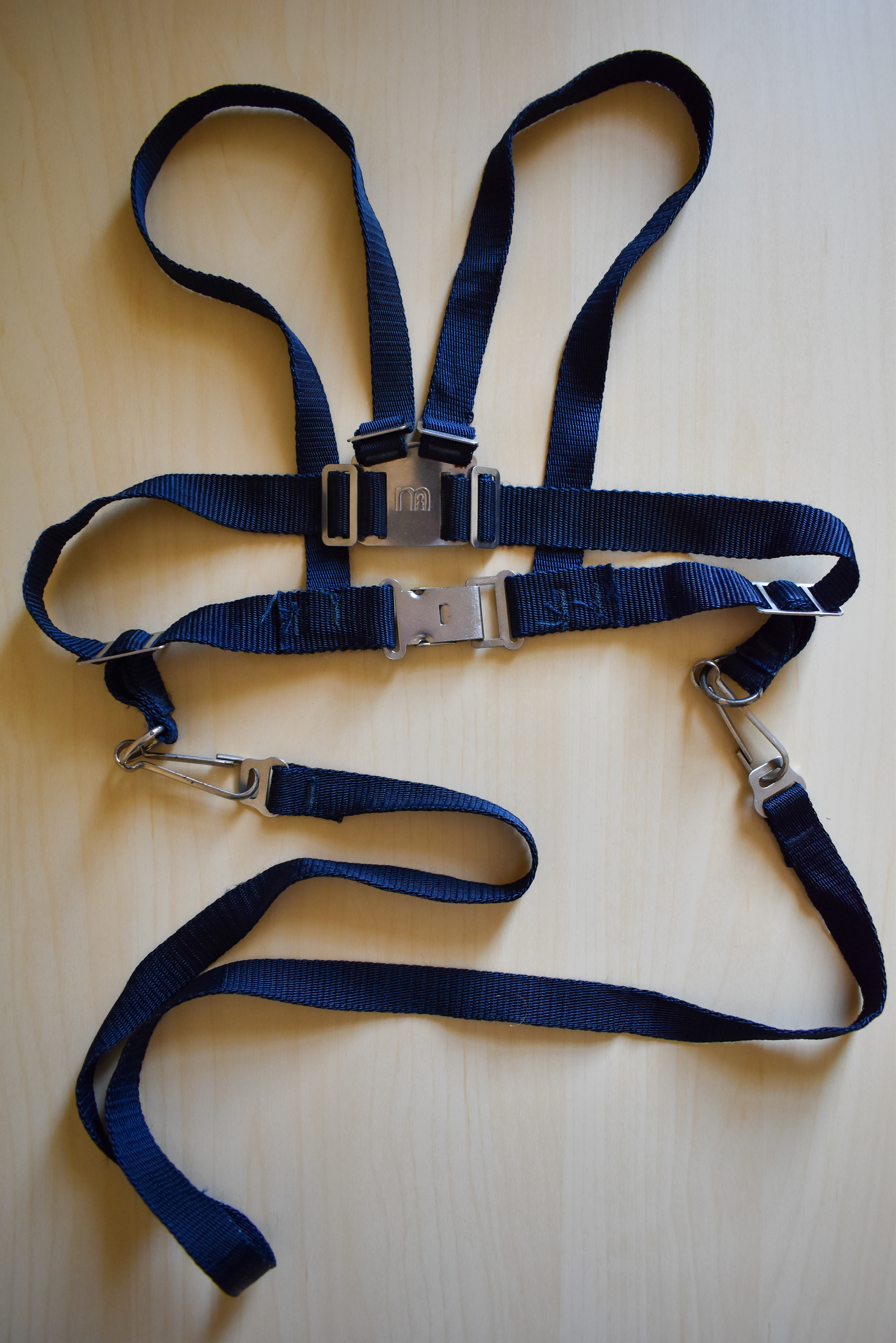
Typical 1970s child harness from the United Kingdom

=== Post-1990 ===
In the United Kingdom, following the 1993 James Bulger murder case, sales of child harnesses "dramatically increased" and some stores sold out when "trying desperately to meet demand." Two years later, child harnesses were recommended by the Child Accident Prevention Trust as part of their "Seven Steps for Safety Campaign."

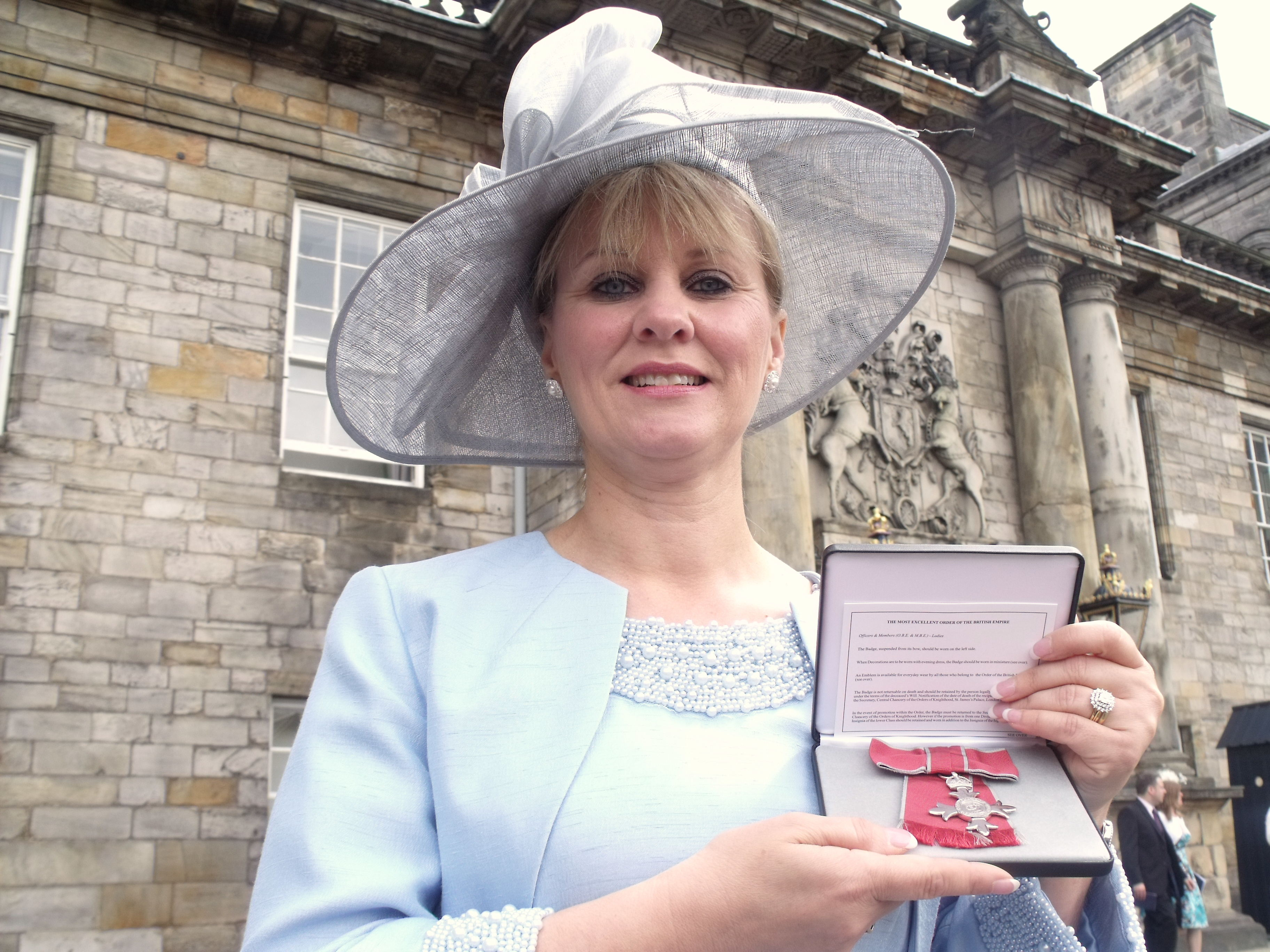
Elaine Stephen pictured with her MBE for Services to Child Safety in 2011

In 2005, after a largely standardized design for forty years, an alternative design for child harnesses was created which merged the basic strap elements with a soft toy. The new design, developed by Goldbug, Inc. in the United States, evolved into "a backpack...in the form of a novelty character of animal or human form" which also included a "storage pouch" with "the shoulder and waist straps of the harness representing the limbs or extremities of the character, and a tether attached to the harness in the form of a character tail." The alternative designs, which included a variety of popular soft toys such as monkeys, giraffes, and teddy bears, were developed and marketed as "Harness Buddies" to discourage any objections of a child to wearing a safety harness through providing more comfort, padding, and overall novelty.

In 2007, Scottish primary school teacher Elaine Stephen, MBE launched the Walkodile harness. The design, developed in partnership with The Design Unit at De Montfort University, was the first child harness which could be used for multiple children, allowing for two or more children to walk together side-by-side. Each child has their own simplified safety belt which can be attached to any connection point located on an extendable modular section which is located between the parallel rows of children.

In May 2014, British retailer Boots was criticized for its range of child harnesses as some felt the colors and designs reinforced traditional gender roles. The company sold two harnesses; a blue version with the words "Train Driver" and another pink version which featured the words "Little Cupcake" specifically labelled as a "Girls Walking Rein and Harness". After a consumer photo of the harnesses went viral, the retailer responded by promising to change the packaging to demonstrate their "commitment to prevent gender stereotyping."

== Types ==
=== Standard harness ===
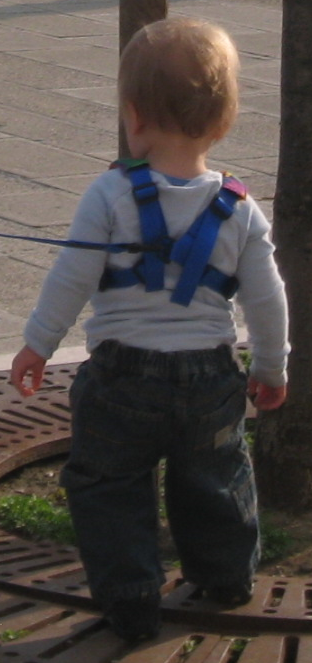
Child wearing a regular-style harness

The standard design usually consists of a waist or chest strap and two shoulder straps forming a simple chest harness, most commonly with the closure behind the child. A walking lead, tether, or rein attaches at the back or sides of the chest harness and is held by the parent or caregiver behind the child. This design is sometimes used to safely secure a child in a stroller or high chair as well as for walking. The most historically established design, standard style child harnesses are made of either leather or webbing and are primarily sold for children between four years of age or younger.

=== Character harness ===
Character harnesses integrate the functions of the standard child harness and a soft toy. Some designs are based around simple generic soft toy characters such as monkeys, teddy bears, or bunnies; while others are based around well-known children's entertainment characters. Character harnesses share the same basic features as standard child harnesses, but often have a front closure and are designed to be more appealing for the child, parent, and/or caregiver via additional comfort and novelty. Some also feature small storage pockets.

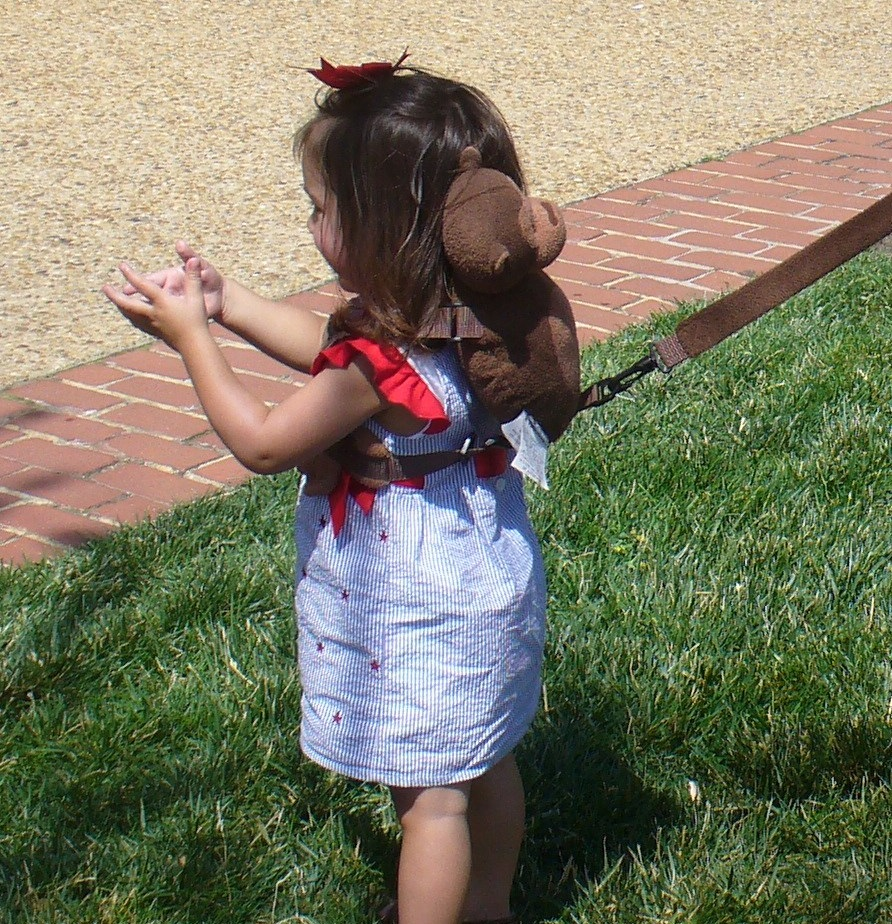
Child wearing a character harness

=== Backpack harness ===
Backpack harnesses integrate the functions of a standard child harness and a backpack. Designs are generally based around a basic backpack, suitably sized for a child with a connection for a lead or tether. Like character harnesses, backpack harnesses usually feature closures at the front of the harness and are marketed as an alternative to standard child harnesses for a similar age group.

=== Wrist link ===
A wrist link (sometimes called a wrist strap or wrist rein), is a simple length of webbing with two loops; one at each end. One loop is worn on the child's wrist and the other is held by the parent or caregiver. Usually, the loops are adjustable for size and the strap often features an elastic section to prevent injury by absorbing shock from any sudden movements. Some wrist links use a strong coiled line instead of webbing or elastic. Wrist links are sometimes marketed as suitable for those in the "junior" age range and are occasionally worn by children who may have outgrown the standard or backpack style child harnesses.

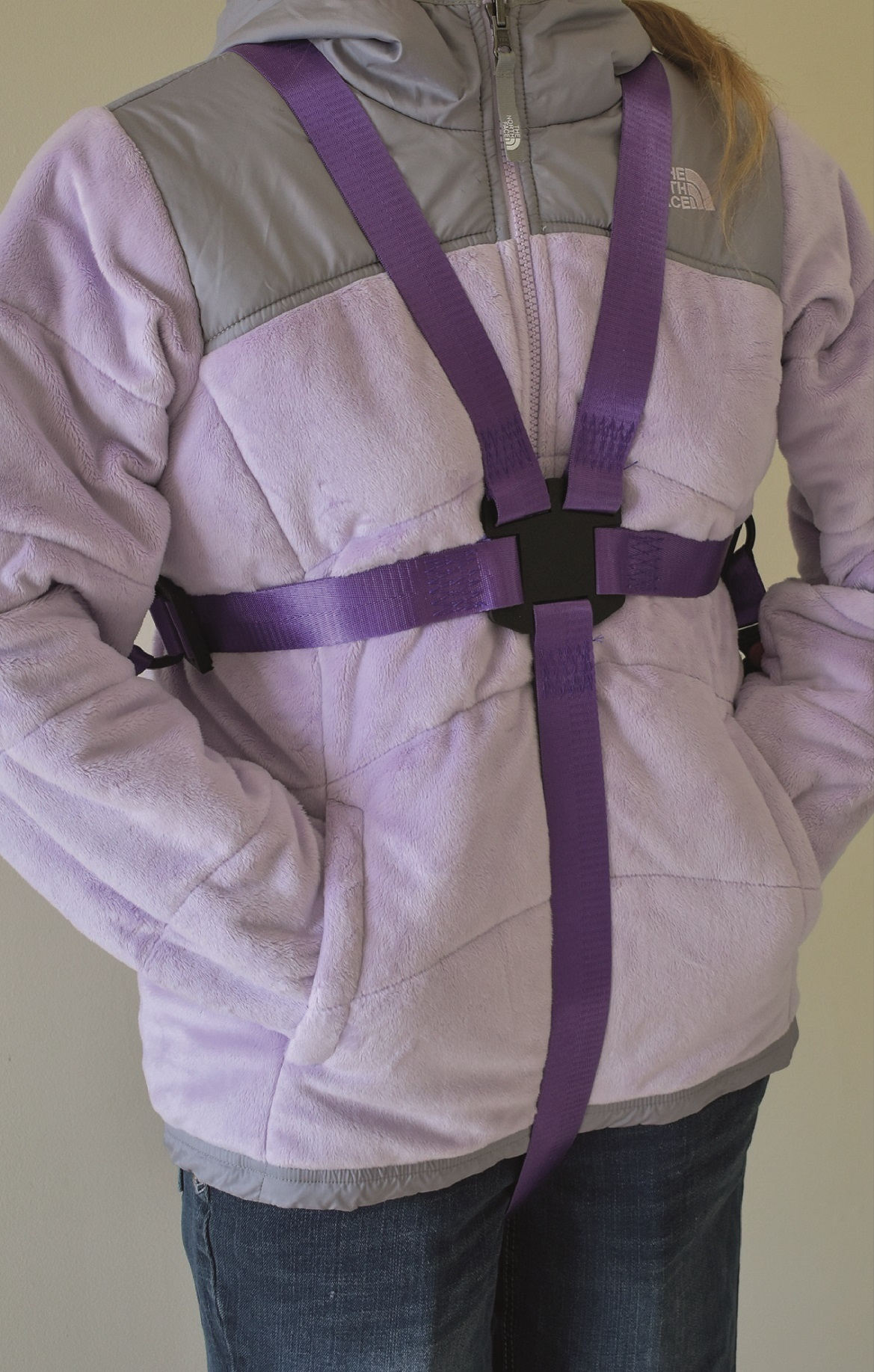
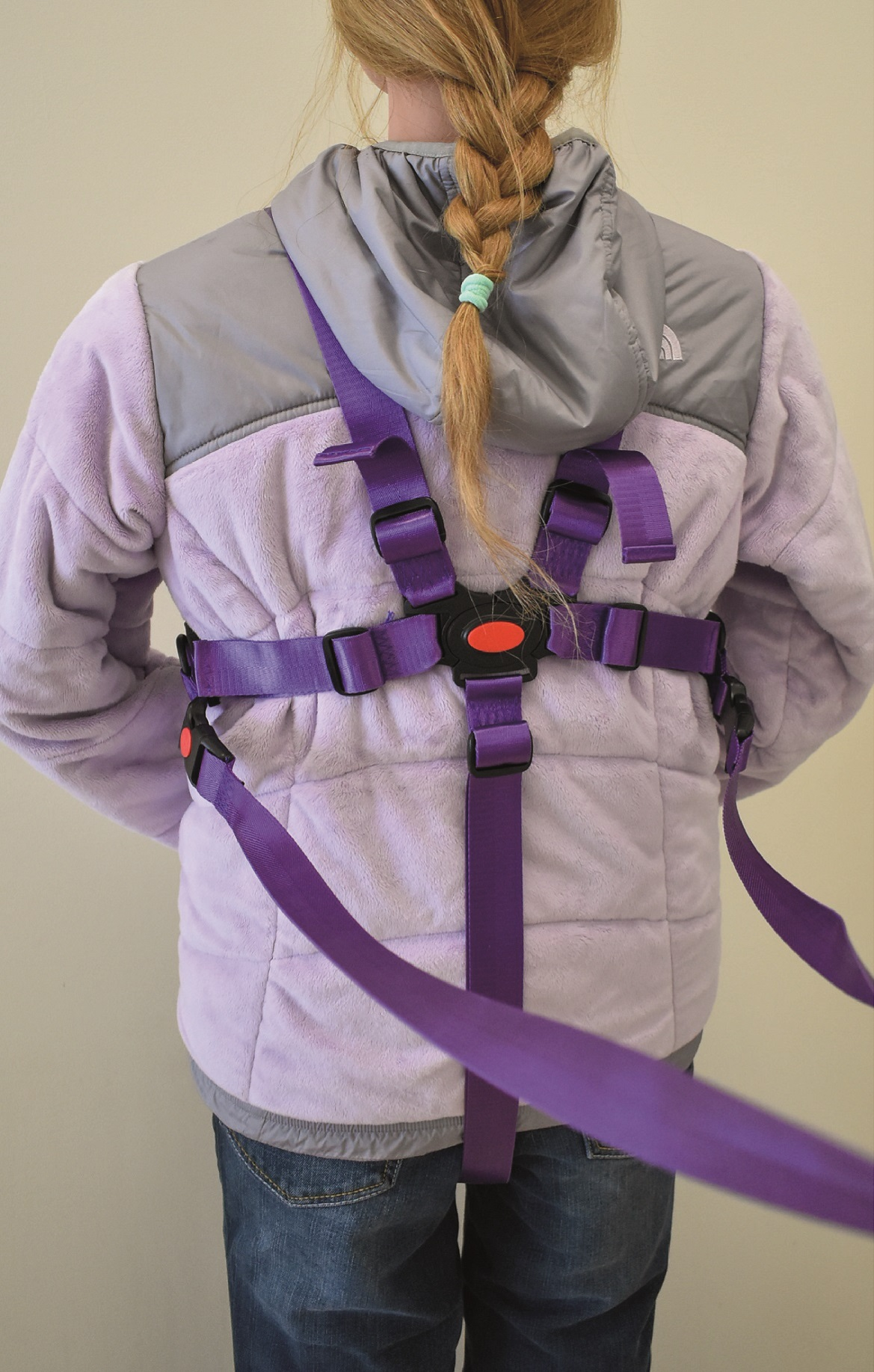
Teenager wearing a special needs child harness

=== Special needs harness ===
For older children and adolescents who have special supervision requirements due to health or behavioral conditions, larger, and sometimes bespoke, versions of child harnesses are available. These designs vary, but often include features atypical of standard child harnesses designed for younger kids such as support handles, lockable closures, and additional straps to prevent removal.

=== Sports/recreational harness ===
While not designed for everyday use, some specialist child harnesses exist for specific recreational purposes such as hiking or skiing. These types of harnesses feature unique elements such as longer leads to assist children in sports training techniques.

== Common debate ==
There is some disagreement about the use of child harnesses which focuses on a number of aspects including safety, physical health, mental development/behavior, as well as parenting philosophies and styles. Opinion is divided among parents (and non-parents) but also among childcare and educational professionals.

=== Safety ===
Those who use or suggest using child harnesses say that they provide more safety for the child, especially for more active children. Parents and caregivers who advocate using child harnesses cite the impulsivity of toddlers or young children to unknowingly put themselves in danger as a main reason for their use. Some childcare professionals cite the preventative principle of child harnesses to help avert situations where the child might place themselves at risk. A 1991 report in the Archives of Disease in Childhood journal stated that six childhood fatalities which occurred within the Greater London and Birmingham areas of the United Kingdom could have been prevented by the use of child harnesses (reins). For those involved in childcare who believe that "care and safety is their number one priority," harnesses can be "the best option" in some circumstances.

Others contend that the safety benefits of child harnesses are minimal, or at least unknown according to studies. In 2019, Benjamin Hoffman, the Chair of the Injury Prevention Council at the American Academy of Pediatrics stated that there was no "data on injuries associated with [safety] leashes" and that there was a "lack information about why parents use them, and what any benefit might be," adding that "from an injury standpoint" there are potential concerns over entanglement or choking similar to the cords on window blinds and that "there's also the risk of accidentally tripping your child with the tether." Other medical professionals have also stated that certain designs of child harnesses such as the wrist link/strap maybe potentially dangerous for children as they do not provide adequate physical support when needed and also require a degree of cooperation from the child which may be intermittent.

=== Physical health ===
Those who use, or agree with the use of child harnesses, often contend that they improve the physical health of child by allowing them to walk and thereby provide opportunities for exercise. These arguments are especially prevalent when the use of child harnesses is compared to the time a child might otherwise spend in a stroller and thus not able to walk (or jog or run). A 2001 textbook aimed at students studying for the Child Development GCSE states that "walking reins with a safety harness are essential for toddlers, as they can experience walking skills while remaining under the control of an adult." The 2019 OCR handbook for the Cambridge National qualification in Child Development lists child harnesses as a "key factor" in considering the right equipment to "promote the well-being and development" of children aged between one and five years.

Those who oppose child harnesses on grounds of physical health often cite the risk of injury and/or misuse of harnesses. Such concerns include how some parents or caregivers might "tug on the tether or drag the child." Additionally, some individuals who oppose the use of child harnesses often contend they function as a "leash" to restrict movement and therefore offer negligible, little, or even reduced physical health benefits compared to children who are able to explore beyond the limits of movement which harnesses create. Furthermore, some opponents contend child harnesses operate as a substitute for rule making which can result in parents generating (albeit knowingly or unknowingly) "more freedom to be less present" and reduce their awareness of their child's behavior in "potentially dangerous places".

=== Mental development/behavior ===
Advocates and users of child harnesses argue that harnesses allow a safe range of exploration for the child, as well as being a useful "communication tool and teaching method to help children learn to stay beside their parent or caregiver" and thus assist them in understanding boundaries, recognizing potential dangers, and when exploration maybe unsafe or improper. Proponents claim that when used in the appropriate "manner as a teaching tool" harnesses will "not have a negative effect" on the child. Additionally, some supporters of child harness use have cited their own memories of how wearing a harness could be a form of enjoyment or play. In certain circumstances, child harnesses are also recommended by professionals specializing in the health of special needs children whose supervisory requirements may be different from those of neurotypical children.

Many who oppose child harnesses view them as a tool which delays or restricts learning and mental development about rules and potential dangers. Some contend child harnesses are substitute "babysitters," a way for parents or caregivers to "check out," and equate to a "short-term, Band-Aid" solution which results in parents not teaching children important safety and cultural rules. Some psychologists have argued that child harnesses limit the natural curiosity of young children and prohibit them from acquiring skills in self-control which subsequently reduces their ability to understand and respect rules as they grow older. Additionally, other psychologists contend child harnesses could be a source of embarrassment for the child.

=== Parenting/caregiver philosophy/style ===
The advocacy or disapproval of child harnesses is also determined by parenting styles and beliefs.

Parents and caregivers who use child harnesses often cite safety as the primary reason for doing so, fearing losing contact with the child. However, for some the use of child harnesses is only a temporary and/or reserve measure during the education and generation of trust in a child. Once the child has proved they have learned such knowledge "the use of the tether can be faded" showing that "when used short term and in a loving manner as a teaching tool" a harness "should not have a negative effect on the child." Some parents and caregivers also claim that the use of harnesses can be more comfortable for the child as having to raise their arm to hold their parent's hand for extended periods can be uncomfortable. Similarly, some parents argue that compared to having their child in a stroller, using a harness allows for more awareness of their child's needs or wants. Equally, some parents have also observed that their children are more positive and happier during outdoor activity when wearing a harness compared to being a stroller, and that using a child harness "has more to do with how it reflects on us as parents than how it actually affects our children." Additionally, some argue if a "parent experiences a lot of anxiety" to such an extent that "it interferes with them taking their children outdoors or on other events" if "the tether increases the parents' feelings of competence and allows the child to go places ... than tethering could be beneficial" for both adult and child.

Those who disapprove of child harnesses argue that their use can be socially degrading for children "like treating a child like a dog or an animal" which results in others possibly perceiving "a parent who can't control her toddler." Such viewpoints claim that making and enforcing appropriate rules is the primary job of the parent and a child harness avoids such responsibilities. Other childcare specialists have also raised concerns over the effect on the confidence of parents and caregivers with the "worst part of using these harnesses and wrist links are the stares that you get from other people who don't understand that they are a safety precaution." Others have expressed similar concerns regarding how such "reactions could negatively impact a child" as well as the parent or caregiver as "the stigma from being stared at ... could play a larger role in traumatizing the child than the correct use of a tether." Some have also drawn philosophical parallels between using child harnesses for toddlers and the use of GPS and smartphone tracking apps for older children. These arguments contend that children benefit when having to solve problems alone or by seeking appropriate help, neither of which are possible if the child has a permanent form attachment to their parent or caregiver.

== Governmental and regulatory positions ==
=== European Union and United Kingdom ===
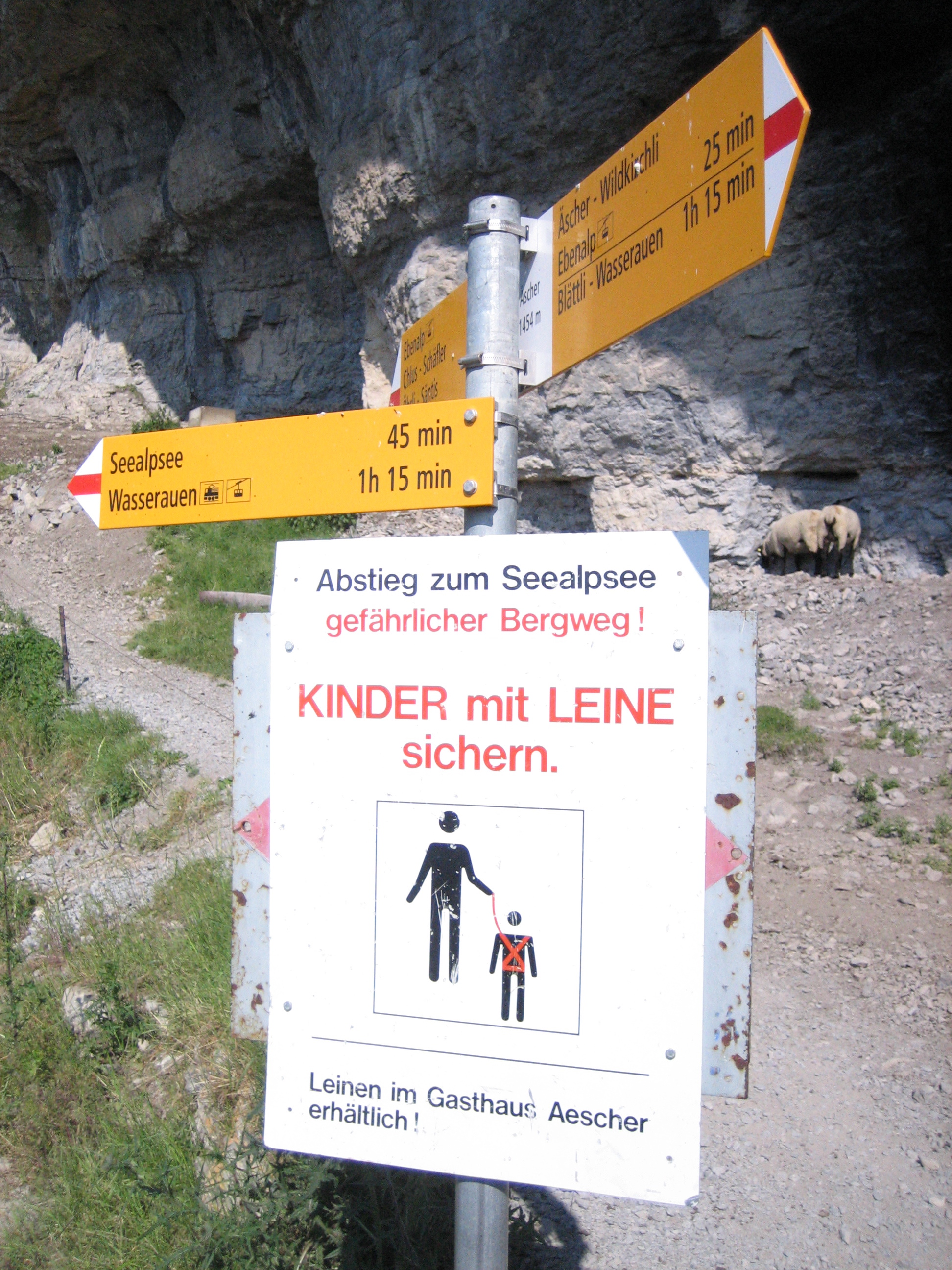
This sign at the start of a dangerously steep mountain trail in Switzerland says to secure children with a safety harness.

Regulations can be traced back to old British Standards for mass-manufactured child harnesses. These British regulations were further developed within the European Union, where the harnesses must comply with the safety requirements as defined in the EN13210:2004 "Children's harnesses, reins and similar type articles" standard. These rules cover a range of attributes such as strength, durability, use of small parts, shapes of components, substances or chemicals used for manufacturing, safety markings, and instructional information on safe use. They also define testing procedures. This European Standard still has the status of a British Standard (BS EN 13210:2004) in the UK.

A new version of the standard is under preparation in the EU; it will split into Part 1 (Children's harnesses, reins – Safety requirements and test methods) and Part 2 (Children's harnesses incorporating backpacks and reins – Safety requirements and test methods).

In 2013, the European Child Safety Alliance (Eurosafe) recommended that a child harness approved to the EN13210:2004 safety standard will provide additional safety for children when using a second-hand stroller not yet equipped with a five-point harness.

As of 2019, rule four of the Highway Code of the United Kingdom, recommends that parents or caregivers use child harnesses (reins) for very young pedestrian children when walking alongside or crossing roads as a possible alternative to a pushchair (stroller) to ensure safety.

The use of such child harnesses is sometimes recommended by local authorities in certain areas where risk and potential dangers to children are considered much higher than usual. These include areas such as mountain paths which are steep or unpredictable underfoot thereby posing an increase of slipping or falling to young children or children inexperienced walking on such terrain.

=== Other regions ===
In the United States, the standards, safety, and potential recall process for child harnesses is overseen by the United States Consumer Product Safety Commission. In Australia, parallel standards of safety are developed and enforced through the Australian Product Safety System, overseen by the Australian Competition & Consumer Commission.

== See also ==
- Leading strings
- Stroller
- High chair
