= Woman Giving Money to a Servant-Girl =

Painting by Pieter de Hooch

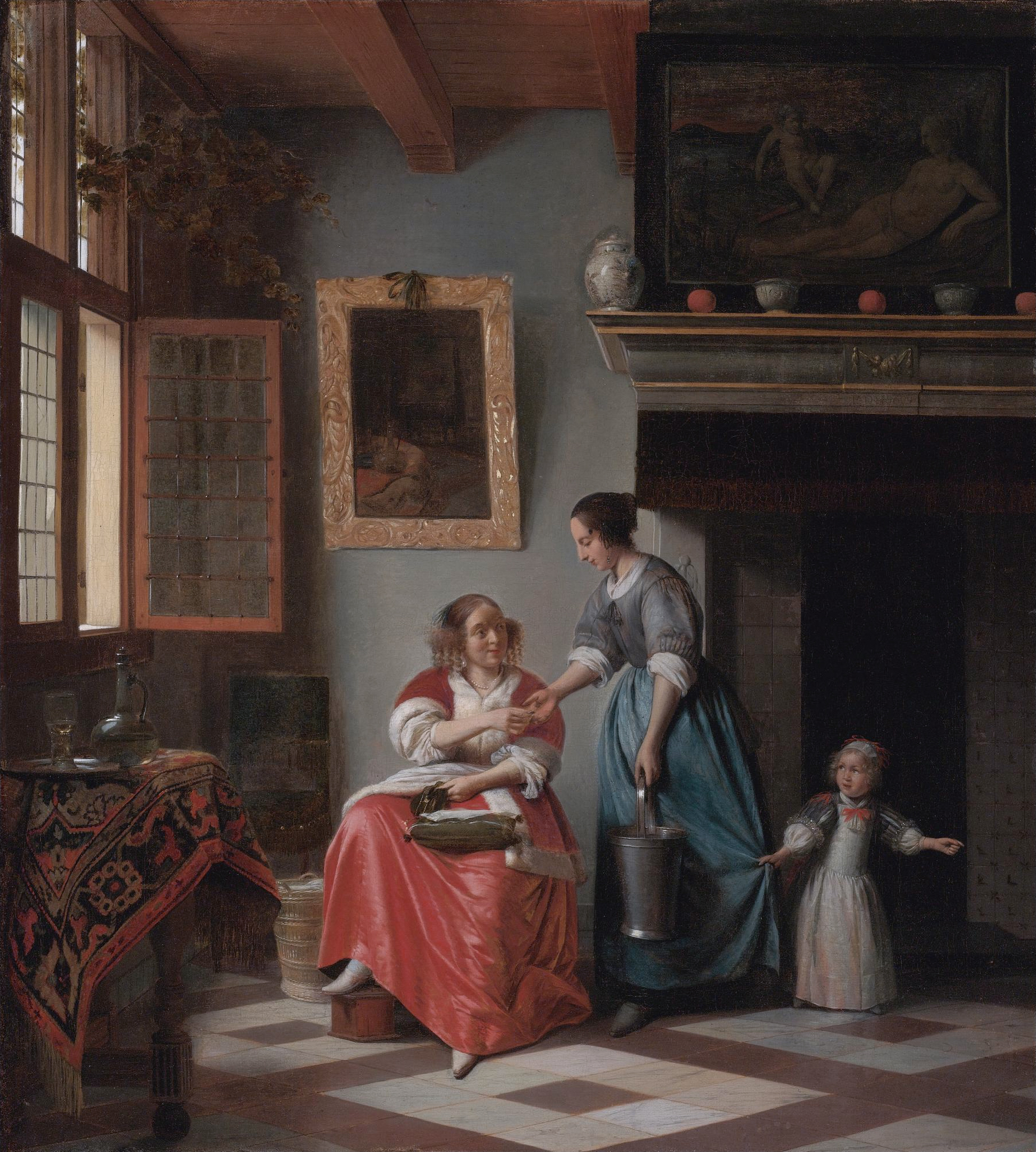
- Artist: Pieter de Hooch
- Year: c. 1668–1672
- Medium: oil on canvas
- Dimensions: 67.5 cm × 59 cm (26.6 in × 23 in)
- Location: Private collection

Woman Giving Money to a Servant-Girl (c. 1668–1672) is an oil-on-canvas painting by the Dutch painter Pieter de Hooch. It is an example of Dutch Golden Age painting and is now in a private collection.

This painting was documented by Hofstede de Groot in 1908, who wrote:

51. Woman giving Money to a Servant-Girl. In a well-furnished room sits a lady with an embroidery-pillow on her lap; she gives money from her purse to a servant-girl, who carries a market-pail. A little child pulls the girl by her apron. At the side by an open window is a table with a cloth, upon which are a water-bottle and a glass. It is a fine and carefully executed picture. Canvas, 27 1/2 inches by 24 1/2 inches.

Sales. Jan Danser Nijman, in Amsterdam, August 16, 1797, No. 114 (400 florins, Roos).

B. Ocke, in Leyden, April 21, 1817, No. 54 (370 florins, Van den Berg). [Compare the description of the picture in the Amsterdam sale of March 29, 1826; see 30.]

According to Peter C. Sutton, this work is not just similar, but is the same as no. 30 documented by Hofstede de Groot:

30. LADY WITH A SERVANT-GIRL. Sm. n. To the right in a room, paved with white and brown tiles, sits a lady. She wears a red jacket trimmed with fur and a skirt of the same colour; on her lap lies an embroidery-cushion. She is giving money from her pocket to a servant-girl who has a market-pail in her right hand. A child is pulling the girl to the left by her apron. By the open window to the right is a table with a cloth, upon which are placed a mug and a glass on a silver tray. On the wall above the fireplace hang a landscape with Venus and Cupid, and a mirror in which the picture is reflected. A vine-tendril creeps in at the window. It is a fine picture; the figures are very good, and the execution is broad and delicate. [See 51.] Canvas, 28 1/2 inches by 25 1/2 inches.

Sales:

- Jacob Crammer Simonszoon, in Amsterdam, November 25, 1778, No. 12 (520 florins, Nijman).
- (Probably) J. Danser Nijman, August 16, 1797 (400 florins, Roos).
- B. Ocke, in Leyden, April 21, 1817 (370 florins, Van den Berg).
- Roothan, in Amsterdam, March 29, 1826 (1185 florins, Brondgeest).
- In the collection of Sir Charles Bagot, London, in 1833 (Sm.).
- Sale. D. van der Schrieck, of Louvain, Brussels, April 8, 1861, No. 34 (6000 francs, Schollaert, son-in-law of Van der Schrieck).

Now in the collection of M. G. Helleputte, formerly Schollaert, in Louvain.

The same child can be seen in de Hooch's Interior with a Child Feeding a Parrot and in Teaching a Child to Walk:

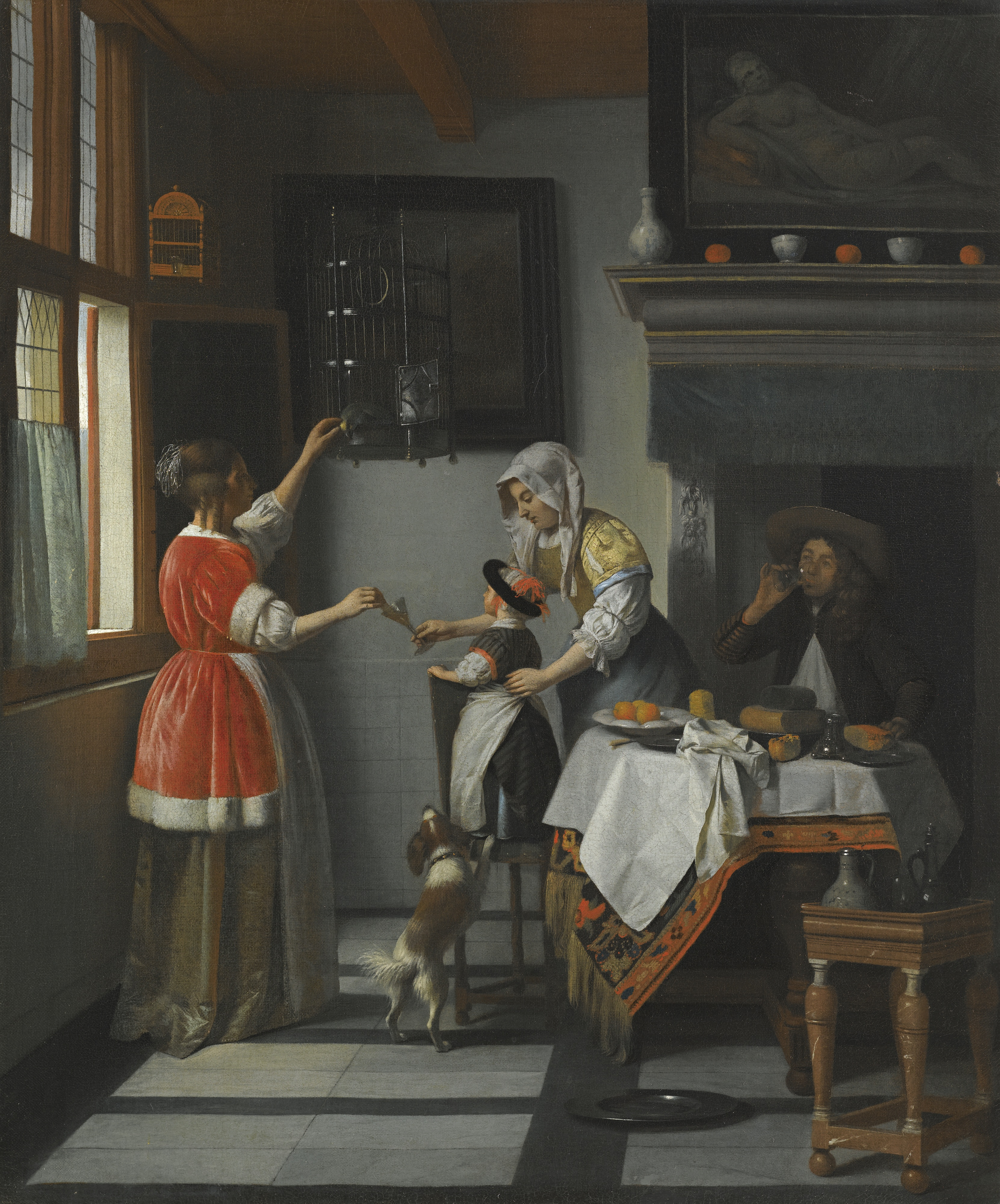
Interior with a Child Feeding a Parrot

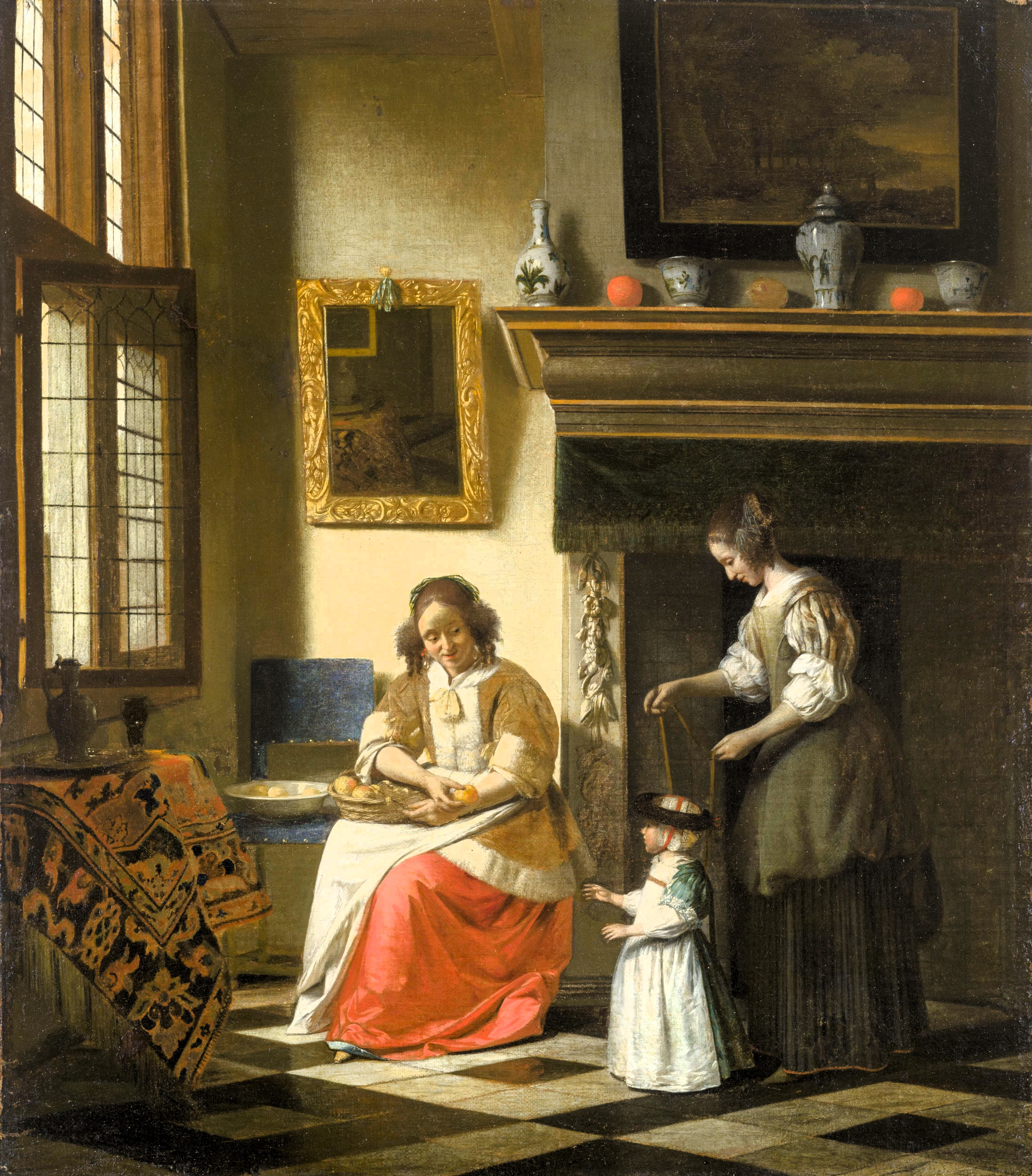
Teaching a Child to Walk

The subject of a woman giving a coin to a servant was copied by Michiel van Musscher:

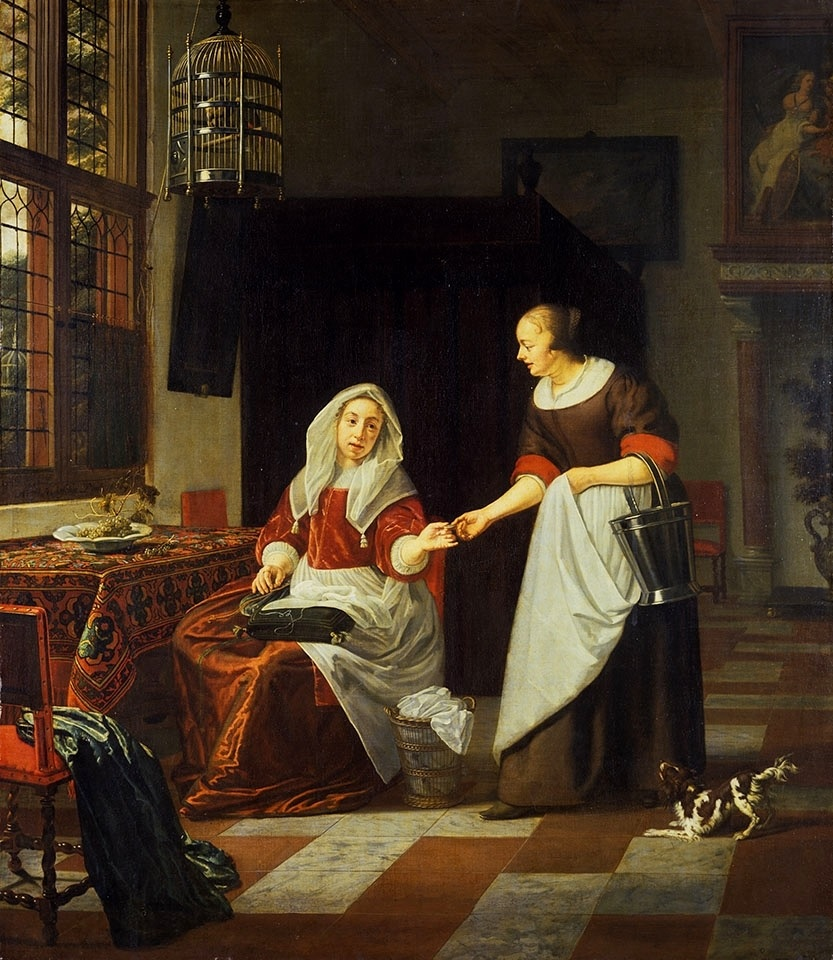
1669, Wawel Castle

In the 20th century the painting came into the hands of the New York dealer Knoedler and was purchased in 1927 by Mr. and Mrs. Allan C. Balch, and by their legacy it came into the collection of the Los Angeles County Museum in 1944 with the inventory number M.44.2.8, but the museum deacquisitioned it in 2009. It was sold for $1,650,500 on June 4, 2009, to benefit future acquisitions.

== See also ==
- List of paintings by Pieter de Hooch
