= Baby bumper headguard cap =

Protective hat worn by children learning to walk

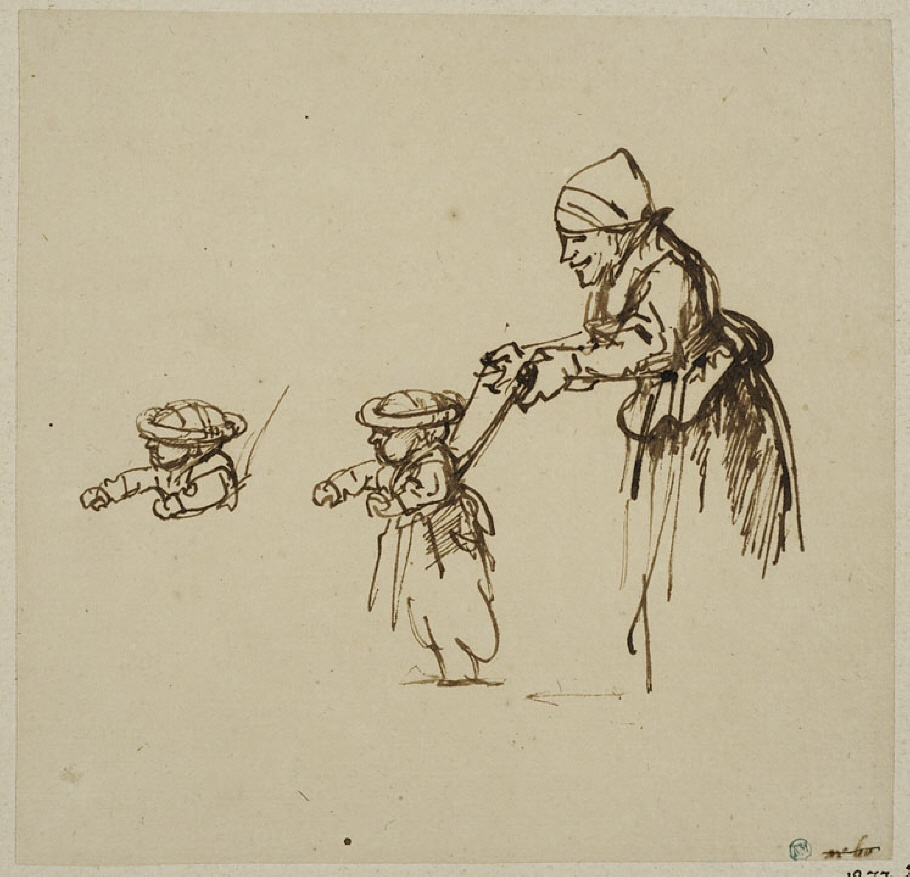
Drawing by Rembrandt of a woman teaching a child to walk with leading strings and a falling cap, or valhoed, 1646

A baby bumper headguard cap, also known as a falling cap, or pudding hat, is a protective hat worn by children learning to walk, to protect their heads in case of falls.

Known as a pudding or black pudding, a version used during the early 17th century until the late 18th century was usually open at the top and featured a sausage-shaped bumper roll that circled the head like a crown. It was fastened with straps under the chin.

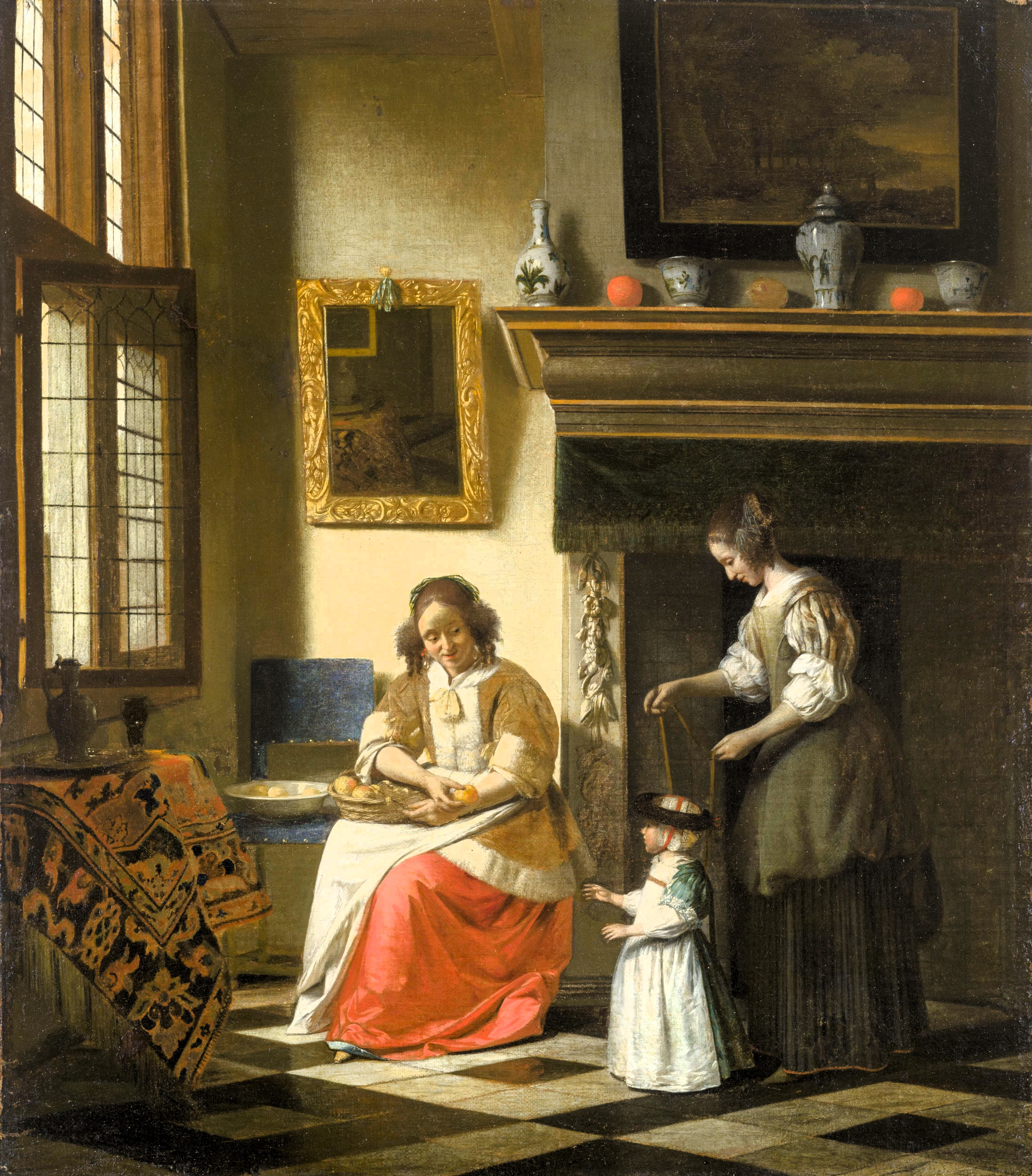
Teaching a Child to Walk, by Pieter de Hooch

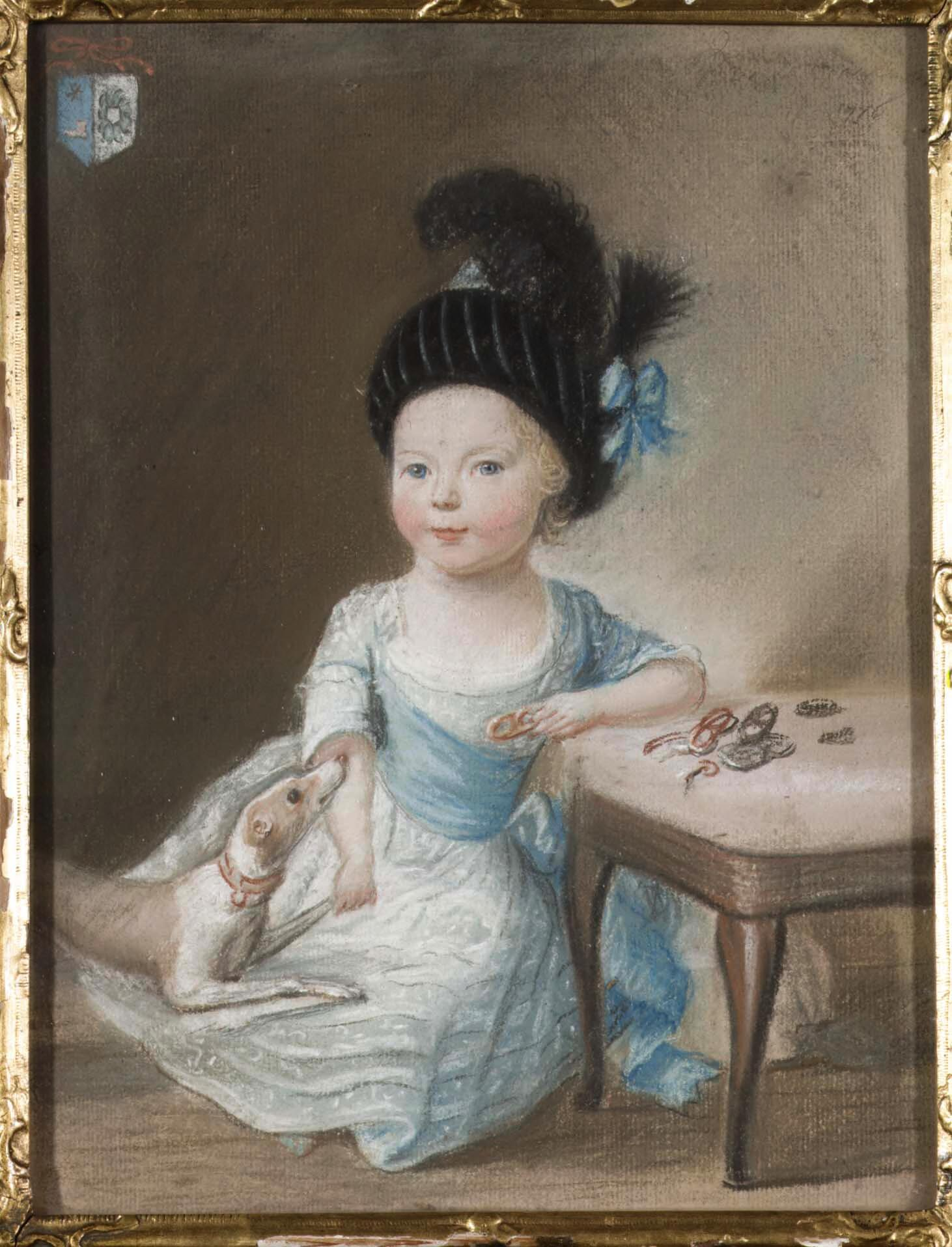
Portrait of Christian Hendrik Jacob Pielat van Bulderen in falling cap, by Pierre Frédéric de la Croix

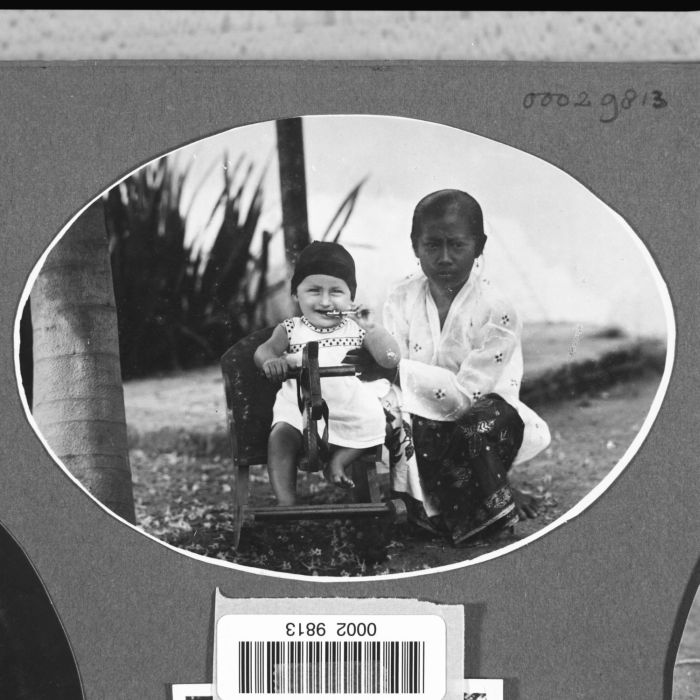
Child in a falling cap in Indonesia, 1920-1940

The modern-day version can be many colors and may cover the entire head like a helmet.
