= Walkodile =

Walkodile is a child safety device consisting of "a flexible plastic spine and safety belts" to keep groups of six young children together while on walks outside of their school or nursery/kindergarten.

Walkodile was released in the United Kingdom in 2007, and has won many awards in the fields of innovation, design and business. Its inventor Elaine Stephen was also awarded Member of the Most Excellent Order of the British Empire (MBE) in British Queen Elizabeth II's 2011 New Years Honours List for services to Child Safety.

== Background and product ==
Stephen, a Scottish primary school teacher, came up with the idea for the Walkodile in 2002. She wanted to find a way to keep her class of five year olds safer on walking trips outside the classroom, and in so doing, help give them more outdoor learning opportunities.

After several years of market research, design, prototyping and trials, Walkodile was released to the market in 2007. Stephen commissioned The Design Unit, at De Montfort University, Leicester to assist with the product's design.

Each child wears a high visibility safety belt which is connected to a flexible plastic spine by a security clip. The children hold on to the product's handles and walk with their supervisors(s), who hold the hand of a child at the front and/or back of the group. The product can be used for groups of six, four or two children, and is used by the 3-7 year age range.

== Business ==
Walkodile is marketed in the UK by Red Island Ltd, the company Stephen set up to develop the product and commercialise it. The resource is also sold by several UK catalogue distributors who carry it in their portfolio. Walkodile is also sold in several overseas territories and countries, including the United States by Excelligence Learning Corp, based in Monterey, California.

== Coverage ==
More than 200 articles have appeared about Walkodile in the UK media including Woman's Own magazine, Scottish Business Insider, The Scotsman and the Daily Mail. In addition, Stephen and her invention made an appearance on BBC TV's Working Lunch, BBC Radio Scotland's "Drivetime" and Scottish Television's "North Tonight".

== Awards ==
=== Walkodile ===
- British Invention of the Year 2007
- British Design of the Year 2007
- Shell European Safety Exchange 2005, First Prize

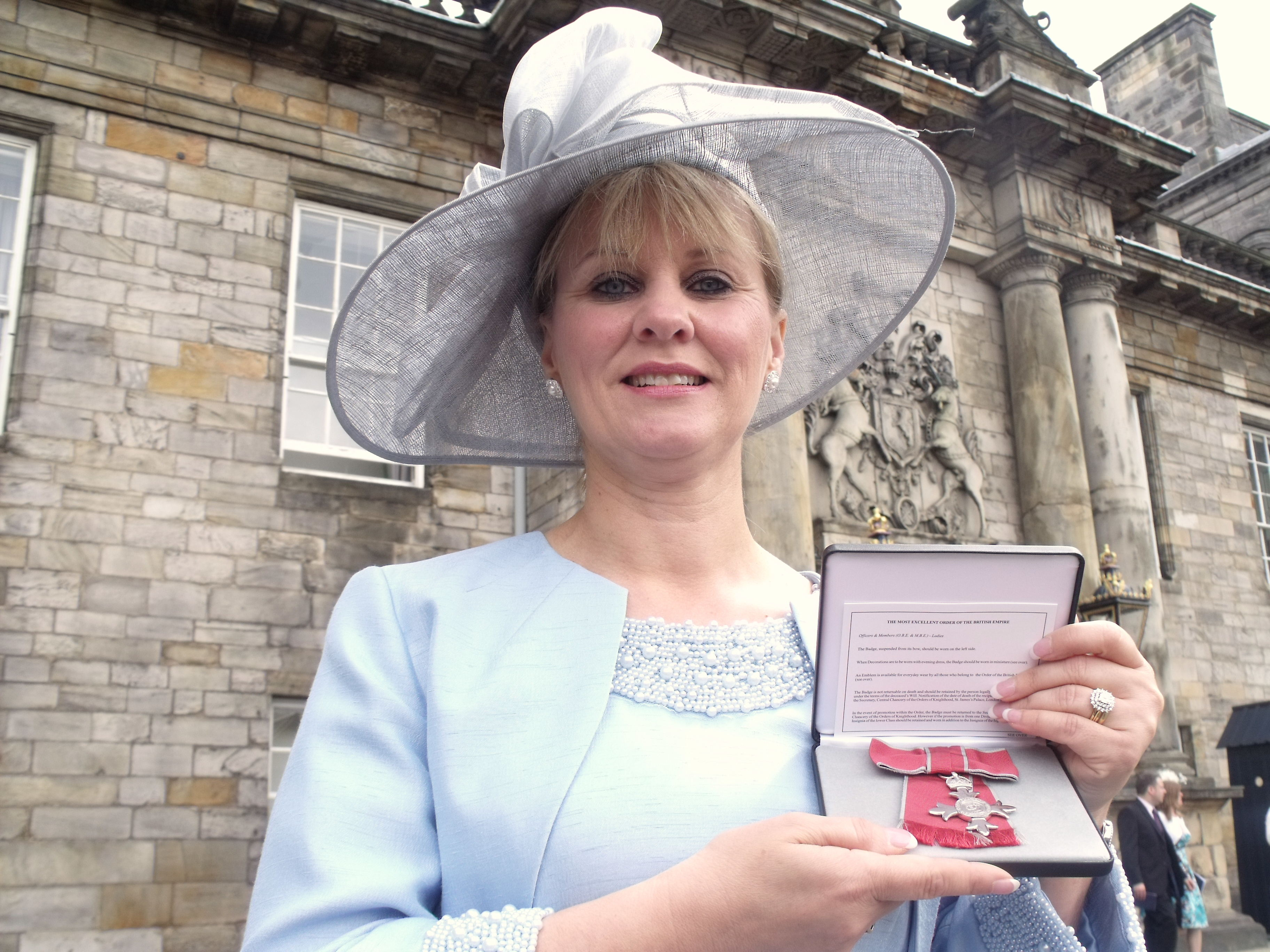
Walkodile inventor Elaine Stephen at Holyrood Palace, Edinburgh, receiving an MBE for Services to Child Safety in the Queen's New Years Honours List 2011

=== Elaine Stephen ===
- British Female Inventors & Innovators Network Awards - Product Development Diamond Winner, 2007
- British Female Inventors & Innovators Network Awards - Inventor/Innovation Diamond Winner, 2007
- European Woman Inventor/Innovator of the Year 2007 (Mother & Child category)
- Winner John Logie Baird Award for Entrepreneurial Spirit 2008
- Member of the Order of the British Empire (MBE) - Queen's New Years Honours List 2011 for services to Child Safety

=== Red Island Ltd ===
- UK Nursery Supplier/Innovator of the Year, Nursery Management Today Awards 2007
- Winner Grampian Business Awards (New Start Category) 2007
