= Leading strings =

Pieces of fabric to support a child learning to walk

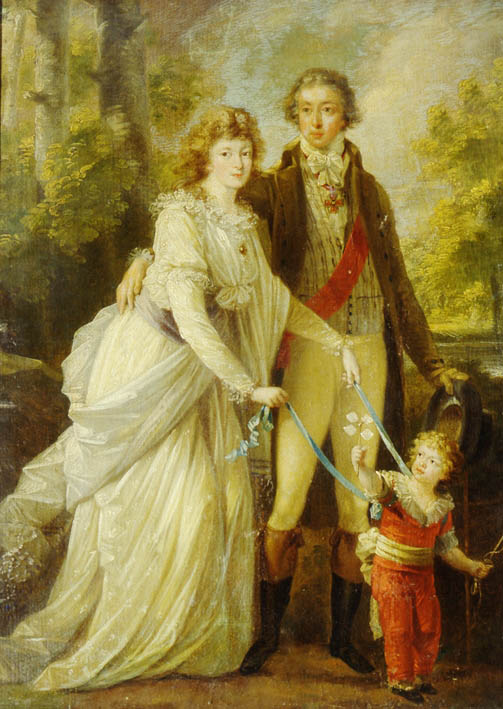
Child's costume with leading strings, 1790s

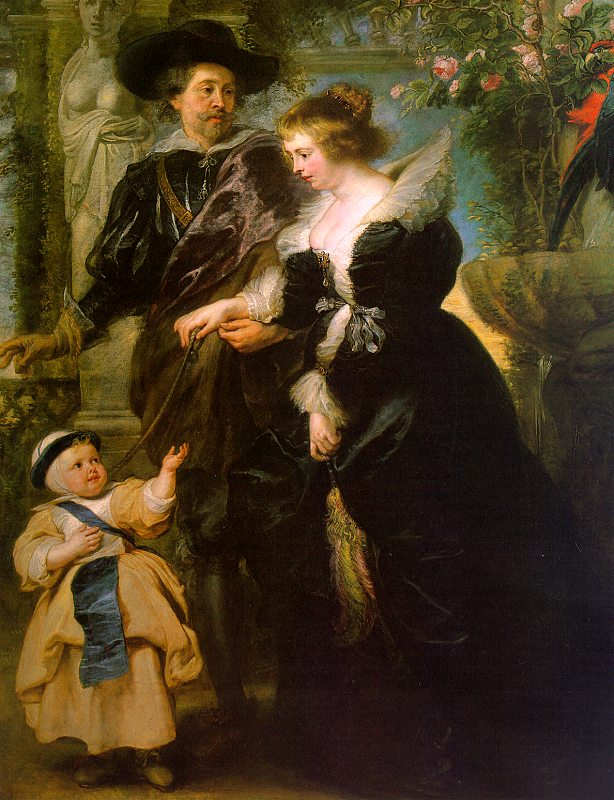
c. 1639

Leading strings are pieces of fabric to support a child learning to walk. In 17th and 18th century Europe, they were narrow fabric straps attached to children's clothing that prevented a child from straying too far or falling as they learned to walk.

Leading strings served two functions: reducing bumps and bruises in children who are beginning to walk, and restraining those who might injure themselves while exploring. Leading strings have been widely replaced by baby walkers and playpens, or similarly by a child harness.

== See also ==
- 1650–1700 in fashion
- 1700–1750 in fashion
- 1750–1795 in fashion
