= Spring Nymph at the Fountain =

Series of paintings by Lucas Cranach

- Quellnymphe am Brunnen (German)
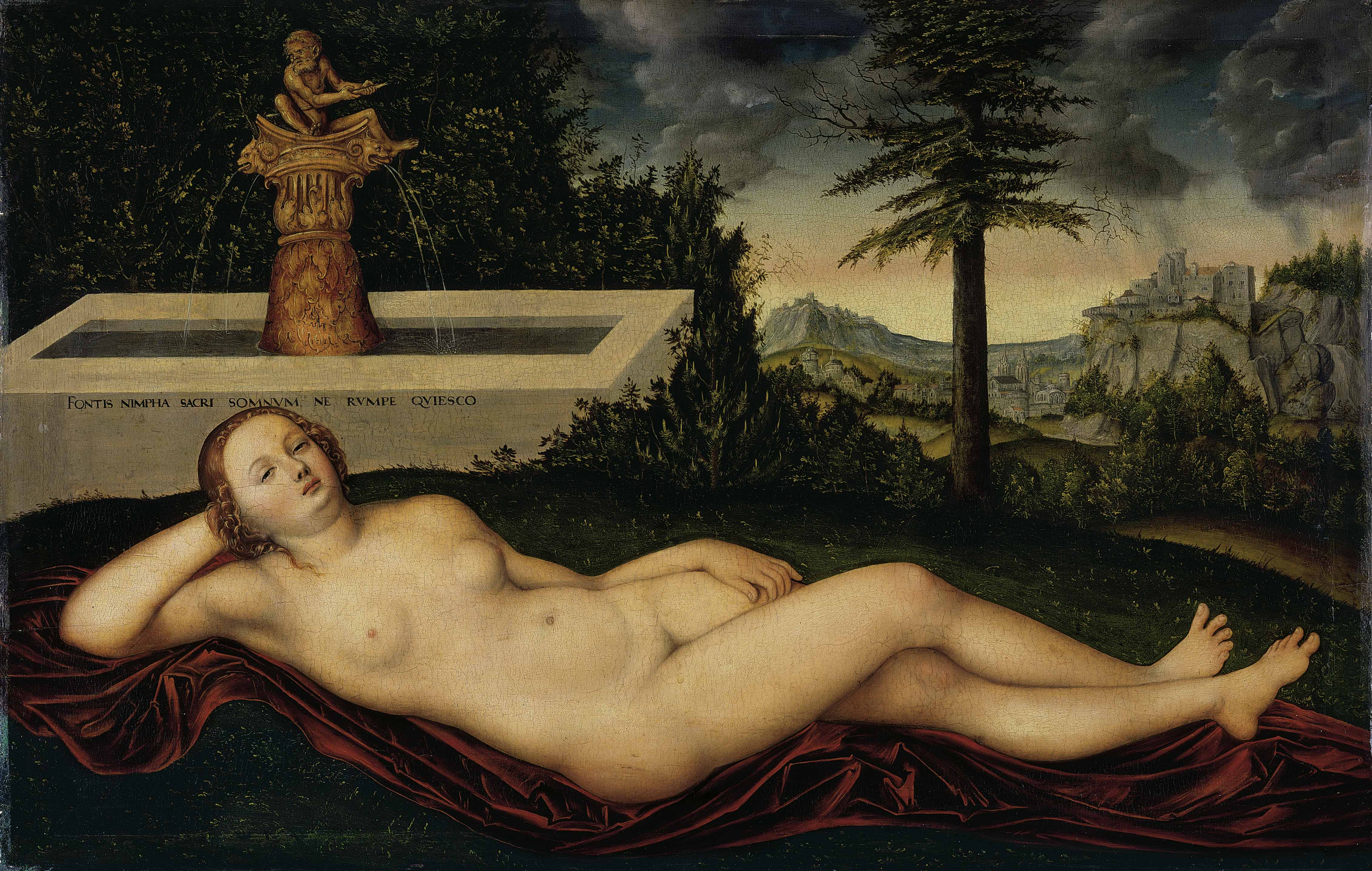
- Artist: Lucas Cranach the Elder
- Year: 1518
- Medium: Oil on panel
- Subject: Nymph, fountain
- Dimensions: 59 cm × 91.5 cm (23 in × 36.0 in)
- Location: Museum der bildenden Künste, Leipzig

The Spring Nymph at the Fountain (German: Quellnymphe am Brunnen) is the earliest example of a series of paintings by Renaissance artists Lucas Cranach the Elder and Lucas Cranach the Younger, depicting a resting spring nymph. There are at least 24 versions that were made in the Cranach workshop in Wittenberg. It is sometimes difficult to determine to what extent the master himself painted.

The first was painted in 1518 and is in the Museum der bildenden Künste in Leipzig, Germany. The version in the National Museum of Norway in Oslo from 1550 is attributed to the son Lucas Cranach the Younger, who worked in his father's workshop and later took it over.

== Description ==
In the foreground, a completely unclothed woman lies across the entire width of the picture, the hand of her bent right arm at the nape of her neck. The legs are crossed. All the details of the flawlessly depicted body are clearly visible. In the left half of the picture, directly behind the woman's upper body, there is the regular rectangle of a fountain. The woman lies on a crimson blanket, the drapery of which is worked out in detail. On the fountain is the following Latin inscription:

FONTIS NYMPHA SACRI SOMNVM / NE RVMPE QVIESCO.

I am the nymph of the holy spring, do not wake me, I rest.

The gaze from half-closed eyes is directed at the viewer. In the background is a landscape and a small section of sky with a threatening rain cloud.

== Interpretation ==
The painting is considered the first "reclining female nude in landscape" north of the Alps. It has been compared to Giorgione's Sleeping Venus, whose motif bears a close resemblance to the Resting Spring Nymph. Another source refers to a woodcut illustration in the allegorical novel Hypnerotomachia Poliphili, published in Venice in 1499, which could have served as a model.

The painting is attributed to the genre of mythological painting, in which classical themes and figures are taken up. In the present case, it is the figure of the Nymph of Castalia. The Castalian Spring is a fountain where ancient poets and philosophers came to drink to find inspiration. The landscape in the background also corresponds to the style of mythological paintings.

However, the painting's inherent attitude to reality and nature and the restrained sensuality of the sleeping female nude go beyond the attitude of classical antiquity. The Cranach workshop has produced numerous revealing depictions of women, such as Cupid Complaining to Venus, Judgment of Paris, The Three Graces – all with mythological undertones to cover up the erotic.

In the version La ninfa de la fuente (ca. 1530–34), which can be seen in the Museo Thyssen-Bornemisza in Madrid, the spring nymph wears nothing but jewellery and a transparent veil that conceals nothing and, on the contrary, draws attention to nudity. A bow and quiver hang from a tree, indicating that she belongs to the entourage of Diana, the goddess of the hunt. Another interpretation is that the bow belongs to Cupid, the companion of Venus. Below the tree are two partridges, which are usually considered to be birds of Venus. In the background there is a waterspring, and in the upper left corner a Cartellino with the same Latin text as in the picture of 1518.

According to Greek mythology, nymphs lived as goddesses of the great outdoors on mountains and trees, in the sea, in grottos and in springs, and any mortal who came too close to them was in danger. The gloomy clouds in the evening sky in the painting from 1518 also allow the viewer who is not familiar with Latin to feel something of the eerie, dramatic warning of the fountain inscription. All images in the series contain such an "interplay between seduction and warning".

== Versions ==
Image	Title	Year	Material	Size (cm)	Collection
	Liegende Quellnymphe	1518	Oil on wood	59 × 92	Museum der bildenden Künste, Leipzig
	Quellnymphe	c. 1515–1520	Oil on wood	58,1 × 86,7	Jagdschloss Grunewald, Berlin
	Quellnymphe (schlummernde Diana)	c. 1525	Oil on wood	15 × 15	Veste Coburg, Bayern|
	La ninfa de la fuente	c. 1530–1534	Oil on wood	75 × 120	Museo Thyssen-Bornemisza, Madrid
	The Nymph of the Fountain	1534	Oil on wood	64 × 90	Walker Art Gallery, Liverpool
	La Nymphe à la source	c. 1537	Oil on wood	48,5 × 74,2	Musée des Beaux-Arts et d’Archéologie, Besançon
	The Nymph of the Spring	after 1537	Oil on wood	48,4 × 72,8	National Gallery of Art, Washington
	Quellnymphe	after 1537	Oil on wood	34,3 × 56	Kunsthalle Bremen
	The Nymph of the Spring attributed to Lucas Cranach the Younger	c. 1540	Oil on wood	58 × 79	San Diego Museum of Art (since 2018)
	The Nymph of the Spring	c. 1540–1545	Oil on wood	82.1 × 120.5	Private collection
	Hvilende kildenymfe attributed to Lucas Cranach the Younger	1550	Oil on wood	71.5 × 122	National Museum, Oslo

== Other ==
In 1972, the Deutsche Post of the GDR issued a postage stamp with the painting in the 1518 version.

== Bibliography ==
- Kluttig-Altmann, Ralf (2017). "Erhitzte Damen. Das Frauenbild auf Wittenberger Renaissancekacheln im Kontext von Cranachwerkstatt und Reformation" [Heated Ladies. The image of women on Wittenberg Renaissance tiles in the context of Cranachwerkstatt and the Reformation.] (PDF). Historische Archäologie. Sonderband 2017. Festschrift für Andreas Heege (in German).
- Beckett, Wendy (1995). Bonniers stora bok om måleriets historia [Bonniers great book on the history of painting] (in Swedish). Stockholm: Bonnier Alba i samarbete med (in cooperation with) the National Gallery of Art, Washington, D.C. ISBN 91-34-51656-5.
- Helmut Börsch-Supan (1974). "Cranachs Quellnymphen und sein Gestaltungsprinzip der Variation" (pdf). archiv.ub.uni-heidelberg.de (in German).
- Guido Messling, Norbert Michels. "Cranachs Darstellung des Aktes. Einflüsse und Stellenwert". wege-zu-cranach.de (in German).
- Tom Schwan (2015-08-25). "Die Nymphe der Reformation". prisma.de (in German).
