= Museum der bildenden Künste =

Museum der bildenden Künste Leipzig
- Museum der bildenden Künste Leipzig
- Established: 1848
- Location: Leipzig, Germany
- Coordinates: 51°20′32″N 12°22′32″E
- Type: Art museum
- Director: Stefan Weppelmann
- Website: www.mdbk.de

The Museum der bildenden Künste (German: "Museum of Fine Arts") is a museum in Leipzig, Saxony, Germany. It covers artworks from the Late Middle Ages to Modernity.

== History ==
=== Museum Foundation and First Museum ===
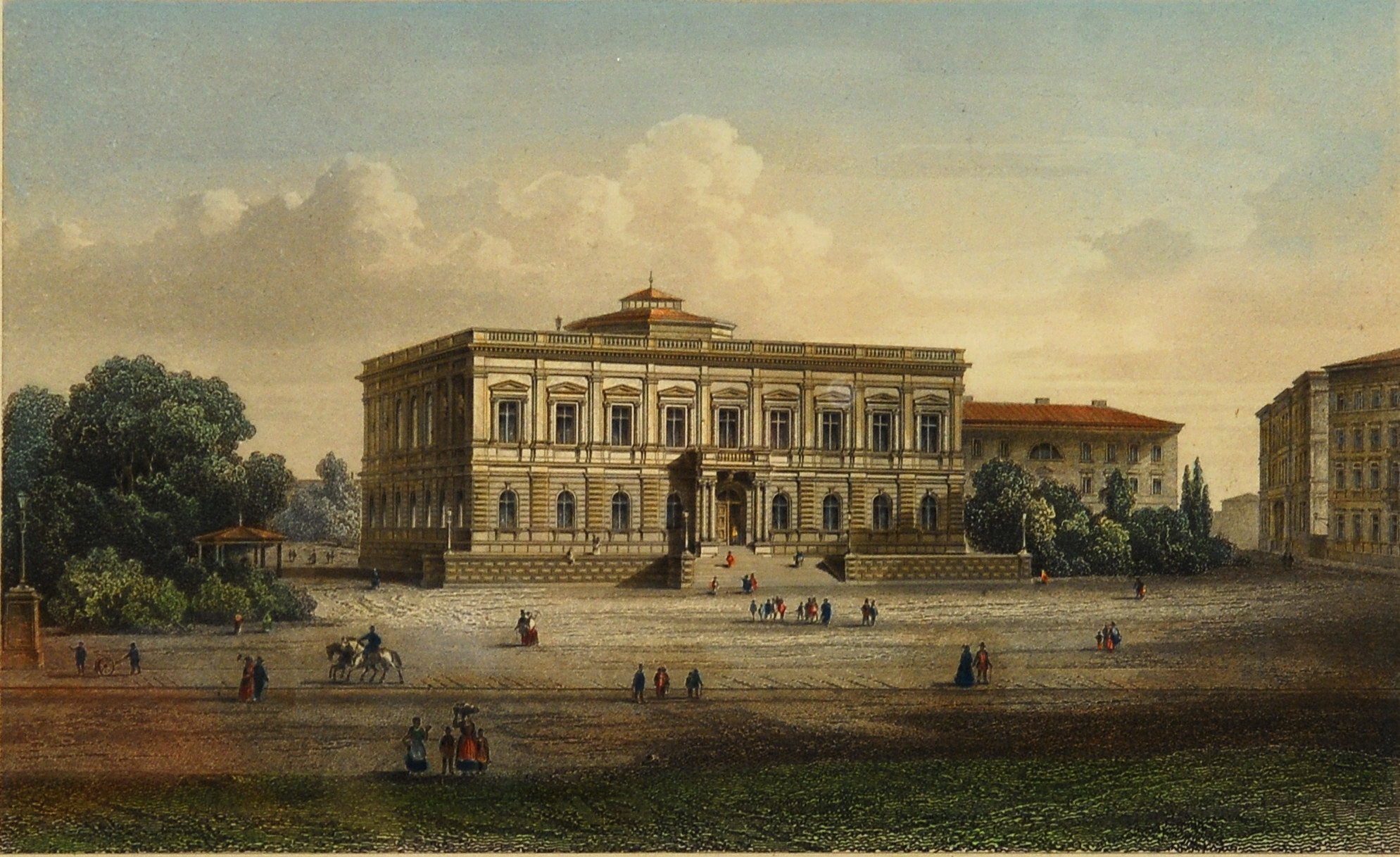
The museum in 1858

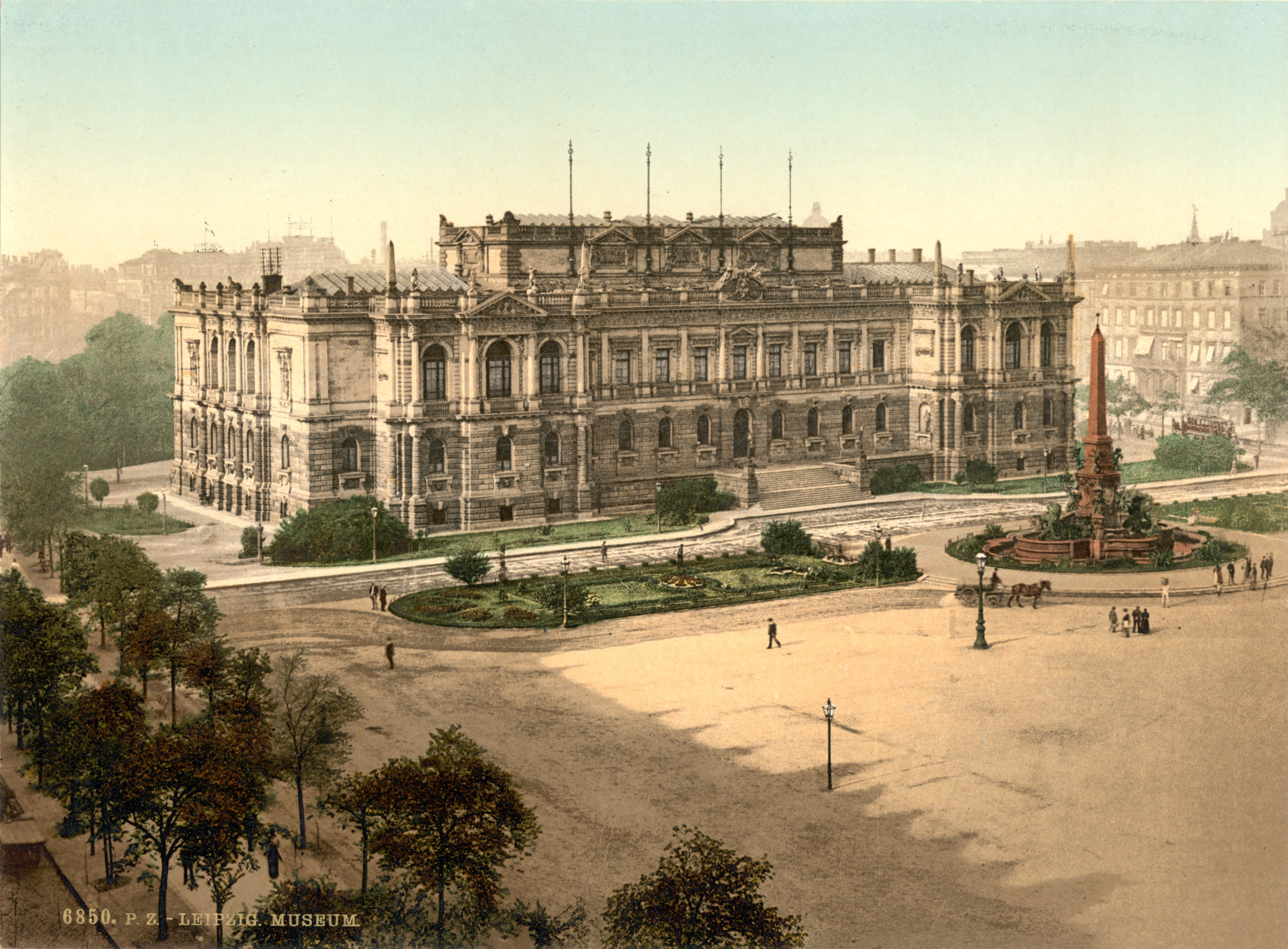
The museum at the Augustusplatz around 1890–1900

The museum dates back to the founding of the "Leipzig Art Association" by Leipzig art collectors and promoters in 1837, and had set itself the goal of creating an art museum. On 10 December 1848, the association was able to open the "Städtische Museum" in the first public school on the Moritzbastei. There were issued approximately hundred gathered and donated works of (at that time) contemporary art.

Through major donations including Maximilian Speck von Sternburg, Alfred Thieme and Adolf Heinrich Schletter the collection grew with time. In 1853, businessman and art collector Adolf Fer donated his collection under the condition that the city build a municipal museum within five years. Shortly before the deadline expired the museum was inaugurated on 18 December 1858. It was located on the Augustusplatz and was designed by Ludwig Lange in the style of the Italian Renaissance. Today, the Gewandhaus is located at its location. From 1880 to 1886 the building had been for the ever-growing collection extended by Hugo Licht. At the beginning of the 20th century, Fritz von Harck donated a part of his collection to the museum.

In 1937 the Nazis confiscated 394 paintings and prints mainly of Expressionism in the propaganda campaign Degenerate art. In the night of 4 December 1943, the building was destroyed by a British air raid. Much of the inventory had previously been brought to safety.

=== Dimitroff Museum and interim solutions ===
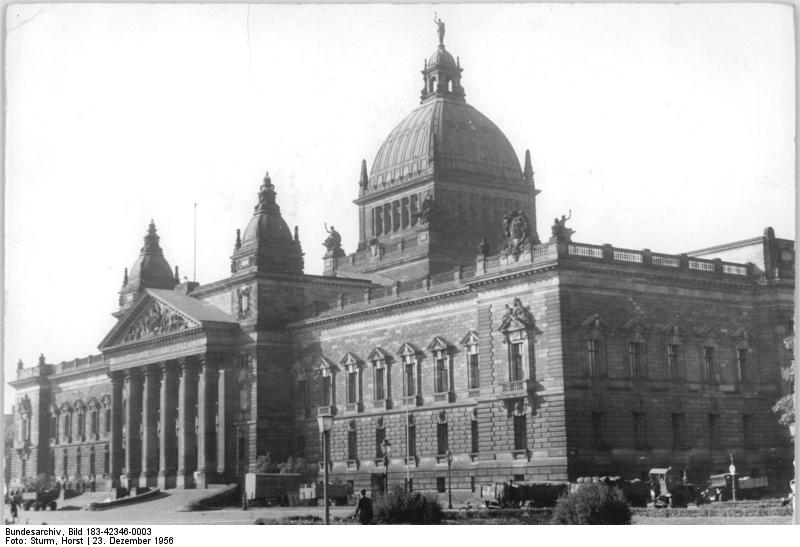
Dimitrov-Museum 1956 (today Federal Administrative Court)

After the destruction of the building on Augustusplatz, the museum began a 61-year odyssey through several interim arrangements. After it was taken in 1948 in areas of the former Reichsbank in Petersstrasse, it moved in 1952 into the former Reich Court building.

After the decision on the relocation of the Federal Administrative Court in Leipzig in May 1992, the museum had to move again in August 1997 into an interim site in Handelshof. The collection was shown in limited form at the interim sites.

=== New building ===
In the mid-1990s, the city decided to give the museum back its own building. On 4 December 2004, exactly 61 years after the destruction of the "Städtischen Museum" on Augustusplatz, the new museum opened at the former Sachsenplatz (Saxony Square). The rectangular museum building cost 74.5 million euros. Architects Hufnagel Pütz Rafaelian won the 1997 Europe-wide competition for the new museum. They designed a compact building mass framed by angled structures in the corners of the pre-war street block. It took 15 years until these 4 structures has been built. Today, the 34 meters high museum rises inside a court with outlets at every of the 4 sides and towers above those structures along the streets.

The Museum of Fine Arts was included in the Blue Book, published in 2001, which includes a list of nationally important cultural institutions in eastern Germany and comprises currently 20 so-called cultural lighthouses. As such, it is a member of the Konferenz Nationaler Kultureinrichtungen. The Blue Book aims to highlight the importance of East German cultural heritage for the cultural heritage of Germany and Europe.

== Collection ==
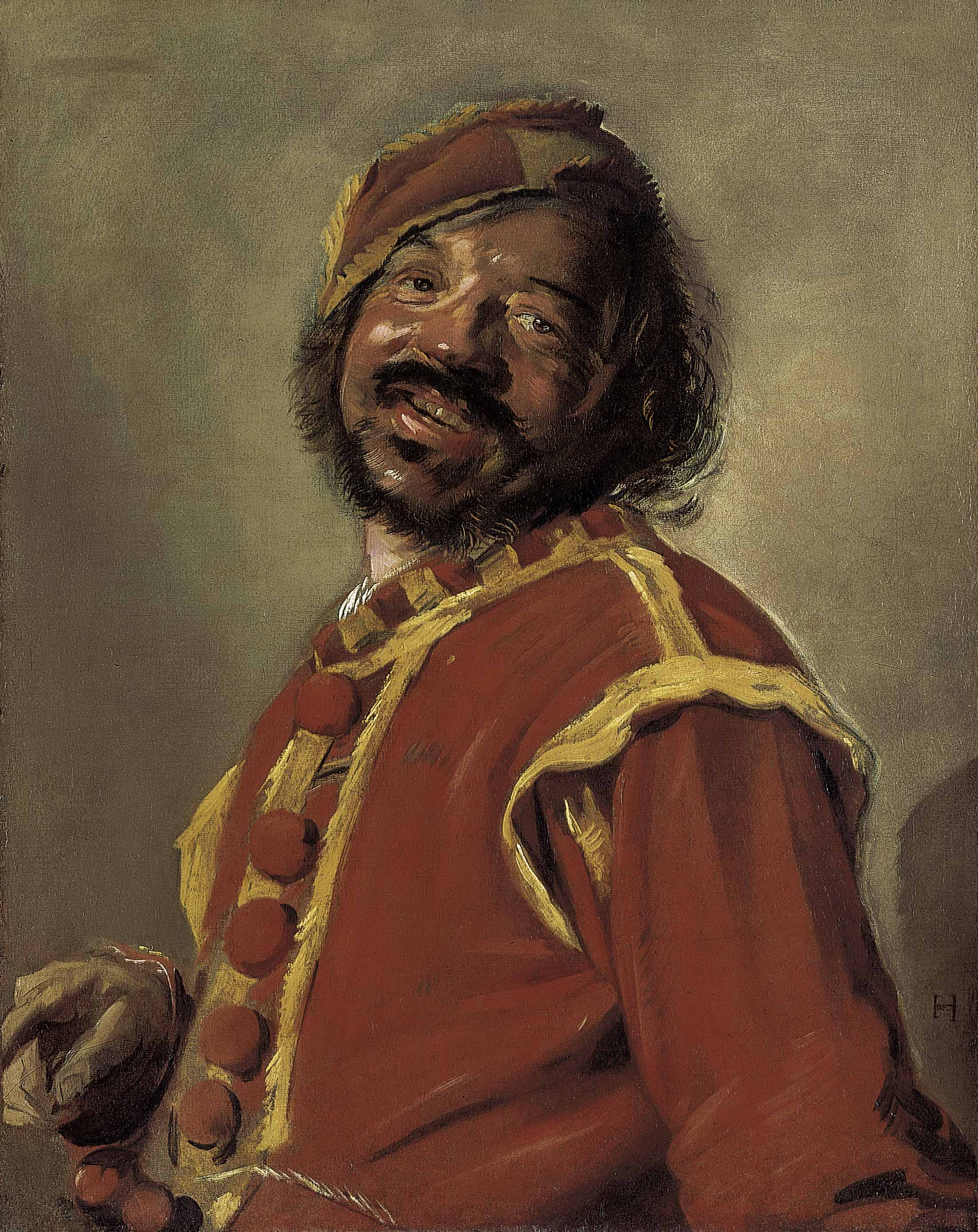
Frans Hals, The Mulatto, 1627

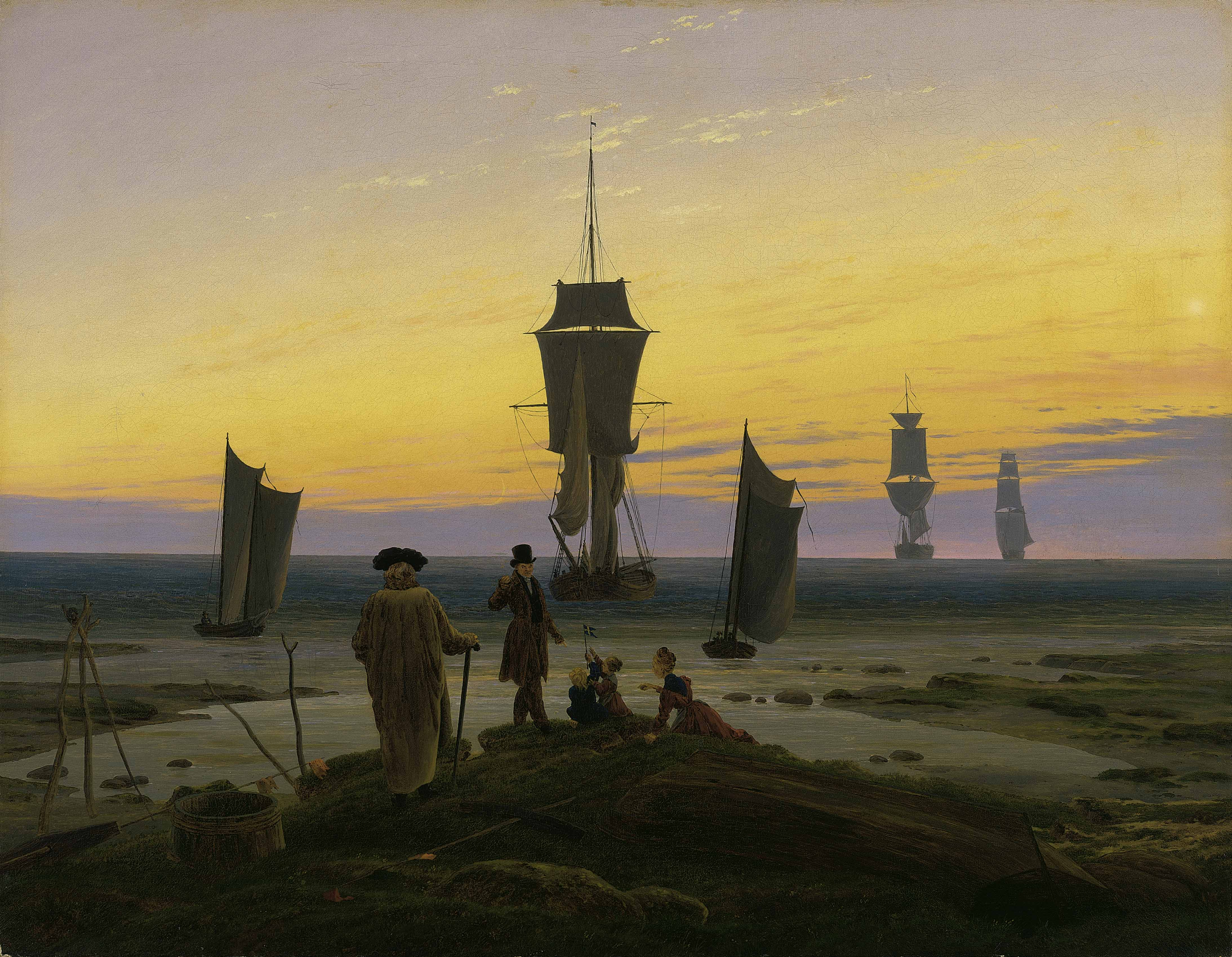
Caspar David Friedrich, The Stages of Life, 1835

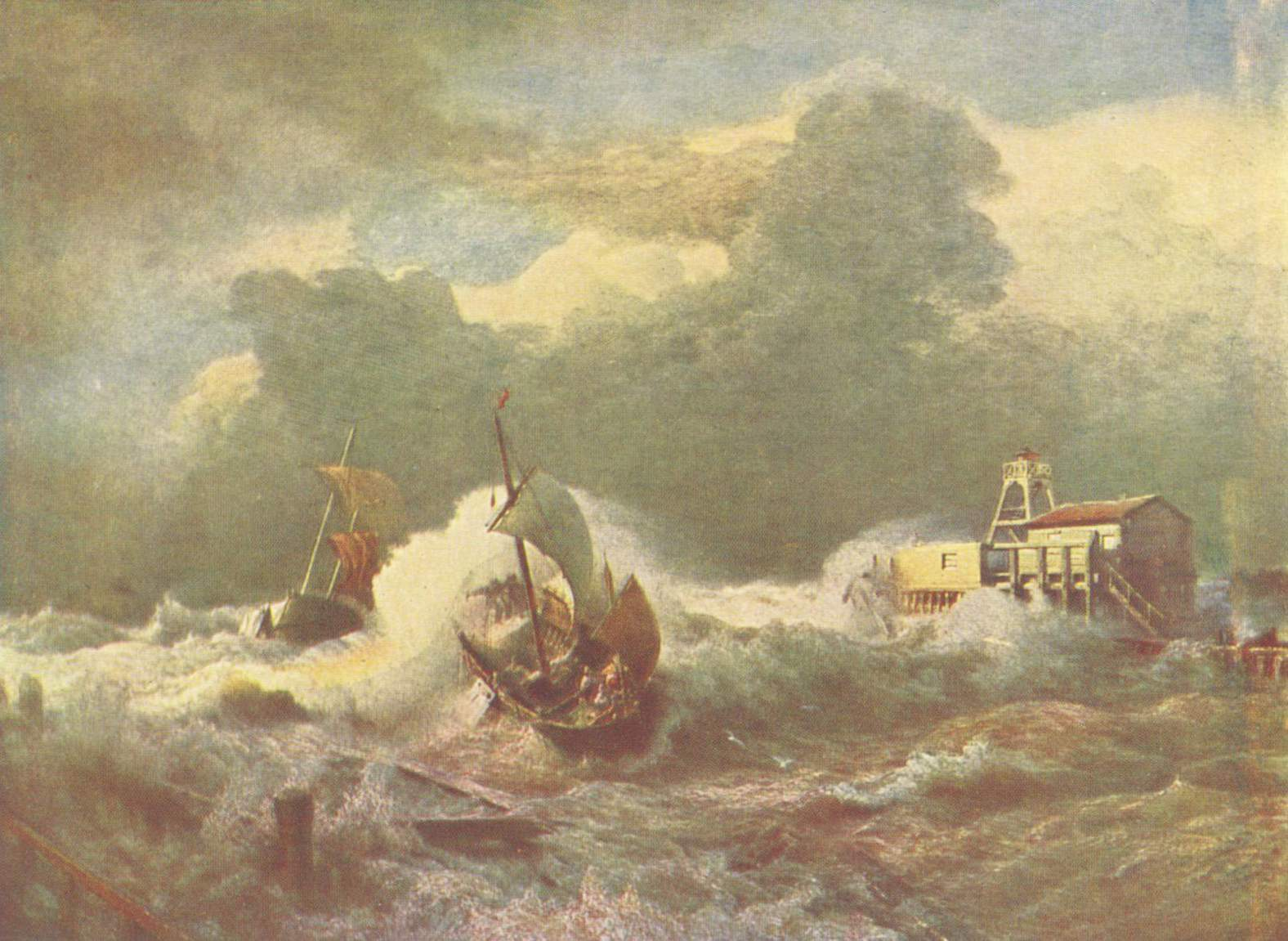
Andreas Achenbach, Lighthouse by Ostende, 1887

Today's collection includes approximately 3,500 paintings, 1,000 sculptures and 60,000 graphic sheets. It includes works from the Late Middle Ages to the present, focusing on Old German and Early Netherlandish art of the 15th and 16th century, Italian art from the 15th to 18th century, Dutch art of the 17th century, French art of the 19th and German art from the 18th to 20th century.

Important parts of the collection are works by Dutch and German Old Masters like Frans Hals and Lucas Cranach the Elder, Romantics like Caspar David Friedrich, and representatives of the Düsseldorf school of painting such as Andreas Achenbach. The highlight of the sculpture collection presents the Beethoven sculpture by Max Klinger. A separate floor is devoted to the comprehensive work of Max Klinger and Max Beckmann.

In the field of Modern Art, the museum is primarily to closed factory look of the Leipzig School by artists such as Werner Tübke, Bernhard Heisig, and Wolfgang Mattheuer or larger stocks of the international currently very popular artists Neo Rauch and Daniel Richter.

However, large vacancies in this division of this international field are present. These resulted historically from the GDR period and due to the tight financial situation of the city (the purchase of the museum's budget for 2005 amounted to only 75,000 euros) and can not easily made up. The museum tries to address this problem by experimenting with unusual combinations of works from different eras, which aims to provide visitors with new perspectives.

In the future the museum will be dependent on the expansion of its inventory from donations and permanent loans. The 19th-century tradition began with generous foundations, which itself led only to the founding of the museum, and therefore sits down even in the 21st century. On the occasion of the opening of the new museum building, in 2004 the art collector couple Dr. Hans-Peter Bühler and Marion Buehler-Brockhaus donated 41 works by French artists, including Jean-Baptiste Corot, Charles-François Daubigny, Jean-François Millet, Eugène Delacroix, Edgar Degas and Claude Monet. This shows the development of the art of the 19th century by the Barbizon School to Impressionism. Recently, the museum received from the BMW Group, which is culturally engaged since the new Leipzig plant in the city, the photo collection "AutoWerke" (Car Works). For the greatest benefactors a mosaic is dedicated as a token of gift and is on display in the foyer.

== Restitution of Nazi-looted art ==
Some of the artworks in the collection had belonged to Jewish collectors who were persecuted by the Nazis. The museum has restituted works from the Heine collection, including paintings by Corot, Courbet, Renoir, and Rembrandt etchings, that were seized after Kristallnacht in 1938 and acquired by the museum in 1942. Some works have been restituted to the heirs of Henri Hinrichsen, who was murdered at Auschwitz in 1942. 105 works by Max Klinger were returned to the family of Gustav Kirstein in 2000. Six works stolen by the Gestapo from Carl Sonntag in 1939 and auctioned in 1941, were returned to his family in 1994. A restitution is underway for a sculpture by Max Klinger, which was seized from Richard Moritz Meyer's family in 1936.

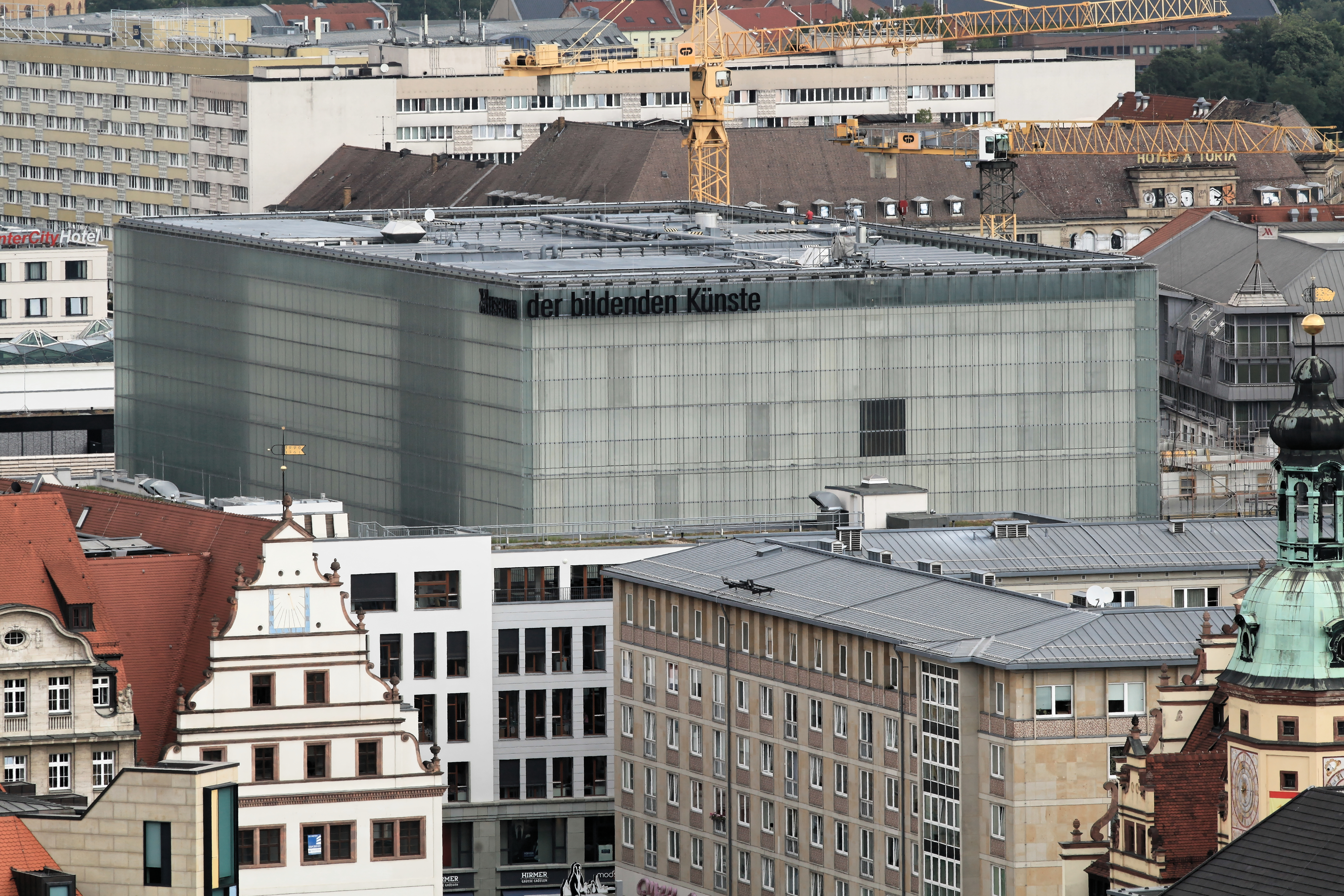
The outside of the new building completed in 2004.

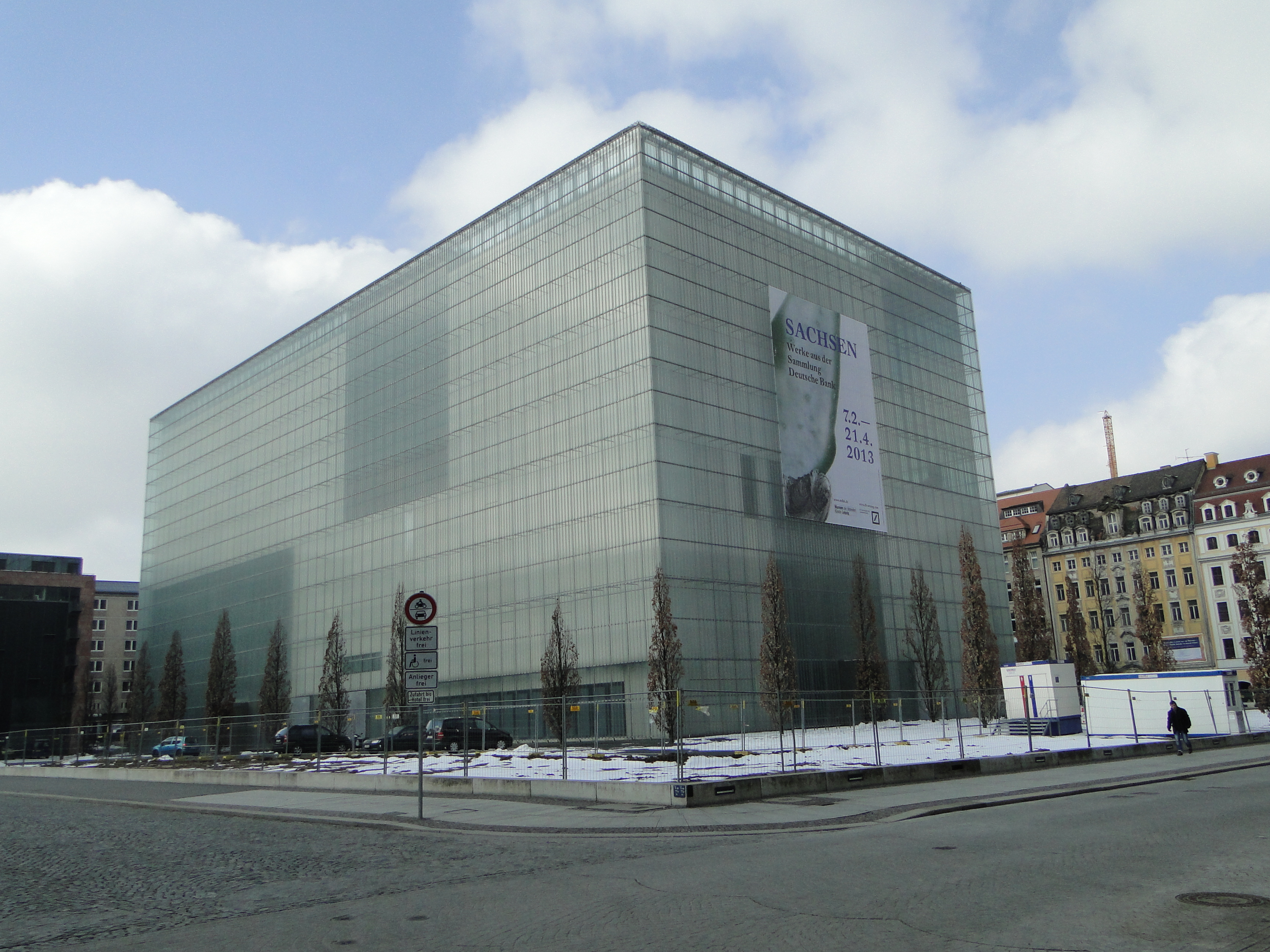
A second image of the new building.

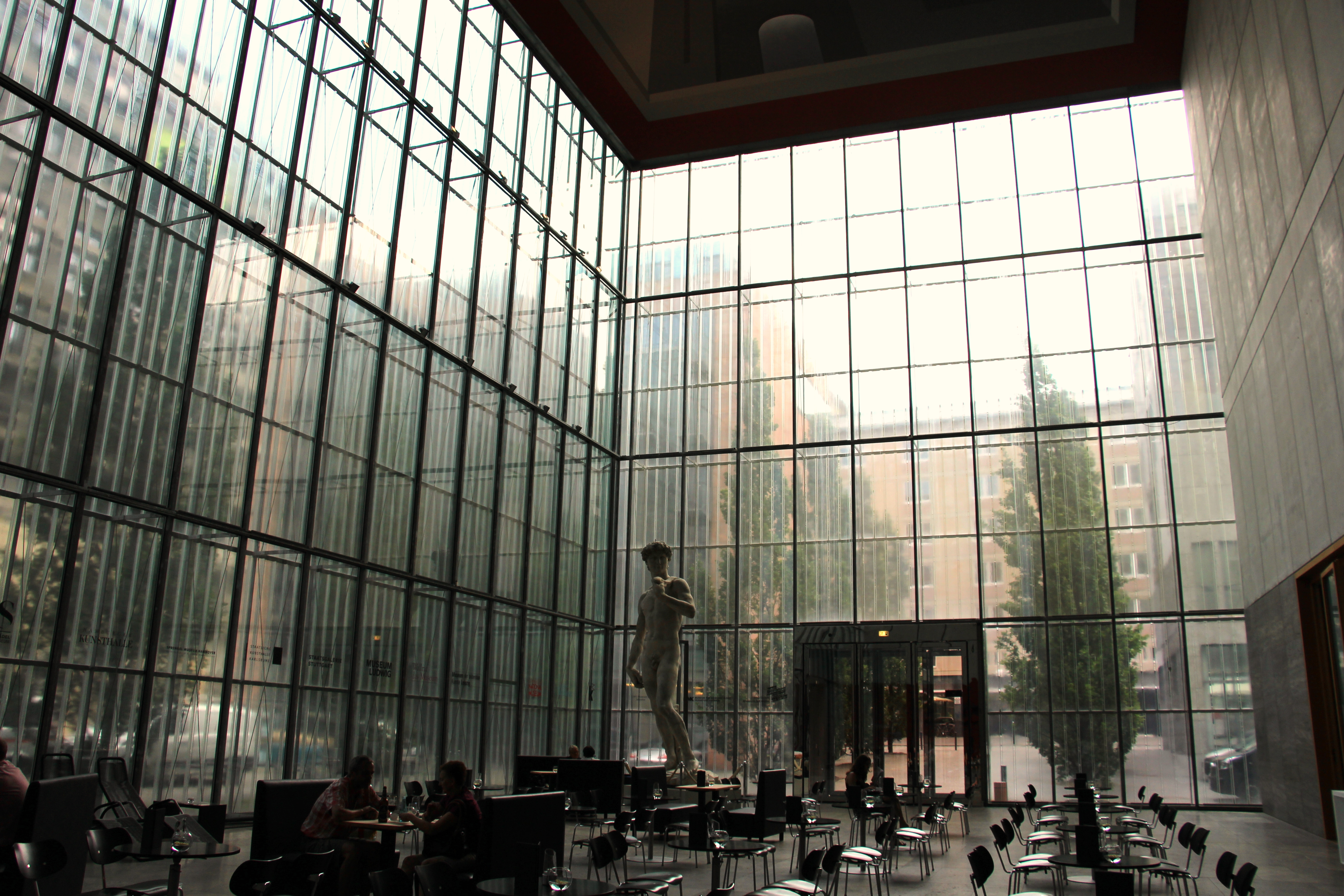
The café.

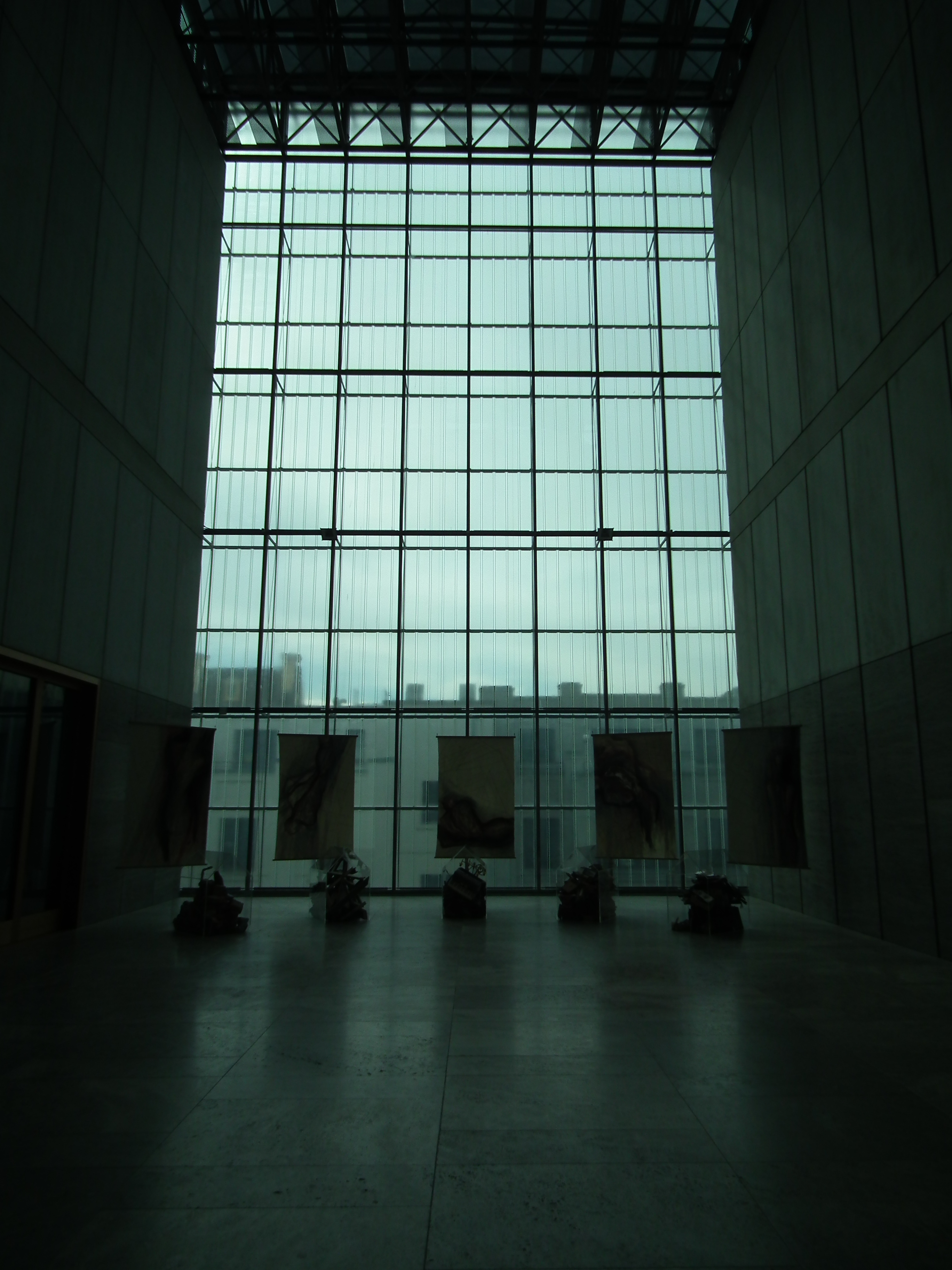
The interior of the building.

== See also ==
- Spring nymph at the fountain, painting by Lucas Cranach the Elder, 1518 version
- Adam and Eve, painting by Lucas Cranach the Elder, 1533 version
- The Seven Ages of Woman, painting by Hans Baldung, 1544
- Musical Party in a Hall and Teaching a Child to Walk, paintings by Pieter de Hooch
- Ganymede and the Eagle, sculpture by Bertel Thorvaldsen, around 1817
- Isle of the Dead, painting by Arnold Böcklin, 1886 version
- List of art museums
- List of museums in Germany
- Architecture of Leipzig

== Literature ==
- Leipziger Volkszeitung Journal, Sonderbeilage zur Eröffnung des neuen Bildermuseums vom 3. Dezember 2004.
- Bode, Peter M. (2004). "Das Haus der tausend Räume". art - Das Kunstmagazin (in German). No. 12. p. 19-31.
- Ballhausen, Nils (2004). "Undurchsichtig. Das Museum der bildenden Künste in Leipzig" (PDF). Bauwelt (in German). No. 46. p. 12-20.
- Museum der Bildenden Künste (2003). Corot bis Monet : von Barbizon zum Impressionismus : Schenkung Bühler-Brockhaus an das Museum der Bildenden Künste Leipzig : zur Eröffnung des Museumsneubaus im Jahr 2004 (in German). Leipzig: Museum der Bildenden Künste. ISBN 3-00-011003-8. OCLC 61263293.
