= Ganymede and the Eagle =

Sculpture by Bertel Thorvaldsen

- Ganymede with Jupiter's Eagle
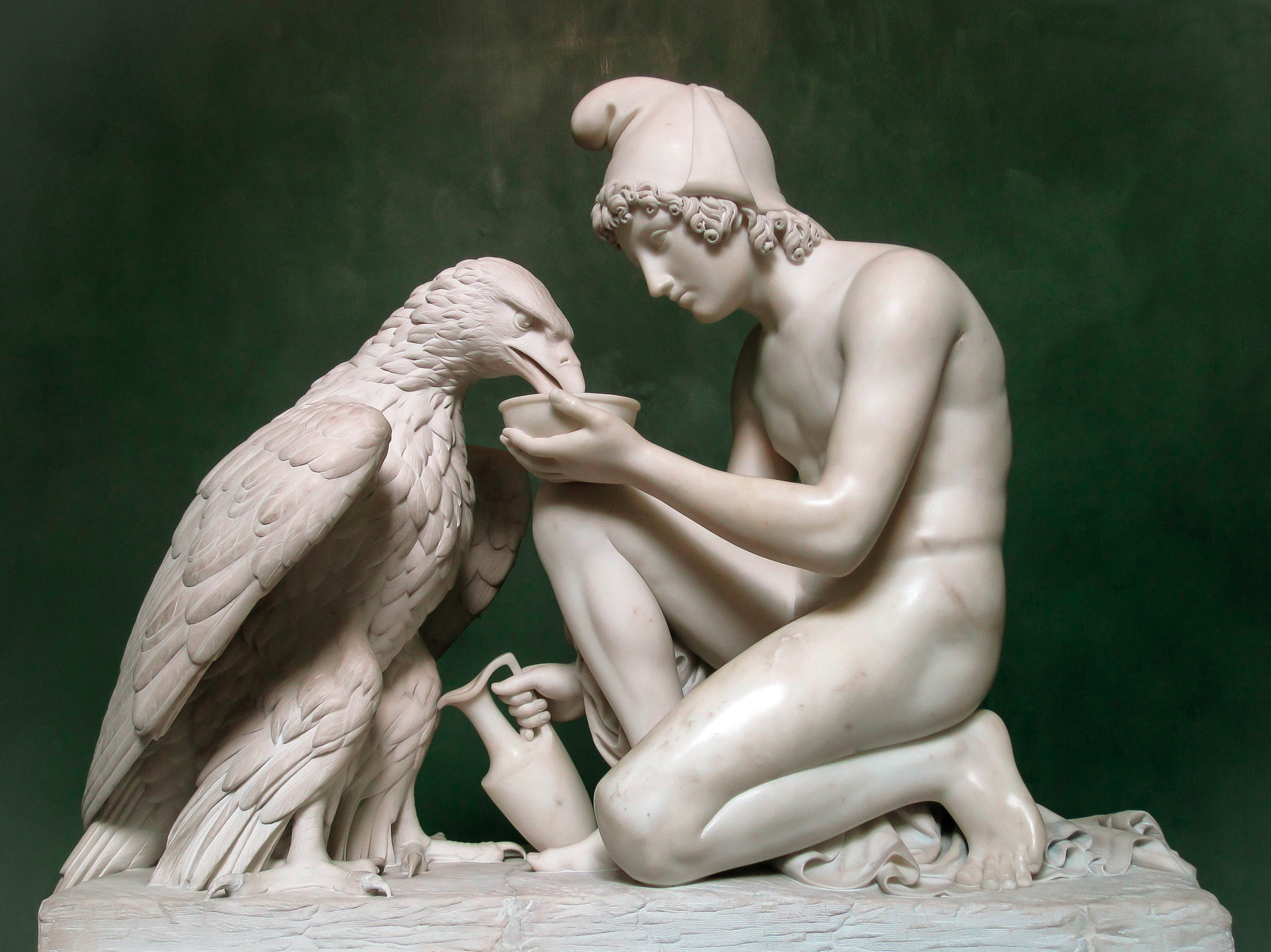
- Artist: Bertel Thorvaldsen
- Year: c. 1817
- Movement: Neoclassicism
- Subject: Marble sculpture
- Dimensions: 99.3 cm × 118.3 cm (39.1 in × 46.6 in)
- Location: Thorvaldsen Museum, Copenhagen

Ganymede and the Eagle or Ganymede with Jupiter's Eagle (Ganymedes med Jupiters ørn) is a sculpture by the Danish artist Bertel Thorvaldsen. There are several specimens; the most famous is exhibited in the Thorvaldsen Museum in Copenhagen. Other marble specimens can be found in the Chrysler Museum of Art in Norfolk, Virginia, United States, the Heim Gallery in London, the Kennedy Galleries in New York, at the Killruddery House in Bray in Ireland, at the Minneapolis Institute of Art in the United States, in the Museum of Fine Arts in Leipzig, Germany and at the Pinacoteca Tosio Martinengo in Brescia, Italy. The Boston Athenaeum and The Thorvaldsen Museum also own two plaster specimens. His marble copy was made in Italy from 1815 onwards, brought from Livorno to Copenhagen on the Danish corvette Galathea in 1833 and left to the museum after the artist's death in 1844.

== Iconography ==
In Greek mythology, Ganymede was a Trojan prince who was the most beautiful of all mortals. Zeus, who corresponds to Jupiter in Roman mythology, fell in love with him and abducted him to Olympus with the help of an eagle, sometimes identified as Zeus himself. Ganymede then lived in eternal youth as a cup-bearer of the gods.

== History ==
Thorvaldsen was a representative of Neoclassicism and was considered by his contemporaries to be the most important sculptor next to Antonio Canova. He stayed in Rome from 1797 to 1838, where he was a central figure for Scandinavian and German artists, who undertook the grand tour to study ancient Roman culture.

Thorvaldsen created a total of five different sculptures and two reliefs of Ganymede. The first marble version of Ganymede and the Eagle was commissioned by George Leveson-Gower, 1st Duke of Sutherland, who visited Rome in the spring of 1817. During his stay in Rome, he also commissioned a bust of himself from Thorvaldsen as well as a copy of the artist's Charites relief. His commission of Ganymede and the Eagle was probably based on seeing some sort of sketch, either in the form of a drawing, a small clay statuette, or possibly a full-size model in clay or plaster. Leveson-Gower's sculpture was not completed until 1829. In a letter dated 4 January 1830, he confirmed that the sculpture had arrived safely in London. In 1966, Gower's version was presented by The Morse Foundation to the Minneapolis Institute of Art.

The history of the other versions of the sculpture is less well documented. According to Bertel Thorvaldsen, a second version was also being produced in 1824. This statue may be identical to a marble version of Ganymedes and the Eagle which was sent to Copenhagen on board the corvette Galathea in 1833. Another version of the statue, possibly the original plaster model, was also on board the ship. After Thorvaldsen's death, these statues were included in the collection of the Thorvaldsen Museum. Another marble version was owned by M. Hottinguer in Paris in the middle of the 19th century.

The art historian Fritz Baumgart that the sculpture is characterized by "eerie beauty" and is unsurpassed in its perfection of form. Ganymede, with his smooth skin and trusting gaze, kneels in front of the eagle, whose plumage is carefully crafted. Thorvaldsen chose neither the motif of the violent abduction of the boy nor that of the handsome youth as cup-bearer for this sculpture. Instead, it is depicted how the power of the father of the gods and the ferocity of the predator are united in the eagle, which in turn are defeated by beauty and love. In art, the relationship between Zeus and Ganymede is usually portrayed as erotic.

Thorvaldsen portrayed Ganymede as a cup-bearer in two other sculptures: in the sculpture Ganymedes skænker i skålen (Ganymede filling the bowl, 1816) and in the sculpture Ganymedes rækker skålen (Ganymede hands over the bowl, plaster version around 1805, marble version 1820s). Both are exhibited in the Thorvaldsen Museum.

== Image gallery ==
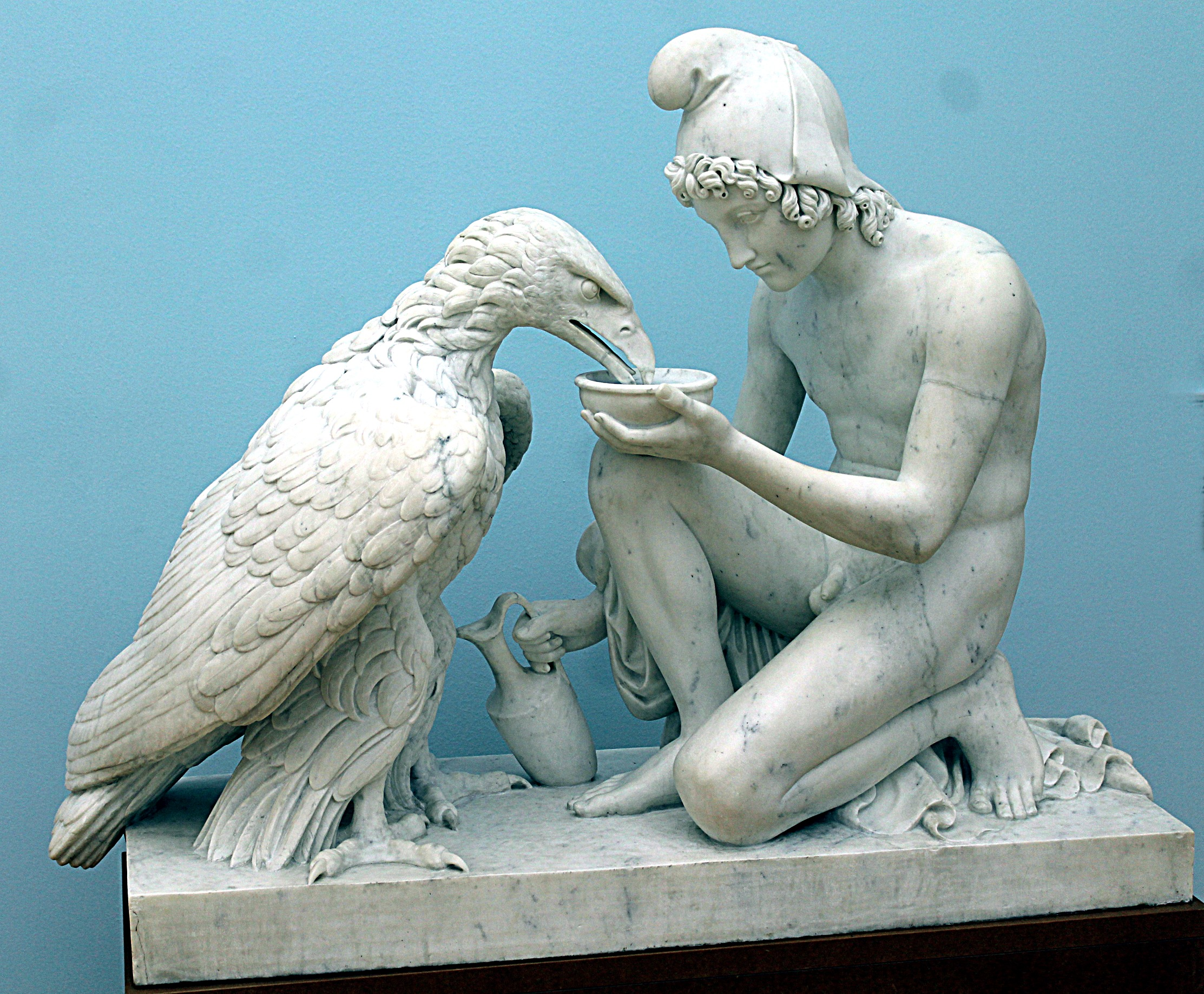
Marble sculpture, donated to the Museum of Fine Arts in Leipzig in 1864

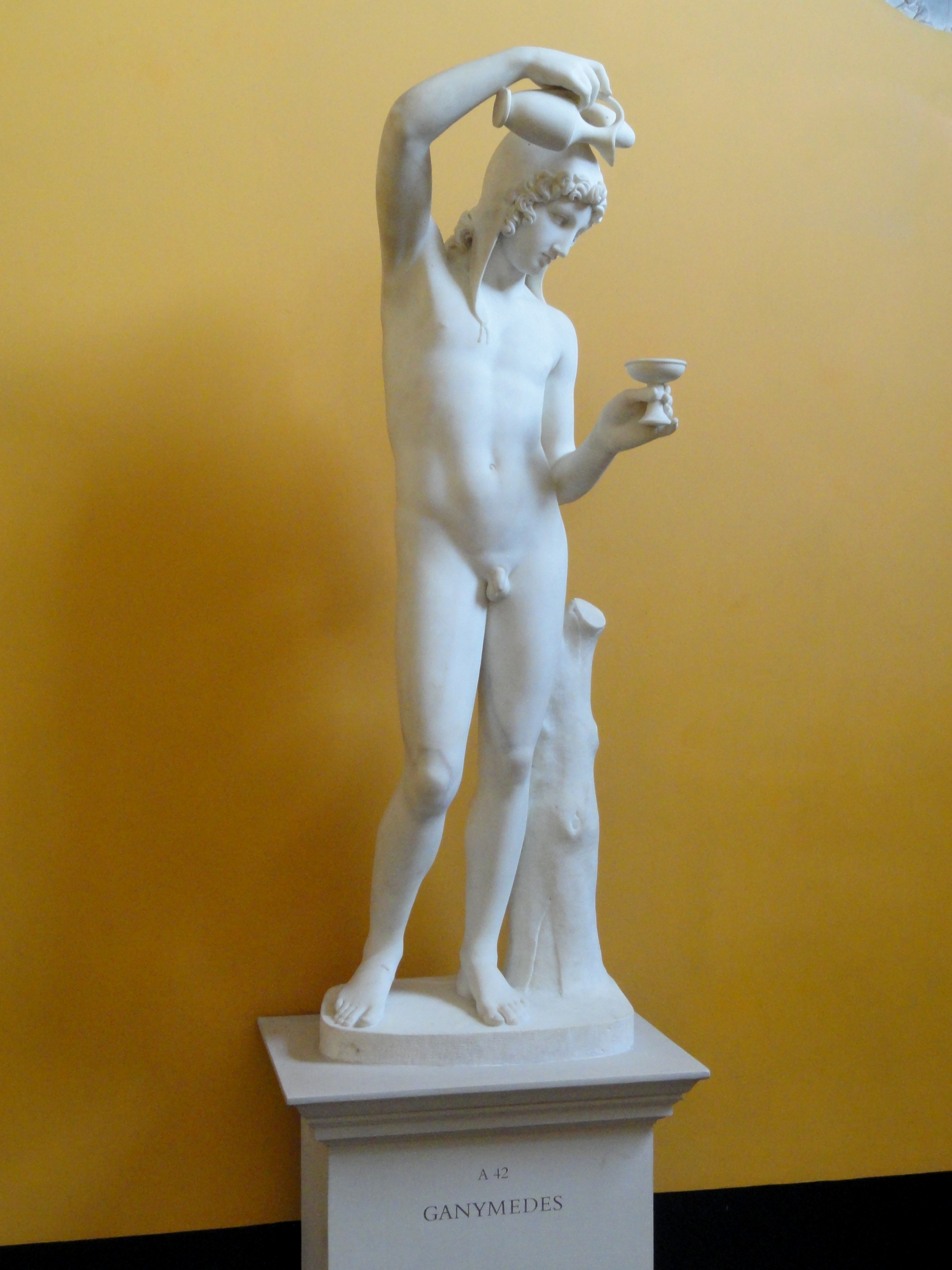
The sculpture Ganymede filling the bowl from 1816. Thorvaldsen Museum.

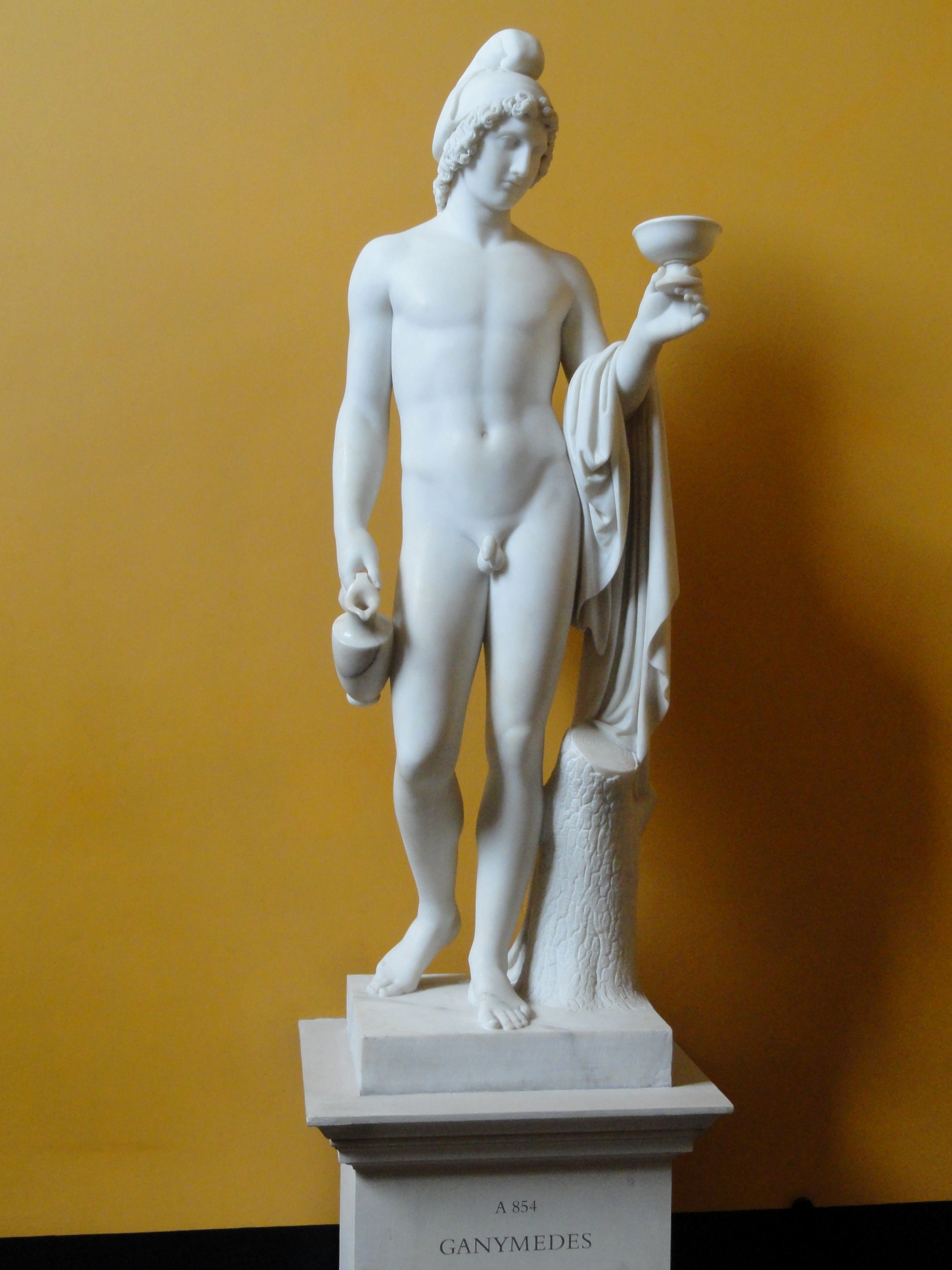
The sculpture Ganymede hands over the bowl from the 1820s. Thorvaldsen Museum.
