= Gustav Kirstein =

German publisher and art collector (1870–1934)

Gustav Kirstein (born 24 February 1870 in Berlin; died 14 February 1934 in Leipzig) was a German publisher, writer, and art collector of Jewish descent.

== Life ==
Kirstein was the son of a medical doctor. He first studied pharmacy, graduated, worked as a pharmacy assistant for a year, and then turned to the publishing book trade. Later he worked for the publishing house E. A. Seemann, of which he became a partner on 1 October 1899. Later, he was initially managing director of the publishing house. In 1923, Ernst Arthur Elert Heinrich Seemann's son, Elert Seemann (1892-1989), became a partner in the management of the publishing house. He had joined the Nazi party at an early stage.

Kirstein was the founder and publisher of the journal Der Kunstmarkt (1904-1926) and the "Dehmel-Gesellschaft" as well as the owner of the Leipzig cliché company "Kirstein & Co." and "Wendler, Kirstein & Co." respectively, whose office was located at Hospitalstr. 11a in Leipzig. He wrote articles on copyright for the Börsenverein der Deutschen Buchhändler. Starting in May 1904, he was also a member of the German Book Trade Association. Kirstein actively campaigned on the issue of copyright in the years from 1927 onwards for the retention of the 30-year term of protection for literature, and even conducted a collection of signatures for this purpose, to which more than 800 well-known personalities gave their signatures.

On 26 June 1922 Kirstein was awarded an honorary doctorate by the Technical University of Aachen "in recognition of his services to the dissemination and deepening of art historical research, which he has acquired as a publisher and as editor and director of art historical journals, and finally as an author of writings on art".

== Art collector ==
Kirstein was chairman of the "Leipziger Bibliophilen-Abend" from May 1912 until the beginning of 1930. Together with his wife Cläre "Clara" Therese (née Stein, 18 May 1885, to 1939), he was also active as an art collector. According to the Dutch Restitution Committee "Kirstein was a friend and patron of many leading artists of his day, including Max Liebermann, Lovis Corinth and Max Klinger. During his lifetime Gustav Kirstein accumulated a large art collection by such artists as Max Klinger, Max Liebermann, Edouard Manet, Adolph Menzel, Lovis Corinth, Käthe Kollwitz, Georg Kolbe, Carl Spitzweg and Hans Thoma." Kirstein was chairman of the Leipziger Kunstverein.

== Nazi persecution, suicide, seizure of art collection ==
After the Nazis came to power in Germany in 1933, Kirstein was forced to give up all public offices. He was urged by Seemann to leave the publishing house at the end of June 1933. When he died in 1934, his wife took over the management of the publishing house until its closure in 1938.

The Kirstein's art collection was confiscated by the Gestapo in 1939 and handed over to the Leipzig art gallery C.G. Boerner. Forty-four works were placed with the storage firm Erhardt Schneider. Therese Clara Kirstein died by suicide in 1939 after her escape to the United States was blocked.

Kunstsammlung

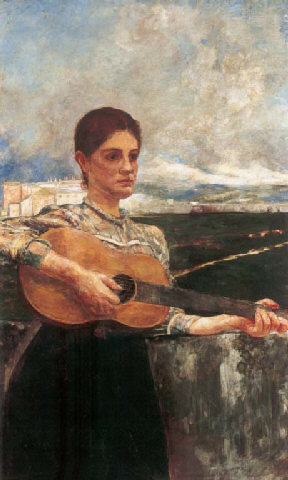
Max Klinger:
Die Lautenspielerin

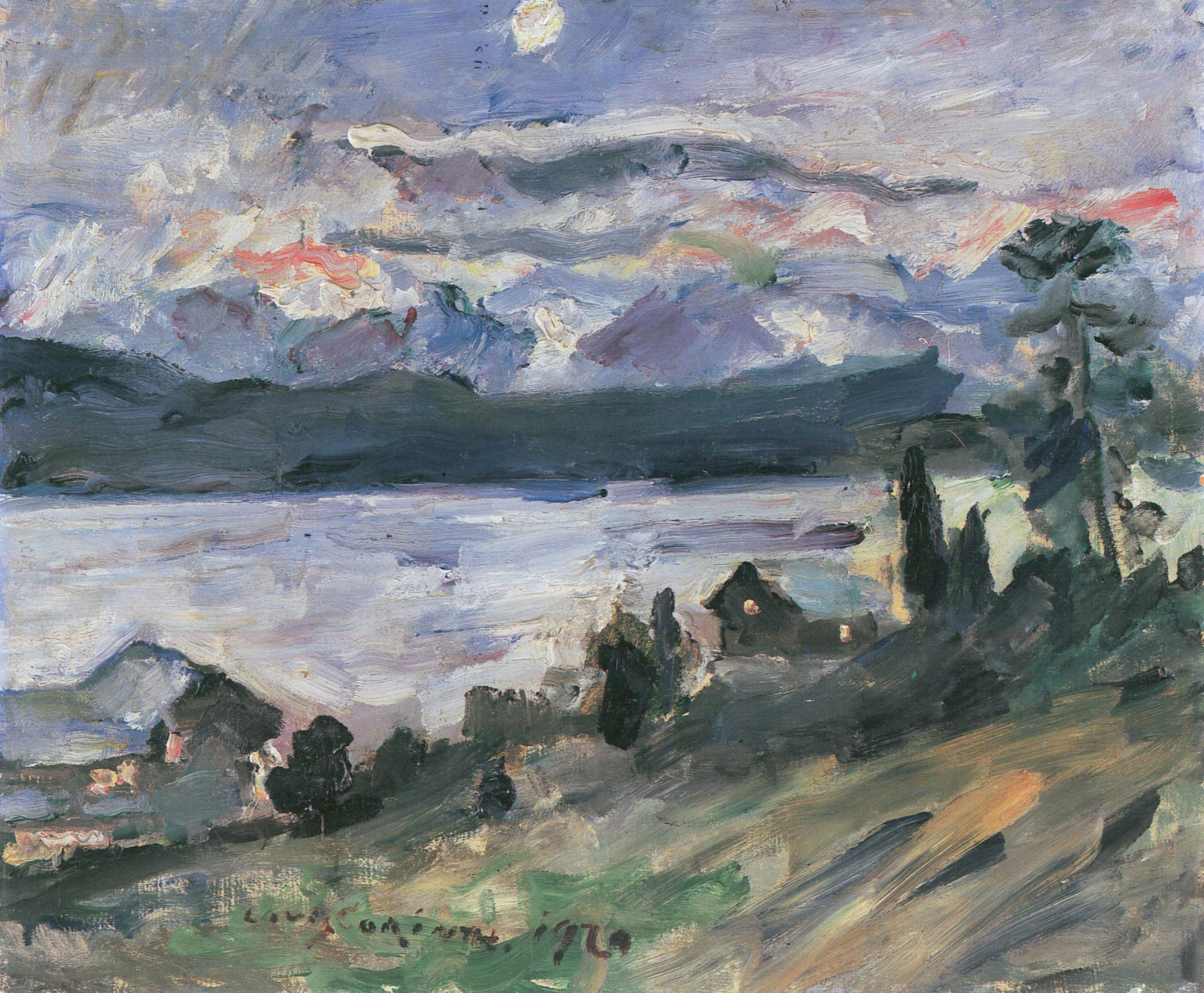
Lovis Corinth:
Walchensee, Johannisnacht

== Family ==
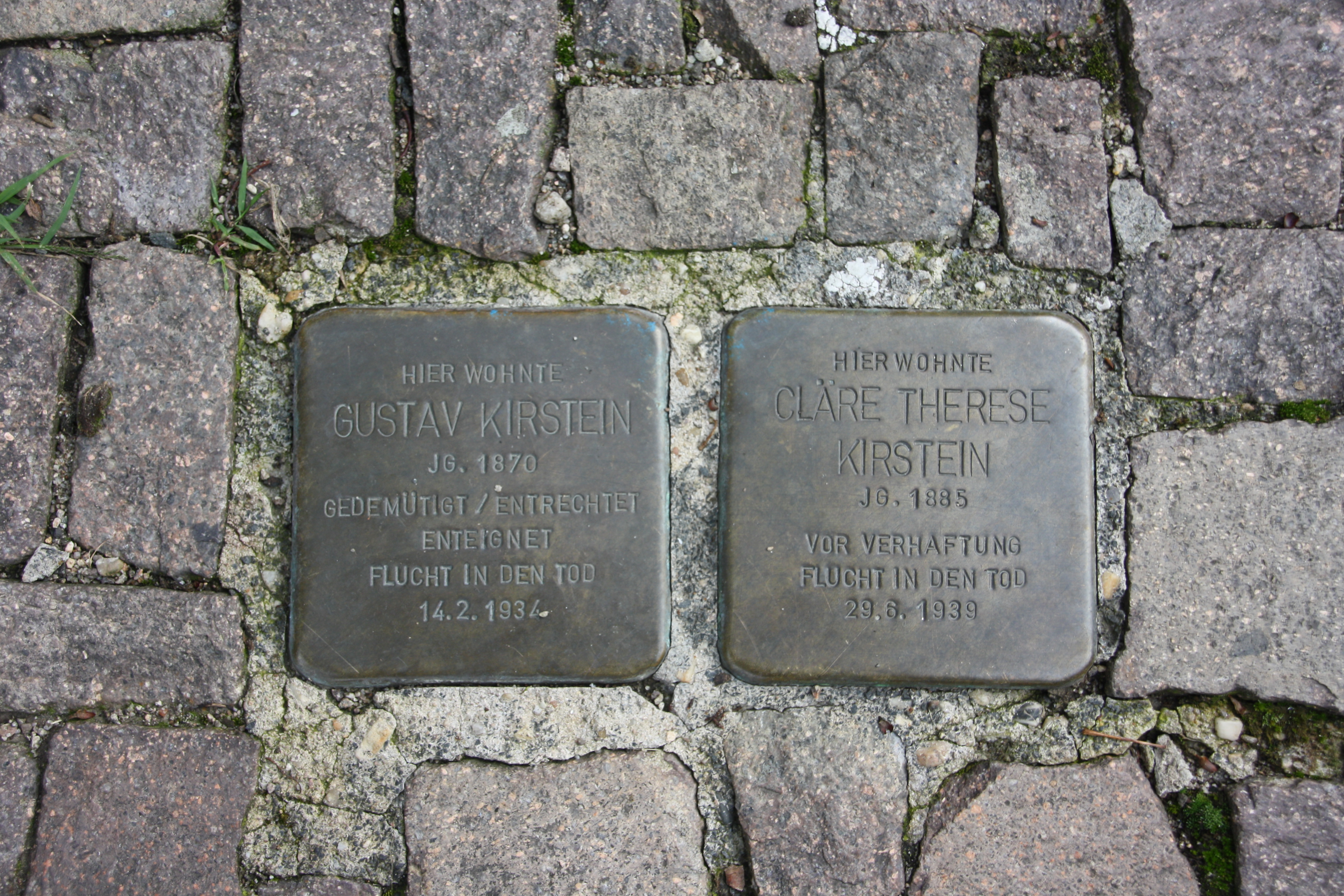
Stolpersteine in Leipzig

Kirstein's marriage produced two daughters, who emigrated from Germany at an early age, Gabriele (born 1905) and Marianne (born 1907).

== Restitution of Nazi-looted art ==
In 1964, the Kirstein family requested compensation for seizures under the Nazis but their request was rejected by authorities.

However, in 1998 44 countries endorsed guidelines to re-examine museum collections and archives to search for the lost assets of Nazi Holocaust victims at the Washington Conference On Holocaust-Era Assets and the attitude of the authorities changed. In 2000, two German museums returned more than 80 works of art to Kirstein's heirs. Restituted paintings included The Lute Player by Max Klinger and Walchensee, Johannisnacht by Lovis Corinth and Three Studies of Heads of Women (1883) by Max Klinger. The latter was restituted to the Kirstein heirs by the Museum der Bildenden Künste, Leipzig (then Städtisches Museum Leipzig).

In 2020, a provenance researcher at the Georg Schäfer Museum in northern Bavaria, in Germany, quit her job in a protest against the museum's failure to be serious about returning artworks with tainted provenances. Works from the Kirstein family's collection were among those that caused her concern.

== Writings (selection) ==
- Zur Frage "30 oder 50 Jahre" Aufruf für Beibehaltung der 30-jährigen Schutzfrist [Betreffend Schutzfrist für Werke der Literatur]. 1930.
- Die Verhandlungen über den Urheberrechtsschutz zwischen Deutschland und der U.d.S.S.R. Börsenverein der Deutschen Buchhändler. 1931.
- Max Liebermann zum 60. Geburtstage. Vol. Neue Folge, 18. Jahrgang. E.A. Seemann. 1907. p. 237.
- Neuere Arbeiten von Georg Kolbe. E. A. Seemann. 1908. p. 199.
- Das Leben Adolph Menzels. E. A. Seemann. 1919

As publisher

- Die Welt Max Klingers. Furche. 1917.
- Max Klinger : sechs farbige Wiedergaben seiner Werke. E. A. Seemanns Künstlermappen. E.A. Seemann. 1921.
- Tagebuch 1893–1894. Drucke der Dehmel-Gesellschaft. Staatliche Akademie für graphische Künste und Buchgewerbe. 1921. OCLC 162756345.
- Mein Leben. Drucke der Dehmel-Gesellschaft. Dehmel-Gesellschaft. 1922. OCLC 654273607.

== Literature ==
- Der Verleger von Morgen, wie wir ihn wünschen. Verlag der Freunde Kirsteins. 1930.
- Kirstein, Gustav, Verleger. Vol. Band 5: Hitz – Kozub. Walter de Gruyter. 2006. p. 651. ISBN 3-11-094653-X.
- Raubkunst: Peinliche Verzögerungen. In: Der Spiegel. Nr. 40, 2000 (online).
- books.google.de%5d&pg=PA726 Illegaler Kulturgüterverkehr. Walter de Gruyter. 2010. p. 726. ISBN 978-3-89949-723-6.
- books.google.de%5d&pg=PA160 E. A. Seemann Buch- und Kunstverlag, Leipzig. Ch. Links Verlag. 2013. p. 160. ISBN 978-3-86284-256-8.
- Kirstein, Gustav. In: Joseph Walk (Hrsg.): Kurzbiographien zur Geschichte der Juden 1918–1945. Saur, München 1988, ISBN 3-598-10477-4, S. 194.

== See also ==
- The Holocaust
- Aryanization
- List of claims for restitution for Nazi-looted art
- Nazi Plunder
