= Judgment of Paris (Cranach, New York) =

Painting by Lucas Cranach the Elder

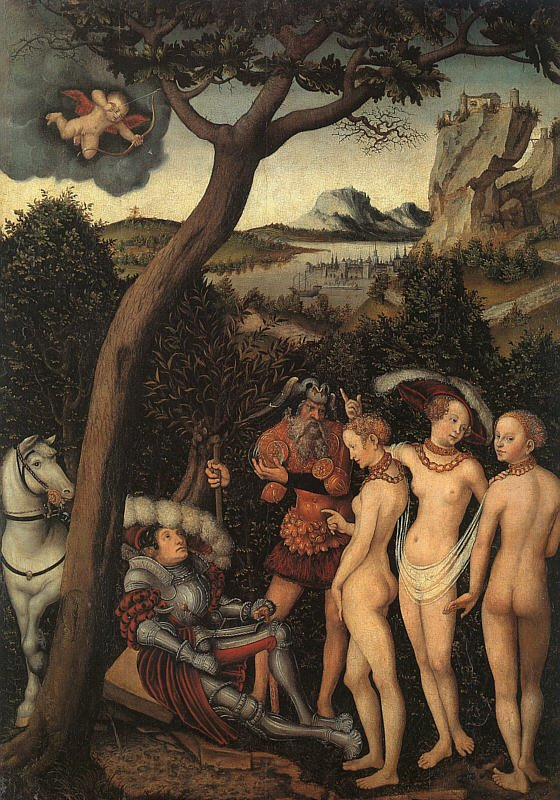
- Artist: Lucas Cranach the Elder
- Year: 1528
- Medium: oil on wood
- Dimensions: 101.9 cm × 71.1 cm (40.1 in × 28.0 in)
- Location: Metropolitan Museum of Art, New York

The Judgment of Paris is a 1528 painting by the German artist Lucas Cranach the Elder. It depicts the myth of Paris, Prince of Troy, selecting the fairest goddess from among Minerva, Juno, and Venus. Cranach likely based his depiction on medieval poetry or romances. The painting is now in the Metropolitan Museum of Art, New York.
