= The Three Graces (Cranach) =

Painting by Lucas Cranach the Elder (Louvre)

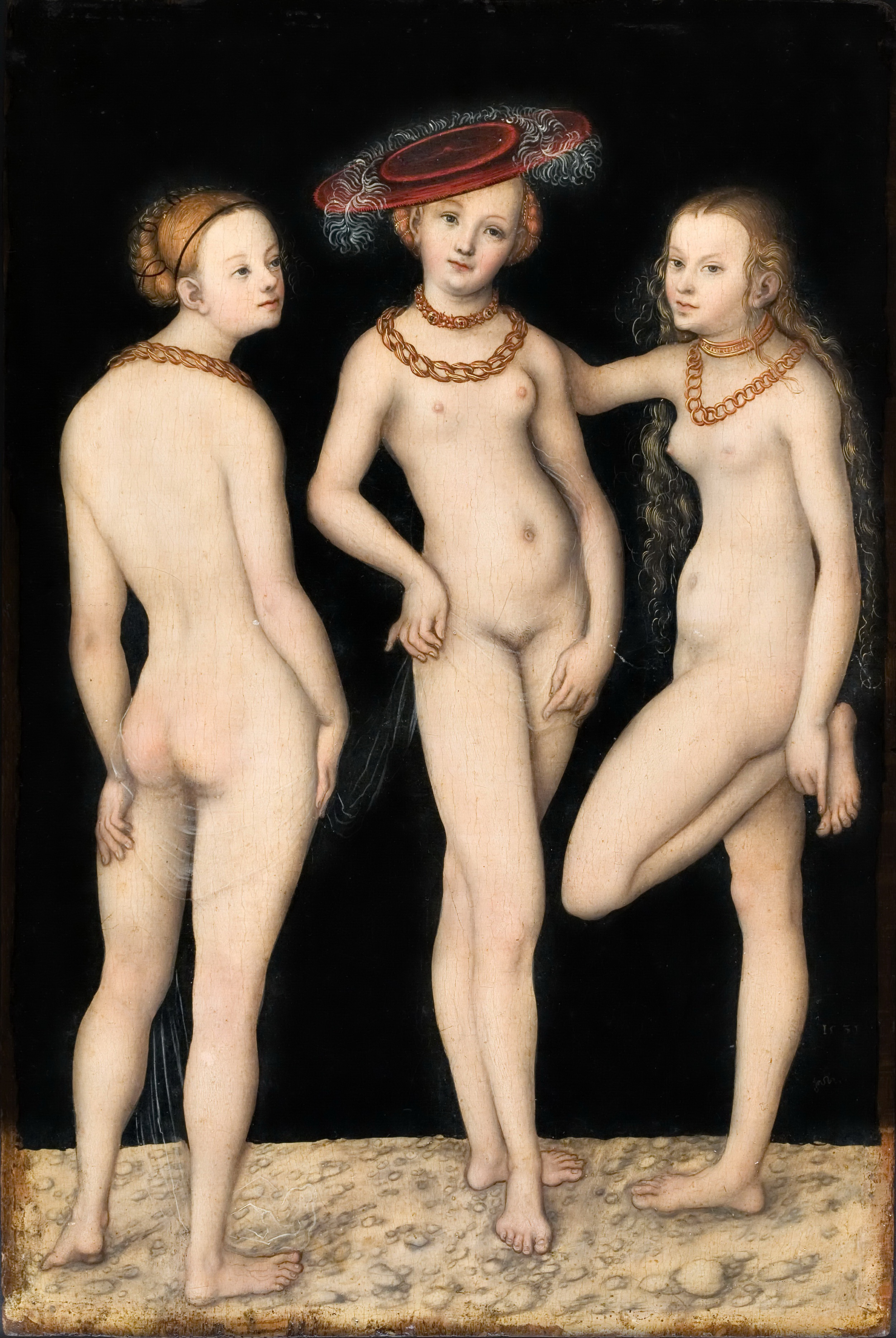
- Artist: Lucas Cranach the Elder
- Year: 1531
- Medium: oil on panel
- Dimensions: 36 cm × 24 cm (14 in × 9.4 in)
- Location: Louvre Museum, Paris

The Three Graces is an oil painting on beech panel of 1531 by Lucas Cranach the Elder. Other versions of the subject by the artist from 1530 and 1535 are in a private collection and the Nelson-Atkins Museum of Art, Kansas City respectively.

It remained in private collections until - under risk of being sold abroad - it was declared a national treasure (i.e. subject to an export bar). The owners' asking price was 4,000,000 Euros, which needed to be raised before the end of January 2011. Three-quarters of this was raised from the museum's own funds and large donations from two French businesses.

An appeal to raise the remaining 1,000,000 Euros was launched on 13 November 2010 on the theme of "Tous mécènes" (loosely translated as "Everyone can be an art patron"). It proved highly successful, with around 7,000 people making donations, and the whole sum was raised by 17 December 2010, at which date the Louvre bought the work. It was first publicly displayed in 2011 and assigned the catalogue number RF 2011-1.
