= Carl Sonntag =

German bookbinder (1883–1930)

Carl Sonntag Jr.
- Born: Carl Sonntag; 21 July 1883; Leipzig, Kingdom of Saxony, German Empire
- Died: 20 August 1930 (aged 47); Berlin, Germany
- Occupations: Bookbinder; cover designer
- Years active: 1907–1913; 1930
- Known for: Bibliophile bindings; cover designs for Hans von Weber’s Hundertdrucke; co-founding the Jakob-Krauße-Bund
- Spouse: Laura Kern (m. 1917)
- Children: 3

Carl Sonntag Jr. (21 July 1883 – 20 August 1930), was a German art bookbinder and cover designer. He played a key role in the creation and advancement of Germany's Book Art Movement.

== Early life and education ==
Carl Sonntag Jr. was born in Leipzig on 21 July 1883, the son of a raw tobacco wholesaler, Carl Sonntag Sr. He was the second of four siblings.

After attending school and graduating from Thomas Gymnasium, he completed an apprenticeship as a bookbinder at Roßberg'sche Buchhandlung. He then traveled to France and England to train further, including in the workshop of Sangorski & Sutcliffe. In 1905, Sonntag was one of the first members of the Leipzig Bibliophile Evening, founded by Fedor von Zobeltitz. There he met representatives of the book art scene, such as the publishers Eugen Diederichs, Anton Kippenberg, Ernst Rowohlt and Julius Zeitler, the print shop owners Carl Ernst Poeschel and Johannes Baensch-Drugulin, the book artist Walter Tiemann, and the author Ricarda Huch.

== Career ==
In 1907, Carl Sonntag Jr. opened his first bookbindery at Sternwartenstraße 19 in Leipzig, and his work included the luxury publications of Janus Presse, Ernst Ludwig Presse and the Hans von Weber publishing house. From 1909, he produced the covers for the special editions of Hans von Weber's Hundertdrucke.

In 1912, together with Paul Kersten, he founded the Jakob-Krauße-Bund, and in the same year, he moved into new premises at Albertstraße 28 (now Riemannstraße). Later in 1912, Frieda Thiersch, the future head of the Bremen Bindery, came to train under Sonntag.

Also in 1912, Carl Sonntag Jr. wrote the auction catalog Kostbare Bucheinbände des XV. bis XIX. Jahrhunderts for the Leipzig antiquarian bookshop C. G. Boerner, an illustrated work in German and French with a personal foreword. In 1913, Sonntag was involved in preparations for the 1914 International World Exhibition of Decorative Arts and Prints by setting up a traditional bookbinding workshop.

He dissolved his business at the end of 1913, and in 1914, he joined his father's raw tobacco business at Königstraße 61, which he ran until 1929. In 1914, Sonntag sold part of his extensive collection of historical bookbinding tools to the Insel Verlag. In 1917, Sonntag married Laura Kern, who had worked as a secretary in his bindery since 1910.

In 1930, he opened a new bookbinding workshop at Hafenplatz 6 in Berlin. He died on 20 August 1930 following kidney surgery.

== Art collection ==
Laura and Carl Sonntag's Leipzig art collection contained a large number of works, including valuable works by Jakob van Utrecht, Carl Spitzweg, Heinrich Vogeler, Adolph von Menzel, Célestin Nanteuil, Hermann Haller and Renée Sintenis. The private collection consisted of paintings, prints and sculptural works in styles including Mannerist, late Romantic, and modern art, such as Art Nouveau.

During the Nazi era following Sonntag's death, Laura Sonntag was persecuted due to her Jewish heritage. She was forced to emigrate to the United States with her three children, leaving behind the family's property. Sonntag's tools, along with many valuable bindings and other artworks, were auctioned off during the Aryanization of Jewish assets. The City History Museum, the Leipzig City Library, the Museum of Fine Arts, as well as military departments, a polyclinic, and private individuals, acquired items from their household. Dr. Johannes Hofmann, the director of the City Library at the time, collaborated with the Gestapo to have Sonntag's bindings confiscated before the auction and added to the library's collection. Sonntag's tools were auctioned off in August 1942 to a Leipzig bookbinder, who shortly afterward sold them to the City Library as well. Part of Sonntag's collection was destroyed in a bombing raid on 4 December 1943. Attempts to restitute surviving books to Sonntag's daughters, around 50 years later, were unsuccessful.

=== Restitution efforts ===
On September 28, 1990, the Sonntag family made a restitution claim concerning artworks in the Leipzig Museum of Fine Arts. Following a positive decision by the Leipzig Property Office on April 27, 1994, the items were restituted.

== Bibliography ==
- Lina Frubrich: Die Erwerbung aus dem Hausrat Sonntag beim Versteigerungshaus Hans Klemm. In: Dies., Anselm Hartinger (Hrsg.): Vergessene (Rück)ansichten. Provenienzforschung im Stadtgeschichtlichen Museum Leipzig. Leipzig 2022, ISBN 978-3-910034-89-1, S. 46–53.
- Helma Schäfer: Ein deutscher Buchbinder par excellence – Carl Sonntag jun. (1883–1930). In: Kieser/Schlenker (Hrsg.): Mitteldeutsches Jahrbuch für Kultur und Geschichte 2013. Deutsche Stiftung Denkmalschutz, Monumente-Publikationen, Bonn 2013. Band 20, S. 84 ff.
- Helma Schäfer: Das moderne Einbandschaffen als Gegenstand der Einbandforschung: Zwei Leipziger Buchbinder als Fallbeispiele – Carl Sonntag jun. und Otto Ulrich Fischer. In: Einband-Forschung 2009, Nr. 24, Ss. 87–96.
- Carl Sonntag jun.: Vom Bucheinband. In: Das Moderne Buch. Die graphischen Künste der Gegenwart. Band 3, Stuttgart 1910.
- Carl Sonntag jun.: Leder und Bucheinband. In: Zwiebelfisch 3. Jahrgang 1912, Heft 5 und 6. München, Verlag Hans von Weber 1912.
