= Michael Hanack =

German chemist (1931–2019)

Georg Michael Hanack
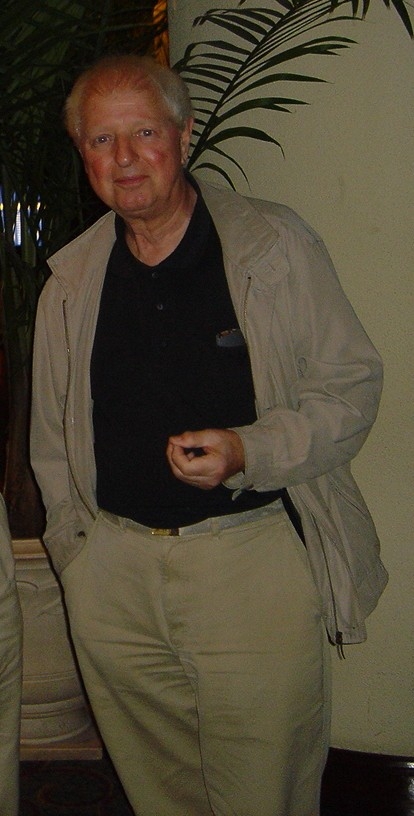
- Born: 22 October 1931; Luckenwalde, Germany
- Died: 6 November 2019 (aged 88); Tübingen, Germany
- Citizenship: German
- Education: University of Tübingen
- Known for: Vinyl cations, Phthalocyanines
- Awards: 1966 Lifetime Honorary Membership (New York Academy of Sciences); 1988 Invited Fellow (Japan Society for the Promotion of Science); 1991 Honorary Degree Dr. h.c. (Complutense University of Madrid); 2000 Arthur G. Dandridge Award; 2002 Elhuyar-Goldschmid Award
- Scientific career
- Fields: Chemistry
- Workplaces: University of Tübingen
- Doctoral advisor: Walter Hückel

Georg Michael Hanack (22 October 1931 – 6 November 2019) was a professor of chemistry at the University of Tübingen in Germany.

== Life and career ==
Hanack was born in Luckenwalde on 22 October 1931. From 1949 to 1954 he studied chemistry, philosophy and economics at the universities of Freiburg, Bonn and Tübingen, and obtained his Diplomchemiker degree in 1954. In 1957, he completed his thesis under the supervision of Walter Hückel on "Solvolyse der Toluolsulfonate der stereoisomeren cis-alpha-Hydrindanole und Beiträge zur Messmethodik" (Solvolysis of toluenesulfonates of stereoisomeric cis-alpha-hydrindanoles and contributions to the methodology of kinetic measurements).

After being an assistant to Hückel from 1957 to 1958, Hanack conducted his own research on topics such as organofluorine chemistry, organic chemistry and stereochemistry. After his habilitation in 1961, he was granted the title Privatdozent when he was only 31 years old, at that time one of the youngest Privatdozenten in Germany. He was promoted to Professor extraordinarius at the University of Tübingen in 1968 and was offered the chair as professor of organic chemistry and head of the department at the Saarland University in 1970. In April 1975 he returned to the University of Tübingen as professor of organic chemistry, succeeding Eugen Müller. He was there also dean of the Faculty of Chemistry and Pharmacy from 1981 to 1983, and head of the Department of Chemistry from 1995 to 2001. From 2001 to 2019 he was Professor emeritus and continued his research work.

== Research fields ==
Hanack researched:

- Organic fluorine compounds and perfluorinated pyrethroids
- Stereochemistry and conformational analysis
- Organic reaction mechanisms and chemistry of vinyl and phenyl cations
- Synthesis of macroheterocyclic transition metal complexes (such as phthalocyanines) as intrinsic organic conductors ("shish-kebab" polymers)
- Compounds with magnetic and non-linear optical properties

== Selected publications ==
- Fluorverbindungen der Terpenreihe: Reaktionen des Fluorwasserstoffs mit Doppelbindungen und Dreiringen, Tübingen, 1962
- Hanack, Michael (1965). Conformation theory. New York: Academic Press. ISBN 978-0-12-322550-4. OCLC 545393.
- Stang, Peter (1979). Vinyl cations. New York: Academic Press. ISBN 978-0-12-663780-9. OCLC 5410540. online at Elsevier
- Michael Hanack, Siegmar Roth, Hermann Schier: Science and Technology of Synthetic Metals, 1991

== Working group ==
In his function as doctoral advisor, he had more than 230 doctoral students in addition to many postdoctoral students and guest researchers who studied in his laboratory.

== Editorial work ==
- 1982–2003: Editorial Board of Houben-Weyl Methods of Organic Chemistry (Thieme Medical Publishers)
- 1985–1998: Editorial Advisory Board of Synthesis (journal) (Thieme Medical Publishers)
- 1999–2008: Honorary Advisory Board of Synthesis (journal) (Thieme Medical Publishers)
- 2004–2008: Editorial Board of Synthetic Metals (Elsevier)
- since 1997: Editorial Board of Journal of Porphyrins and Phthalocyanines (John Wiley & Sons, World Scientific)
