= Ulrich Thieme =

German art historian (1865–1922)

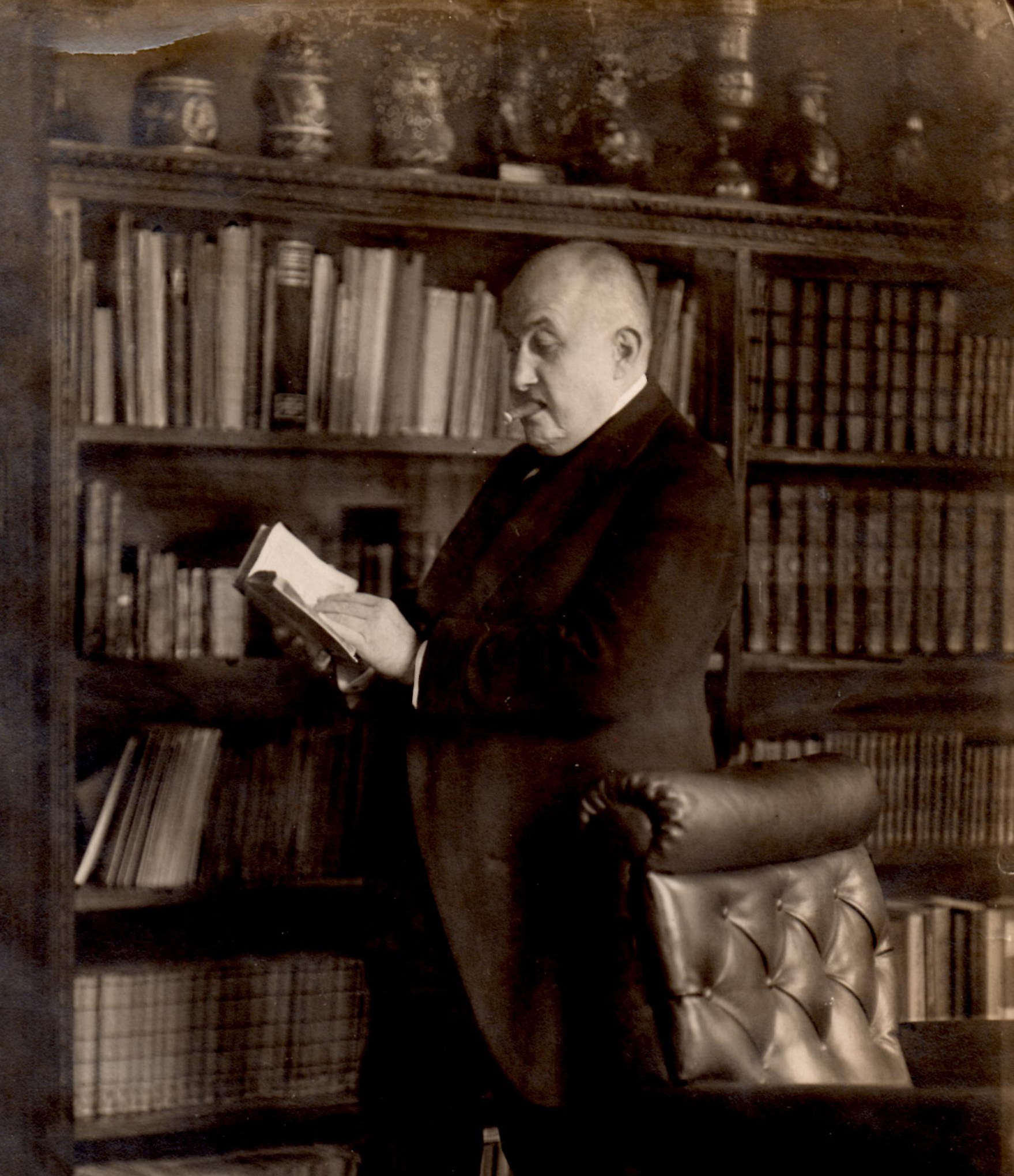

Ulrich Thieme (31 January 1865 in Leipzig – 25 March 1922 in Leipzig) was a German art historian. He was the son of the industrialist and art collector Alfred Thieme (1830–1906), brother of the publisher Georg Thieme (1830–1906) and grandfather of the painter Peter Flinsch (1920–2010).

== Life ==
He attended the Alte Nikolaischule in Leipzig and passed the Abitur in 1886. He enrolled at the Ruprecht-Karls-Universität Heidelberg for chemistry and physics and became active in the Corps Guestphalia Heidelberg in 1886. He changed to the Humboldt University of Berlin and the Leipzig University. In 1887 he also joined theCorps Misnia Leipzig. In his home town Leipzig he studied art history and archaeology from 1888 to 1891. With a doctoral thesis about the painter and graphic artist Hans Leonhard Schäufelein with Anton Springer he was awarded the Dr. phil. in 1892.

After travelling through various countries, he was with Wilhelm von Bode at the Gemäldegalerie Berlin from 1893 to 1896, research assistant and finally provisional assistant director. Since 1896 he worked in Leipzig as private scholar. In 1898/99 he was Richard Graul Editor of the Zeitschrift für bildende Kunst (publisher E. A. Seemann). Besides he began with Felix Becker the preliminary work for his main work, the publication of the General Encyclopedia of Visual Artists from Antiquity to the Present, of which the first volume appeared in 1907 and 14 volumes were available until his death. The 15th volume appeared posthumously under his editorship)

== Works as editor ==
- Galerie Alfred Thieme in Leipzig. Breitkopf & Härtel, Leipzig 1900.
- Sammlung Jul. Otto Gottschald in Leipzig. Breitkopf & Härtel, Leipzig 1901.
- Allgemeines Lexikon der bildenden Künstler von der Antike bis zur Gegenwart. Band 1–15, Engelmann (later Seemann), Leipzig 1907–1922.

== Bibliography ==
- Bruno Volger (ed.): Sachsens Gelehrte, Künstler und Schriftsteller in Wort und Bild, vol. 1. Volger, Leipzig 1907, p. 184.
- Hans Vollmer: Ulrich Thieme. Repertorium für Kunstwissenschaft, vol. 44, Walter de Gruyter, Berlin und Leipzig 1924, p. 108–110.
- Hermann Christern (ed.): Deutsches Biographisches Jahrbuch. volume 4. Das Jahr 1922. Deutsche Verlagsanstalt, Stuttgart und Berlin 1929, p. 372.
- Rudolf Vierhaus (ed.): Deutsche Biographische Enzyklopädie, 2nd edition, Bd. 9, Saur, München 2008, ISBN 978-3-598-25039-2, p. 920.
- Christiane Fork: "Thieme, Ulrich", in Peter Betthausen, Peter H. Feist and Christiane Fork: Metzler-Kunsthistoriker-Lexikon. 2nd edition, Metzler, Stuttgart und Weimar 2007, ISBN 978-3-476-02183-0, p. 434–436.
