= Georg Thieme =

German publisher (1860–1925)

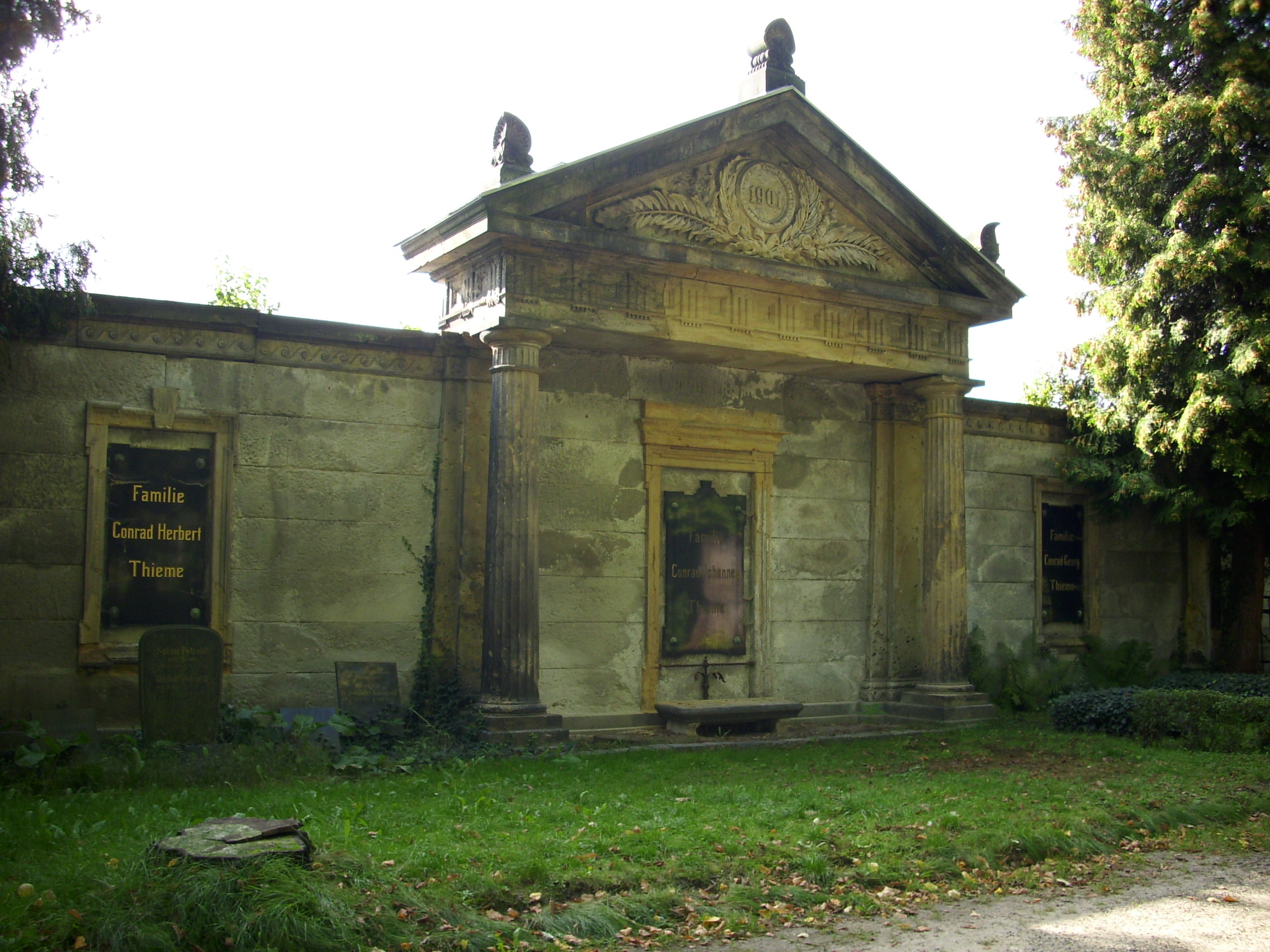
The Thieme family vault in Leipzig's Südfriedhof cemetery.

Georg Thieme (2 July 1860 – 26 December 1925) was a German publisher, notable for founding the Georg Thieme Verlags in 1886. It still operates as Thieme Medical Publishers. He was the son of the industrialist Alfred Thieme, and elder brother of the art historian Ulrich Thieme.
