= Going for a Walk in the Amsterdam Town Hall =

Painting by Pieter de Hooch

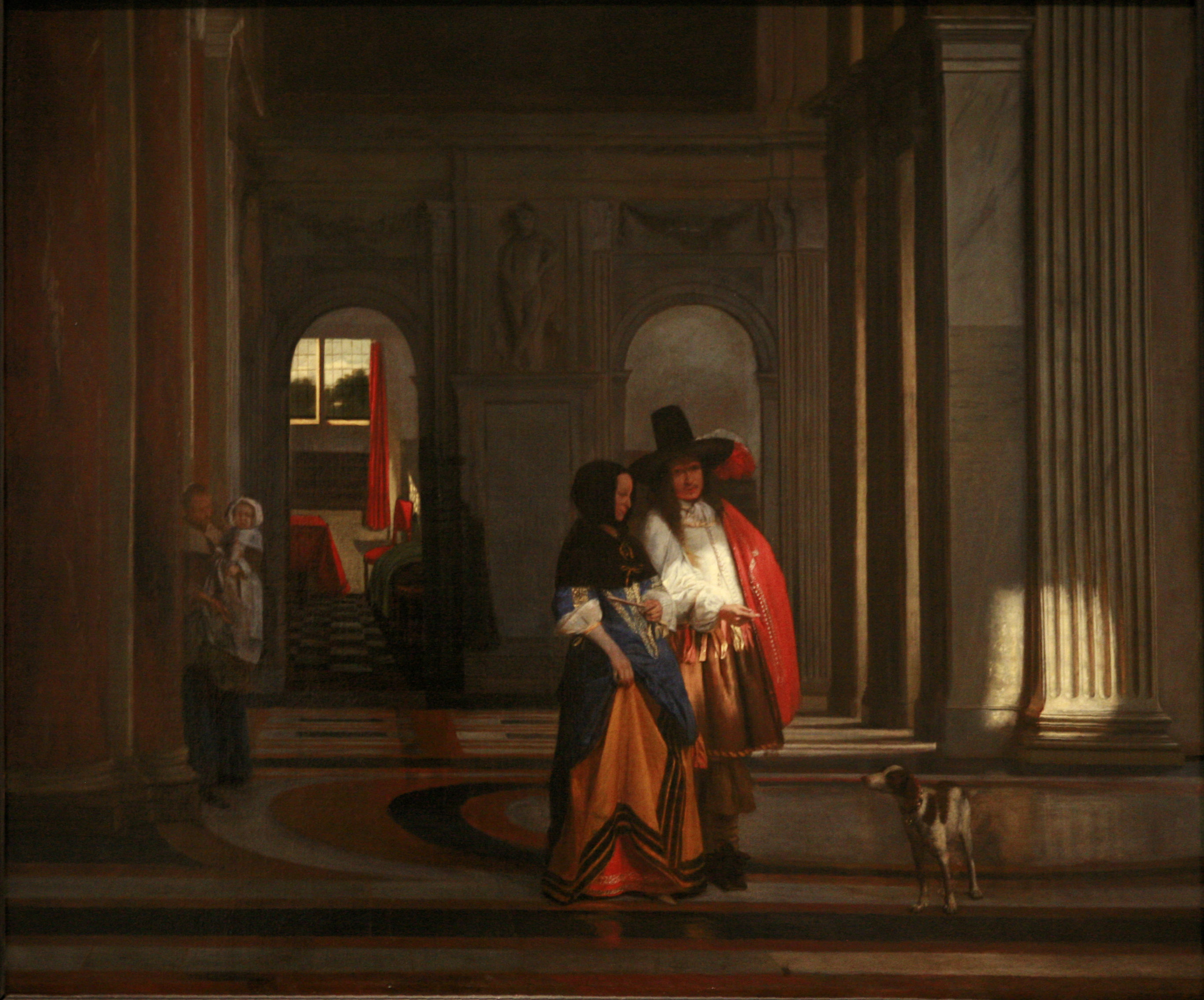
- Artist: Pieter de Hooch
- Year: c. 1663–1665
- Medium: Oil painting on canvas
- Movement: Dutch Golden Age painting Genre painting
- Dimensions: 72 cm × 85 cm (28 in × 33 in)
- Location: Musée des Beaux-Arts, Strasbourg
- Accession: 1890

Going for a Walk in the Amsterdam Town Hall (c. 1663–1665) is an oil-on-canvas painting by the Dutch painter Pieter de Hooch. It is an example of Dutch Golden Age painting and is now in the Musée des Beaux-Arts de Strasbourg, inventory number 213. This piece most likely originated during de Hooch's Amsterdam period considering the local setting.

== Description ==
In the Amsterdam Town Hall, now the Royal Palace of Amsterdam, an upper class couple walk through the building, built a mere decade earlier. The man wears a tall, cavalier-style, broad-brimmed hat accented with red and white feathers. In the fashion of the time, he also wears a white shirt with ruffled sleeves and collar, wearing a red cloak over one shoulder. The woman also wears a veil, partly concealing her gold-embroidered blue bodice, and with her right hand lifts up her yellow skirt.

To the right of them, a hunting-type dog appears to follow the couple. Behind them, through the columns, a nurse walks with a baby in their arms. This scene likely takes place in the south gallery, with the floor tiled in circles in the foreground and squares in the background. Columns stand on the left and pilasters on the right, acting as principal lines to lead the viewer into an open door at the back of the composition.through this door in this room, a high window and a table and chair lay, with the curtain, the table-cloth, and the chair-cushion painted in bright vermillion to accent the man's cloak and to contrast the rest of the image, drawing the viewer's eyes to the room, with the change in tone similarly represented by the change in tiles to a black-and-white checkerboard pattern.

== Repainting ==
Originally, the painting included the figure of another man near to the entrance of the back room which has since been painted out. An 1827 sale mentions a man with a black cloak, likely the aforementioned painted-out figure. Additionally, analysis suggests the dog in the foreground was later repainted in a different fashion. Despite this, it is undoubted by collectors as a genuine de Hooch, ruling out the possibility of this painting's creation belonging to Abraham Janssens as may have been first believed.

== Associated artworks ==
The hallway's of the Amsterdam Town Hall, including the featured South hallway feature marble statues. The relief at the back is a depiction of Mercury by the hand of Artus Quellinus the Elder, and the circular tiles where the couple stand is 'Peace', an atlas-style depiction of Earth.

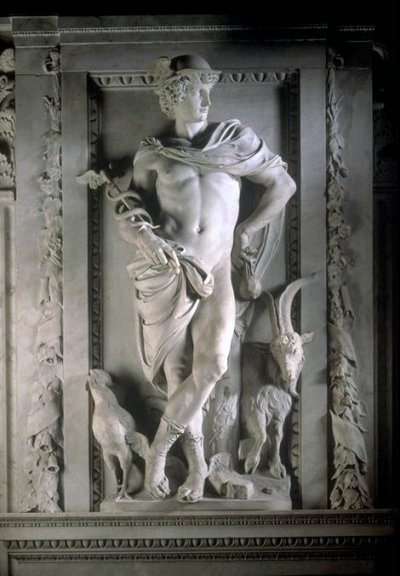
Mercury as depicted by Artus Quellinus the Elder

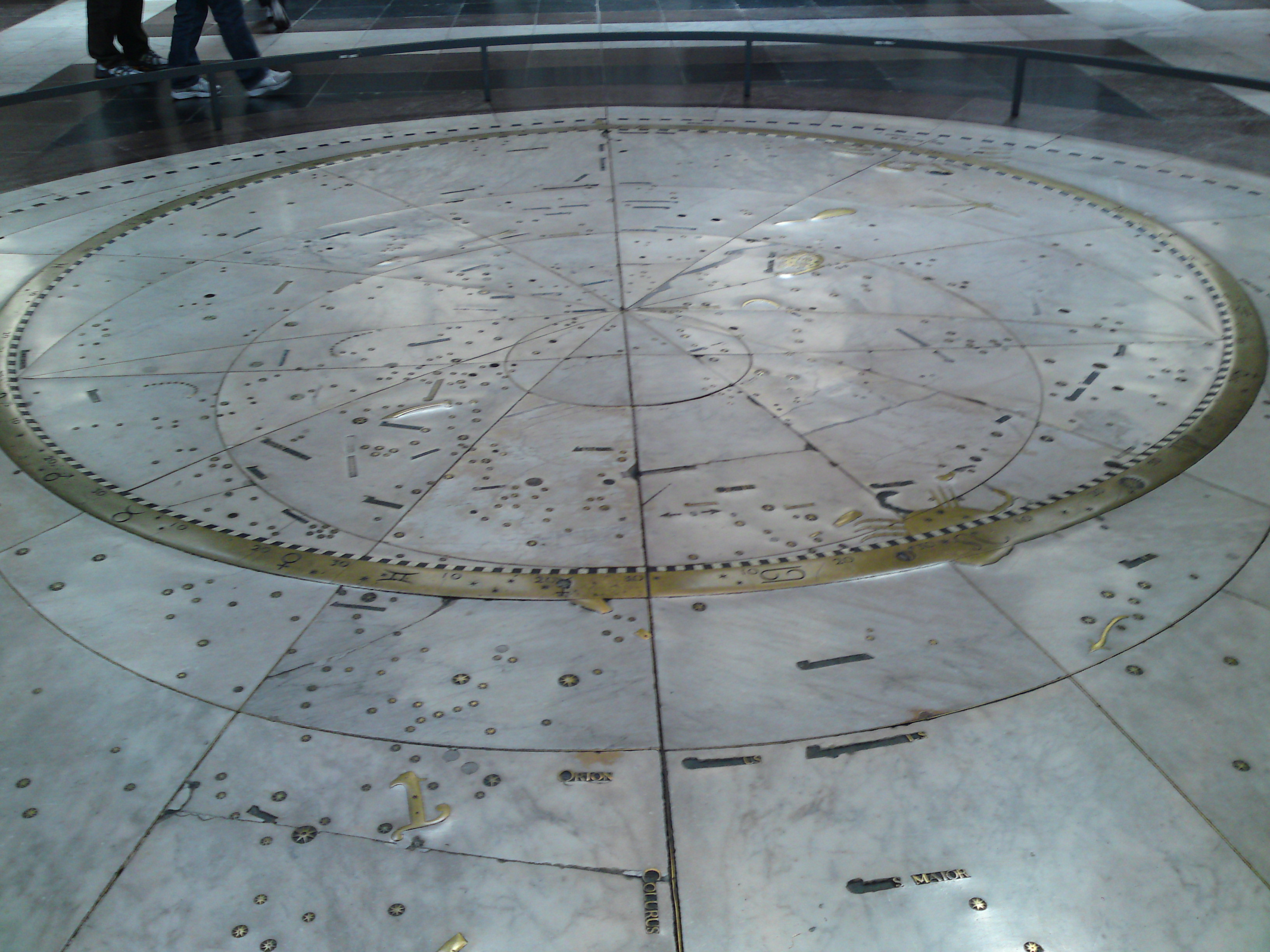
Hemelkaart (Sky map) of Earth in the Burgerzaal (Civic hall) of the building

De Hooch also made at least two more paintings with scenes of the interior of the City Hall, one featuring a classic Dutch Golden Age motif in the form of a curtain covering a portion of the image.

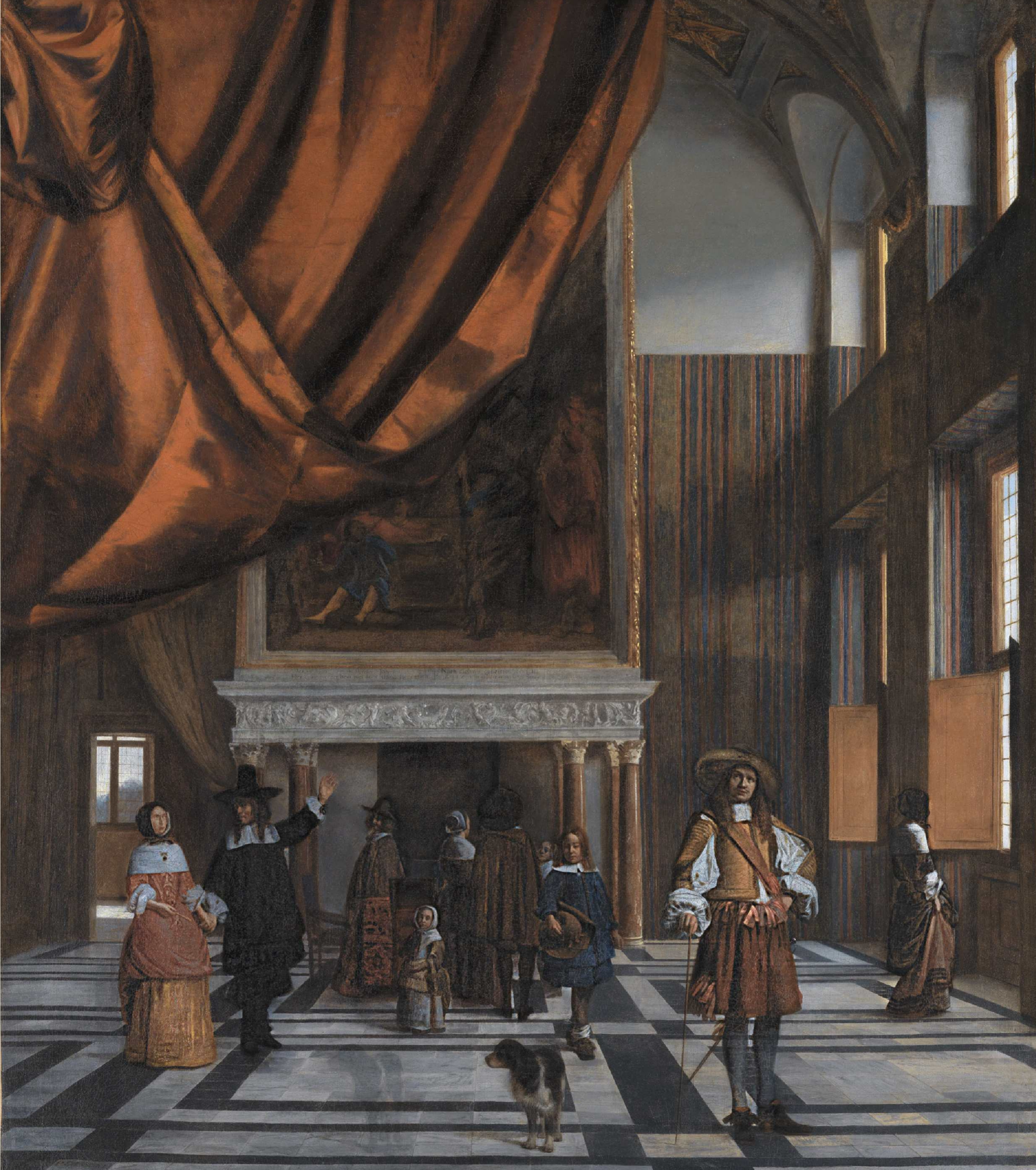
The Council Chamber in Amsterdam Town Hall

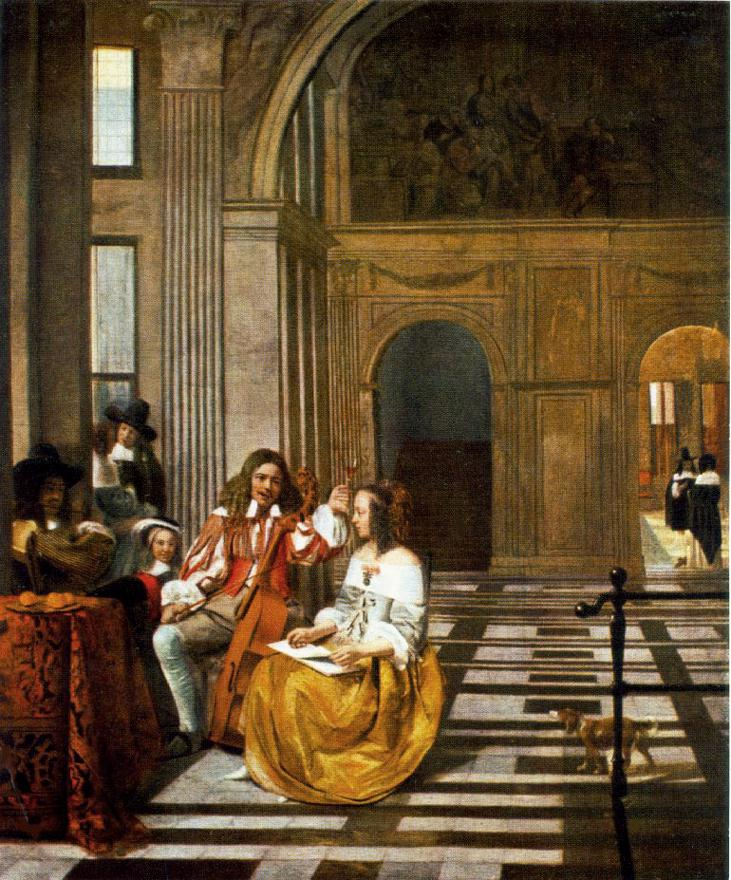
Musical Party in a Hall

== Provenance ==
The painting was first sold by H. Reydon in Amsterdam in April 1827. It is noted as in the collection of Howard Galton, Hadzor House, Droitwich, circa. 1850-1857. The last sale was from the possession of the dealer Edouard Warneck to Wilhelm von Bode for the Strasbourg Museum of Fine Arts where it resides today.

== See also ==
- List of paintings by Pieter de Hooch
