= Peter Flinsch =

Canadian artist (1920–2010)

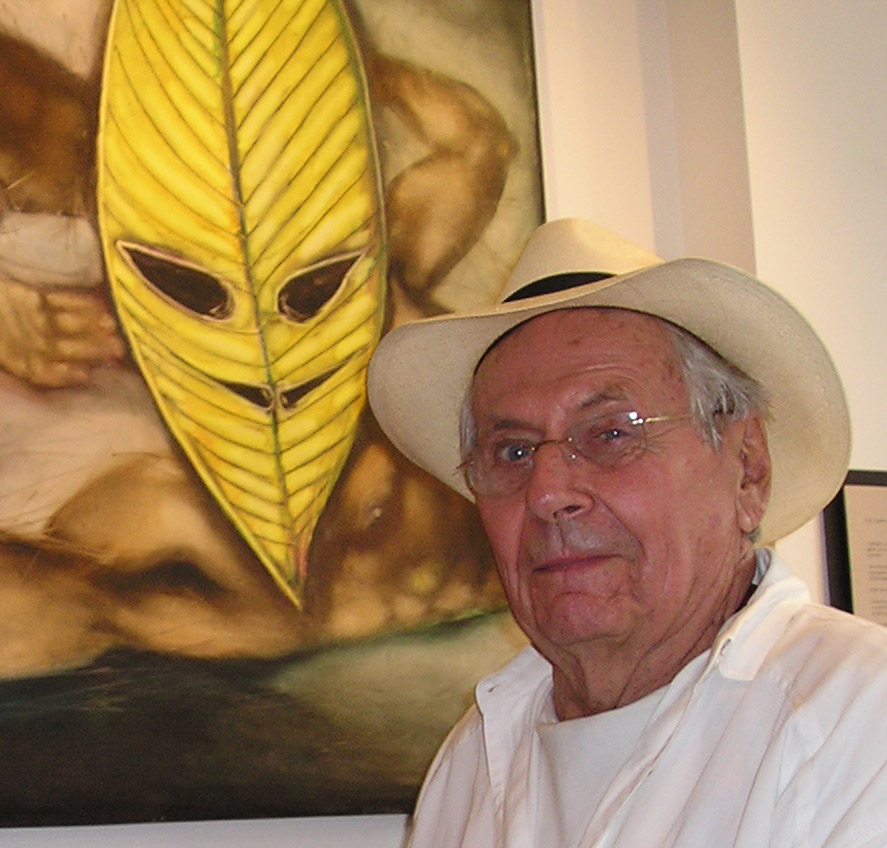
Peter Flinsch at the Galerie Dentaire in Montreal.

Peter Flinsch (April 22, 1920 – March 30, 2010) was a German Canadian artist, who worked as a set designer and art director for television programming produced by Radio-Canada the French language service of the Canadian Broadcasting Corporation.

He was born in Leipzig, Germany, the grandson of German art historian Ulrich Thieme. Flinsch, like many young Germans during the Nazi era, was obliged to join the Hitler Youth. At the onset of the Second World War he decided to fulfill his military obligation and joined the anti-aircraft artillery of the Luftwaffe. In 1942, after a Christmas party, he was spotted kissing another man and was charged under section 175-1 of the Third Reich's criminal code. He was sentenced to a disciplinary minesweeping unit where being overworked, underfed, and mistreated by fellow convicts he developed malaria.

At the end of the war in 1945, Flinsch began working as a theatre designer in Leipzig and Berlin and later as a publicity designer for Air France in Munich.

He subsequently moved to Vancouver in 1953, reuniting with his friend and lover Heino Heiden who was then the artistic director and choreographer for the Vancouver Ballet Company. He finally settled in Montreal to work for Radio-Canada, where he worked for over 30 years and won an Anik Award for Best Television Design in 1981 for his work on L'Espion aux yeux verts. Following his retirement from Radio-Canada in 1985, he began to exhibit his own artwork in drawing, painting, and sculpture.

In 1992, during the rebranding of CBC, he appeared in the Day After Day/Jour Apres Jour video for sign on and sign offs for CBC affiliates which appeared on screens as early as 1993.

In 1998, one of his friends suggested that he display his art on the Internet. Initially he resisted the idea. With much persuasion, his web presence was born. Eventually he enjoyed being contacted from complete strangers who were interested in his work, or the story of his life.

His web site also brought him into contact with an old lover from Paris in the 1940s, and a distant relative (see: Flinsch Peak).

The Body in Question, a biography by Ross Higgins which includes 110 pages of Flinsch's artwork, was published in 2008 by Arsenal Pulp Press.

He won the first Lifetime Achievement Award in 2006 from the Leslie/Lohman Gay Art Foundation.

He died in Montreal, Quebec on March 30, 2010.
