= The Council Chamber in Amsterdam Town Hall =

Painting by Pieter de Hooch

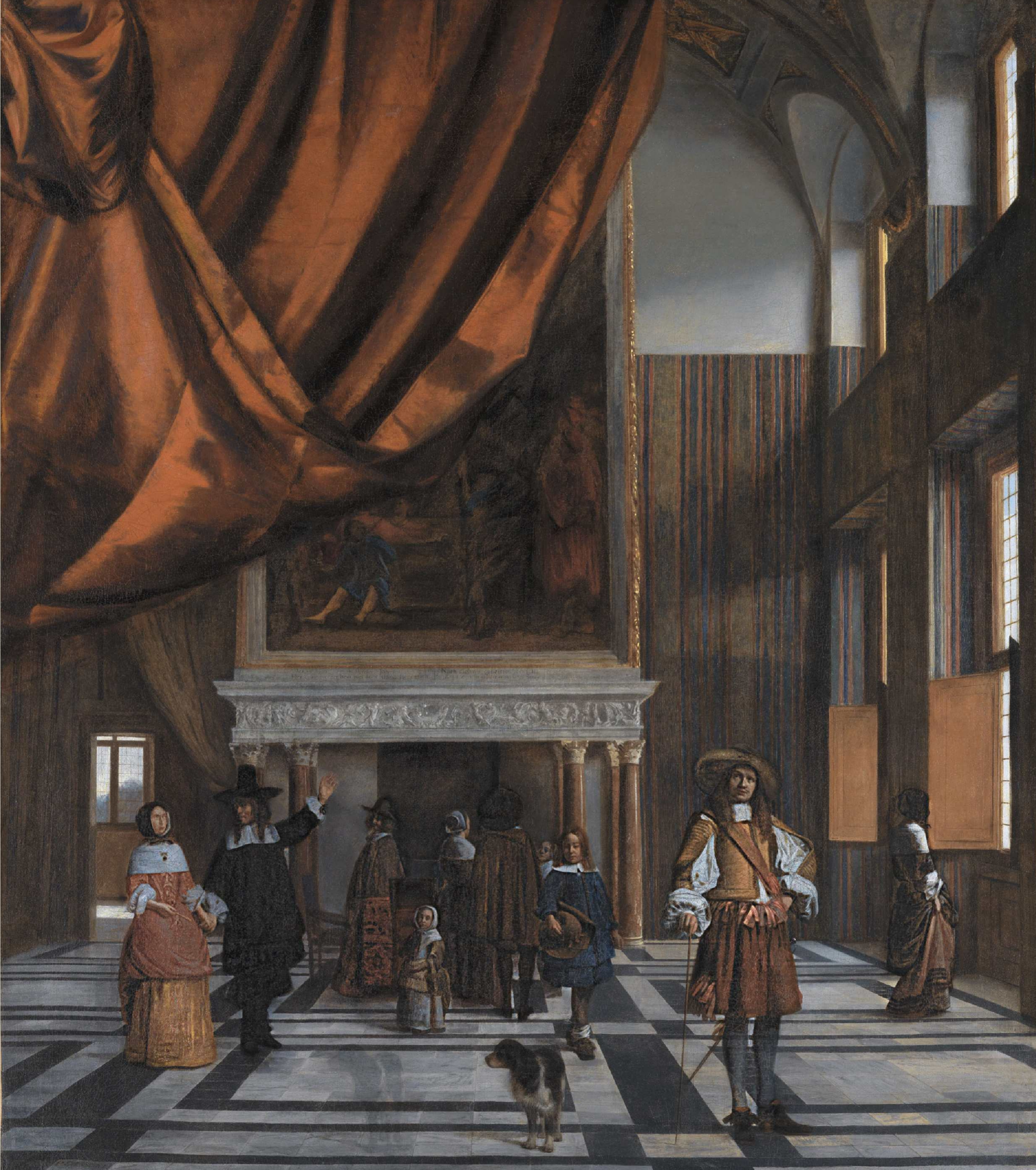
- Artist: Pieter de Hooch
- Year: c. 1663–1665
- Medium: oil on canvas
- Dimensions: 112.5 cm × 99 cm (44.3 in × 39 in)
- Location: Thyssen-Bornemisza Museum; Madrid

The Council Chamber in Amsterdam Town Hall (c. 1663–1665) is an oil-on-canvas painting by the Dutch Golden Age painter Pieter de Hooch. It is held in the Thyssen-Bornemisza Museum, in Madrid.

The painting was documented by Hofstede de Groot in 1908, who wrote:

180. THE BURGOMASTER'S ROOM IN THE AMSTERDAM TOWN HALL WITH A LARGE PARTY. In the middle of a room is a chimney-piece, with a cornice and frieze, supported on pilasters; a large picture hangs above. To the right are windows in double bays. To the left is seen a second room with a window. A couple enter from the left; the lady is dressed in red and yellow, the gentleman in black. The gentleman points with an admiring expression to the roof. In the right foreground is another gentleman, also looking upward; he is dressed in brown and yellow, with slashed sleeves, and carries a stick. A dog is beside him to the left. A lady, seen in profile, looks out of the window to the right. Around a table before the chimney-piece are grouped six persons, of whom a boy and a little girl face the spectator. High up on the left hangs a large reddish-brown curtain; the floor is paved with black and white tiles. The wall on the right is covered almost to the ceiling with a striped material. The picture over the chimney-piece is the story of Fabricius and Pyrrhus, by F. Bol; below it are the four well-known verses by Vondel. This shows that the scene depicted is the Burgomaster's room in the Amsterdam Town Hall. The dog in the foreground was first placed to the left instead of to the right of the centre. The picture is dark in tone, but still very good. Canvas, 41 inches by 30 inches. Now in the Von Stackelberg collection, in Faehna, Esthonia.

The Burgomaster's Room described here is one of two mayors' rooms on the Dam Square side of the Royal Palace of Amsterdam (the former city hall). The painting shows a chimneypiece in the larger of these two rooms. At the back in the left doorway is a fantasized version of the doorway to the adjoining mayors' room that in fact overlooks the tribunal, not the outdoors. Today a carpet covers most of the marble floor.

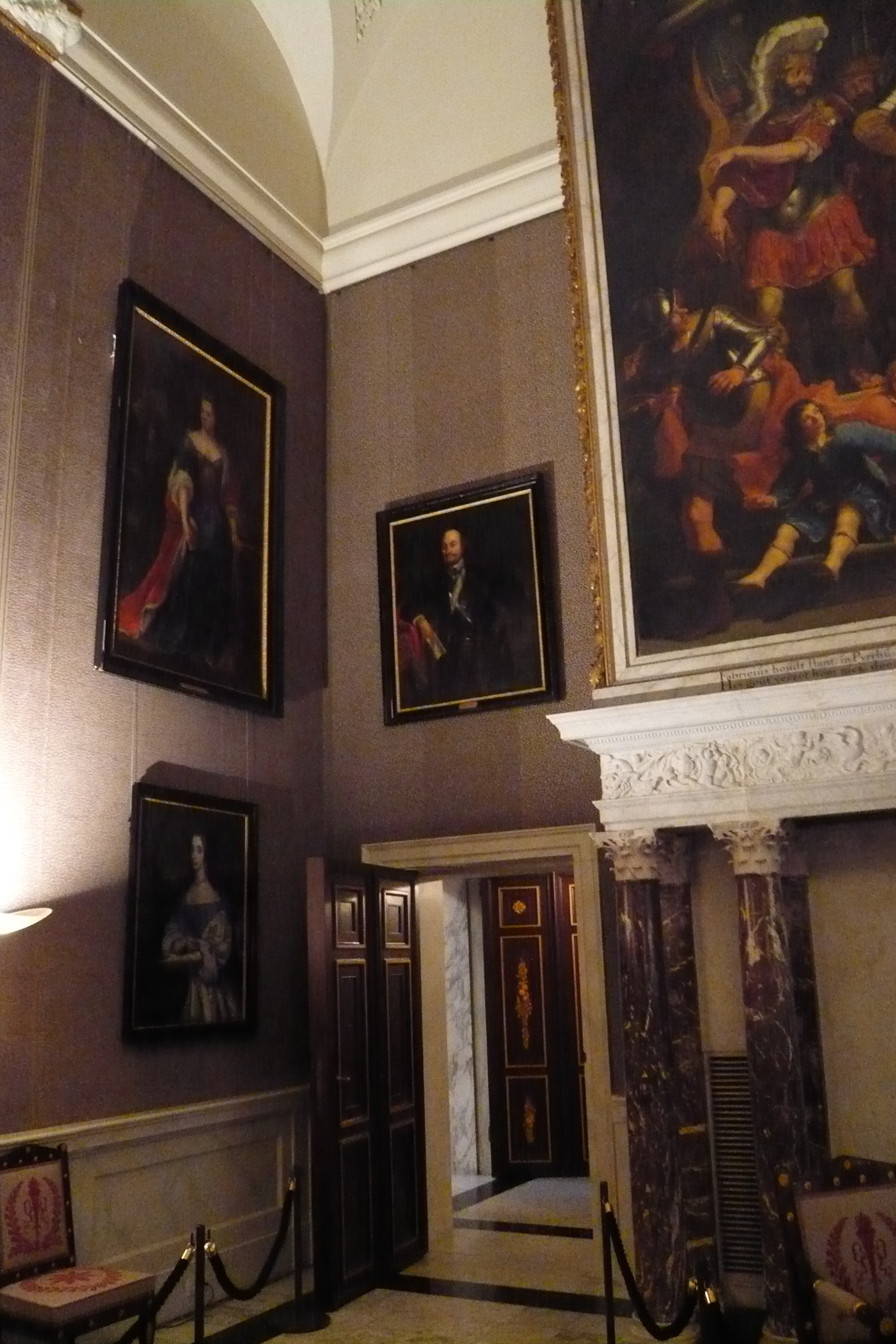
View of the mayors' room with the doorway to the adjoining mayors' room and the left-hand side of the hearth depicted in the painting

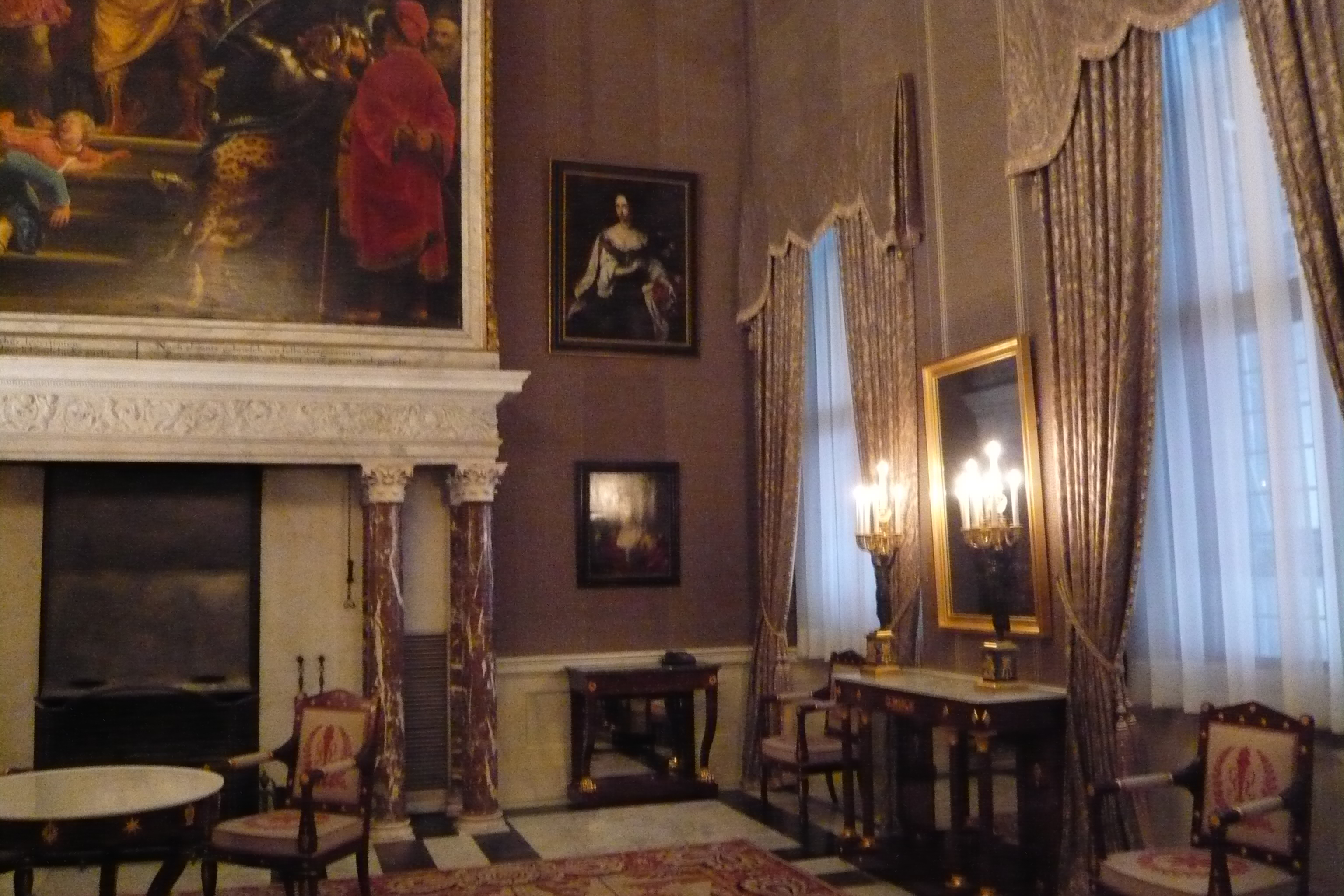
View of the mayors' room with the right-hand side of the hearth depicted in the painting

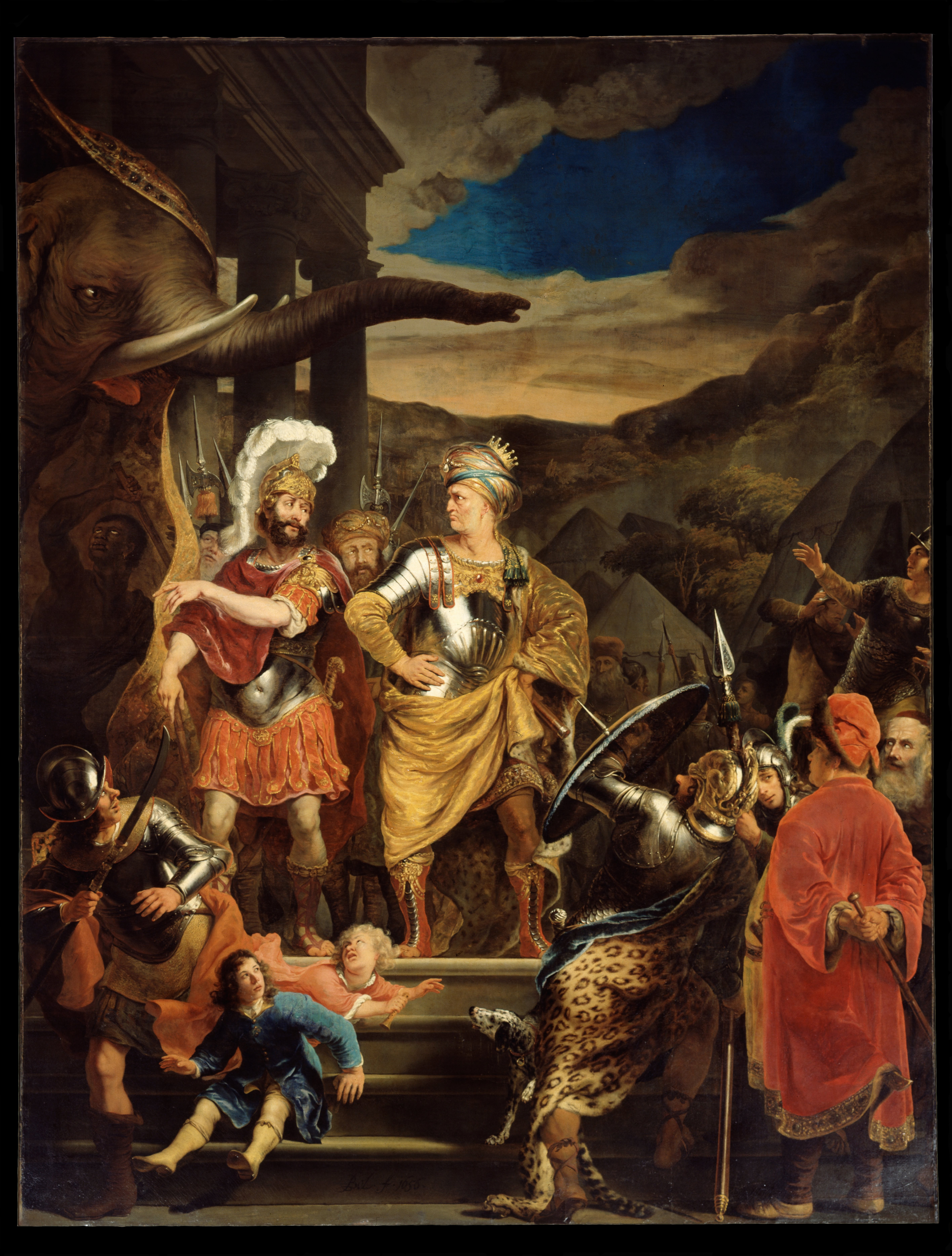
Fabritius and Pyrrhus, Ferdinand Bol

De Hooch made several paintings with scenes of the interior of the City Hall:

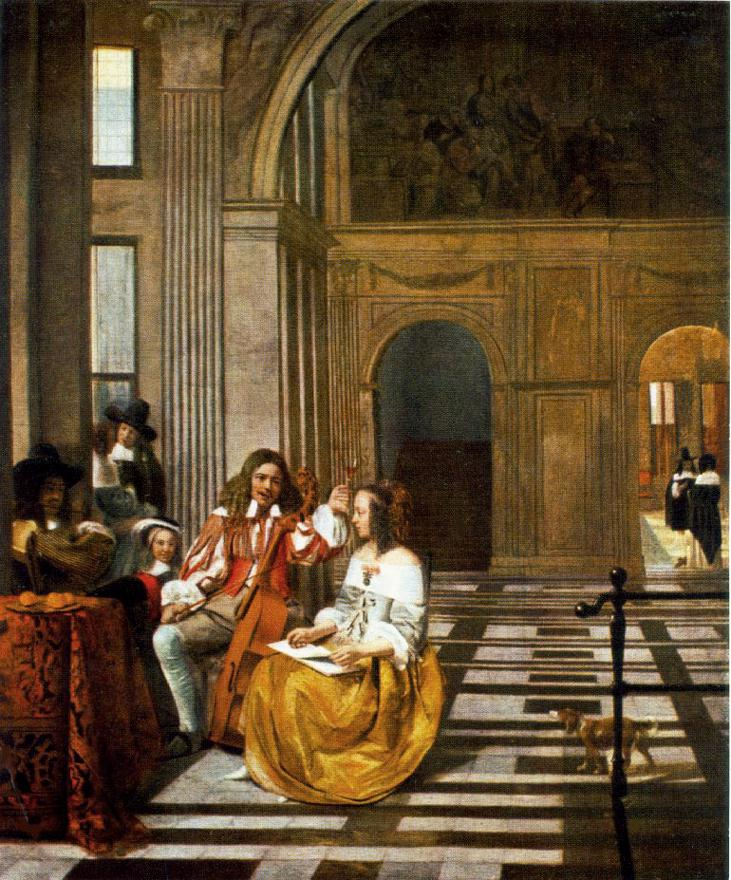
Musical Party in a Hall

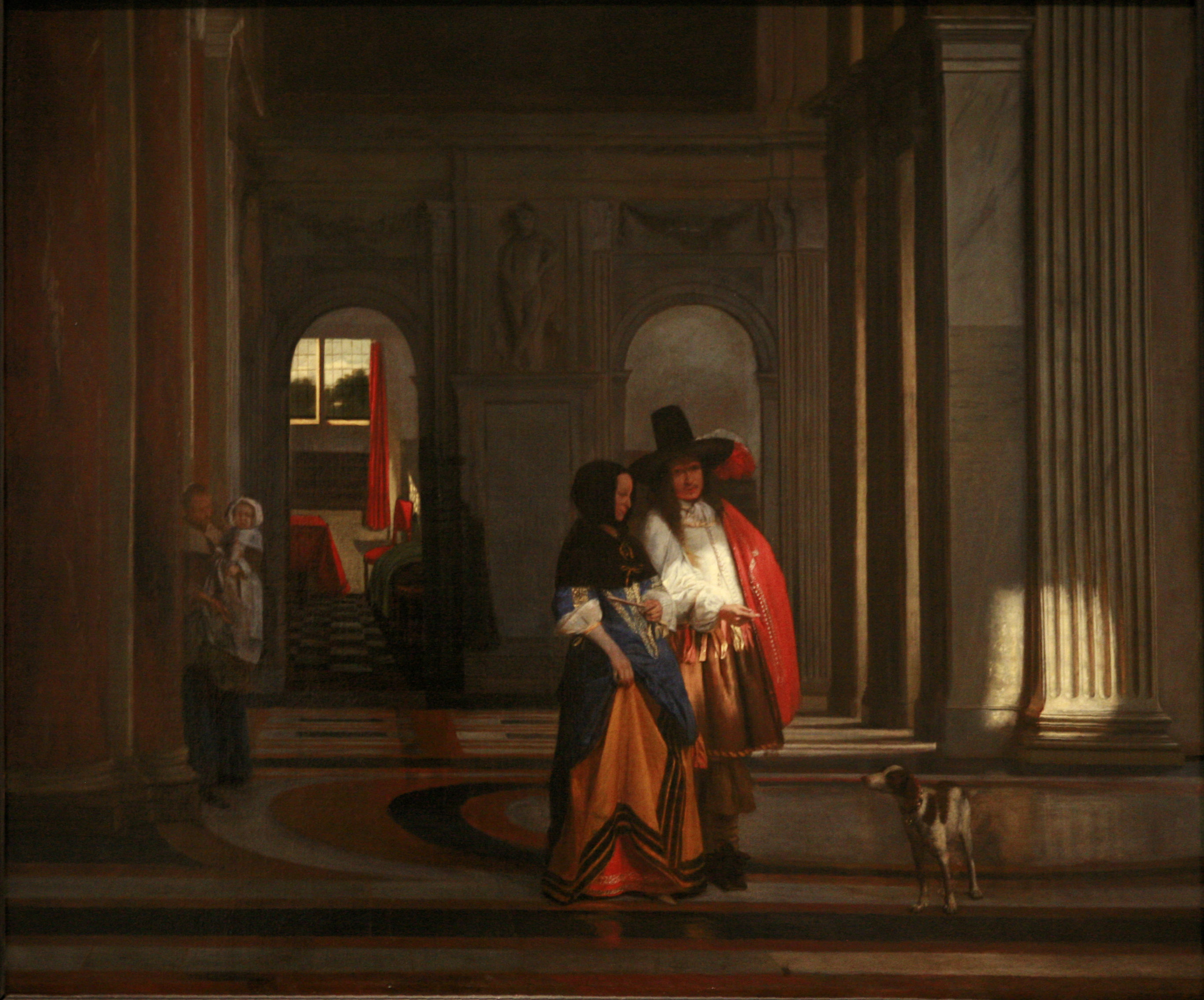
Going for a Walk in the Amsterdam Town Hall

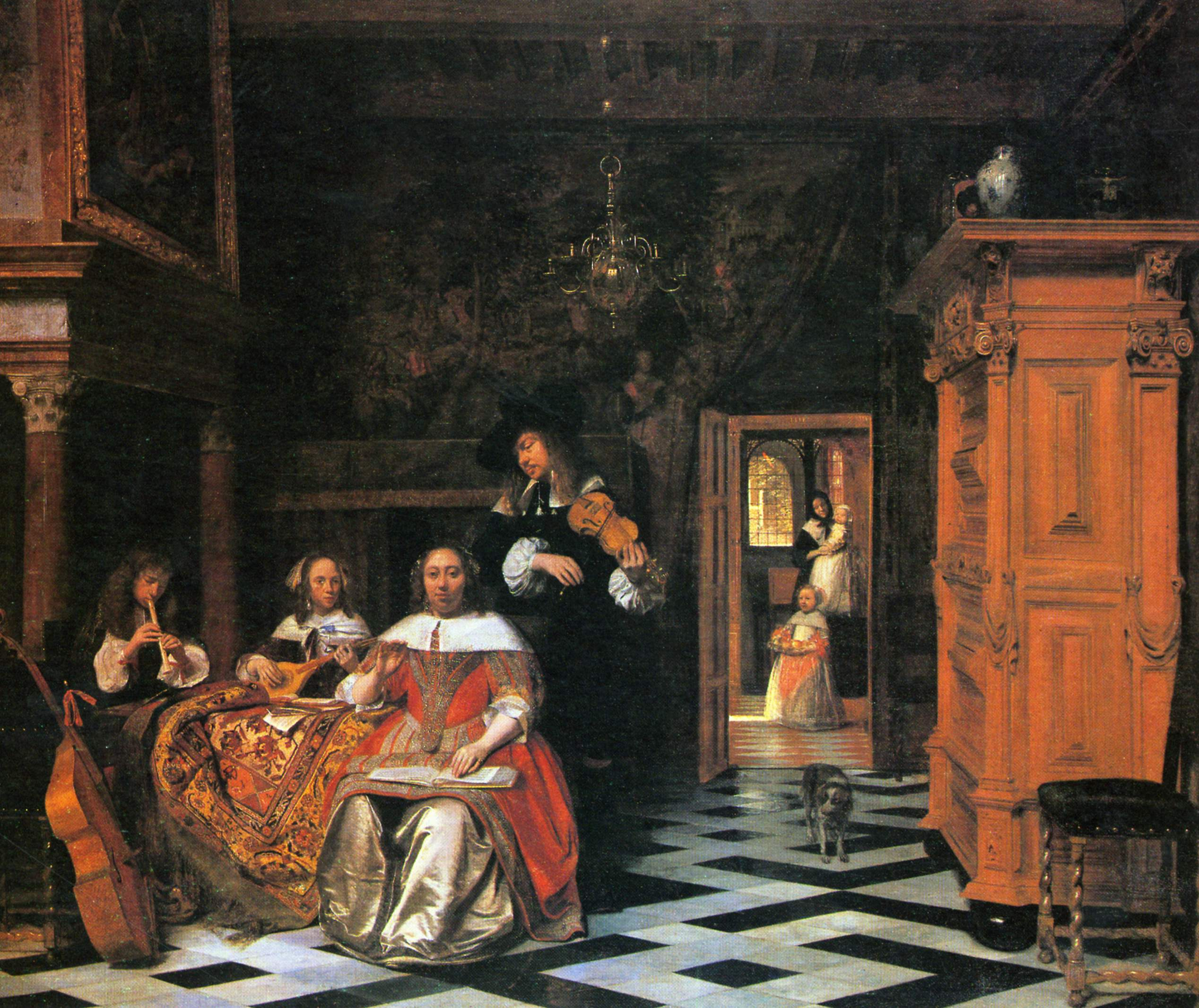
Portrait of a family playing music, though not situated in the City Hall, shows the same sculpted hearth on the left

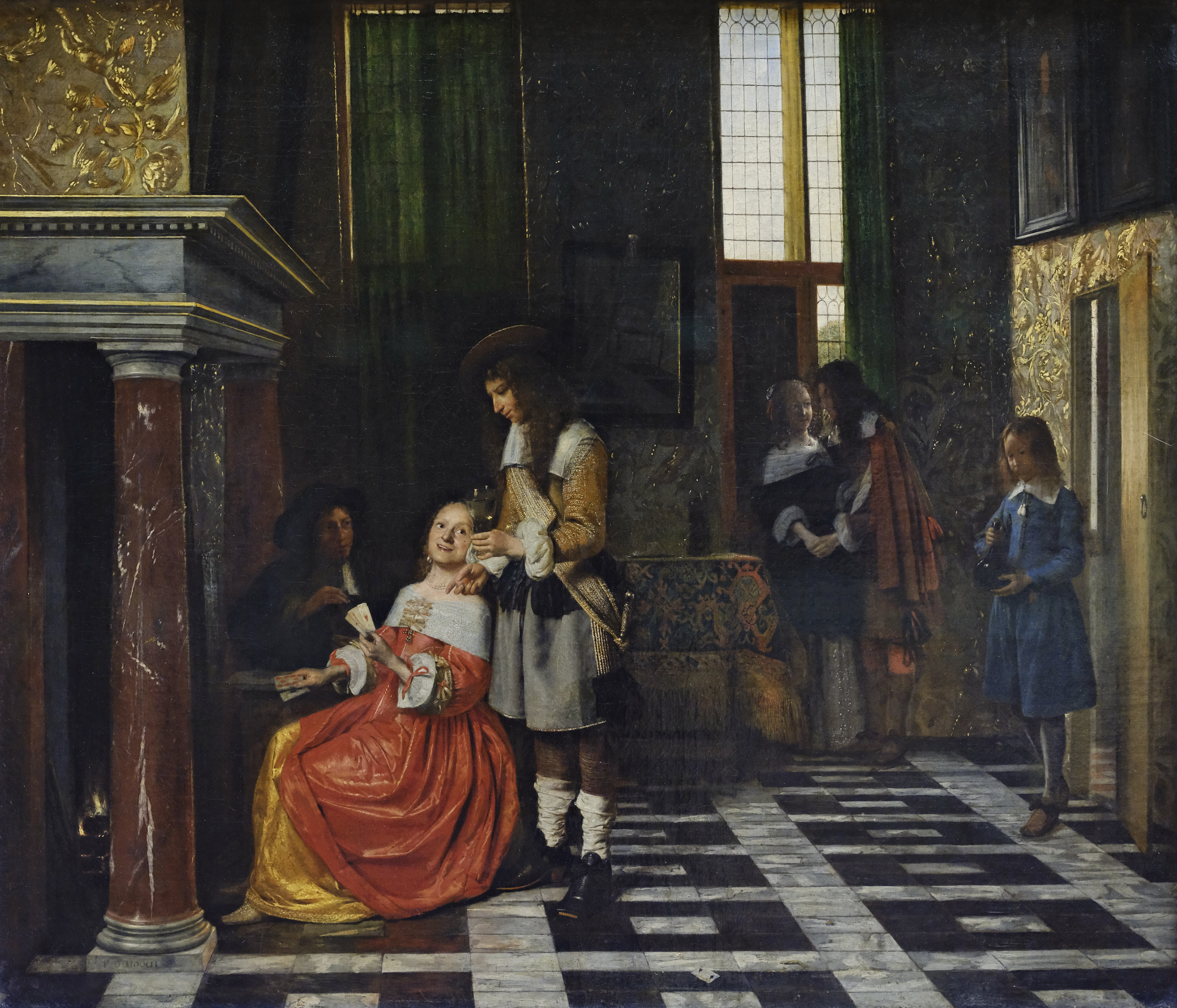
Card Players in an Opulent Interior, shows the hearth on the left and the windows, but has been given a wall on the right (in fact the Mayors-room has two hearths facing each other)

== See also ==
- List of paintings by Pieter de Hooch
