= Deutsche Medizinische Wochenschrift =

- January 2006 cover
- Discipline: Medicine
- Language: German

Publication details
- History: 1875–present
- Publisher: Thieme Medical Publishers (Germany)
- Frequency: weekly

Standard abbreviations
- ISO 4: Dtsch. Med. Wochenschr.

Indexing
- ISSN: 0012-0472 (print); 1439-4413 (web)

Links
- Journal homepage

The Deutsche Medizinische Wochenschrift (German Medical Weekly) (DMW) is a German medical journal established in 1875 by Paul Albrecht Börner. In the 1980s it was ranked 10th in the world in terms of its impact factor, but in the succeeding two decades the journal lost much of its preeminence due largely to the declining importance of the German language in medical publications and the appearance of a large number of new medical journals in the English language.

The DMW is currently published by Georg Thieme Verlag and is an official publication of the Deutsche Gesellschaft für Innere Medizin and the Gesellschaft Deutscher Naturforscher und Ärzte. The editor in chief is Martin Middeke. According to the Journal Citation Reports, its 2008 impact factor is 0.625, ranking it 86 out of 107 in the category "General and Internal Medicine".
