= Synthesis (journal) =

- Discipline: Chemistry
- Language: English

Publication details
- History: 1969—
- Publisher: Thieme (Germany & United States)

Standard abbreviations
- ISO 4: Synthesis

Indexing
- ISSN: 0039-7881

Links
- Journal homepage

Synthesis is a scientific journal published from 1969 to the present day by Thieme. Its stated purpose is the "advancement of the science of synthetic chemistry".

From August 2006, selected articles are offered free of charge. The impact factor of this journal is 2.867 (2018).
