= Musical Party in a Hall =

Painting by Pieter de Hooch

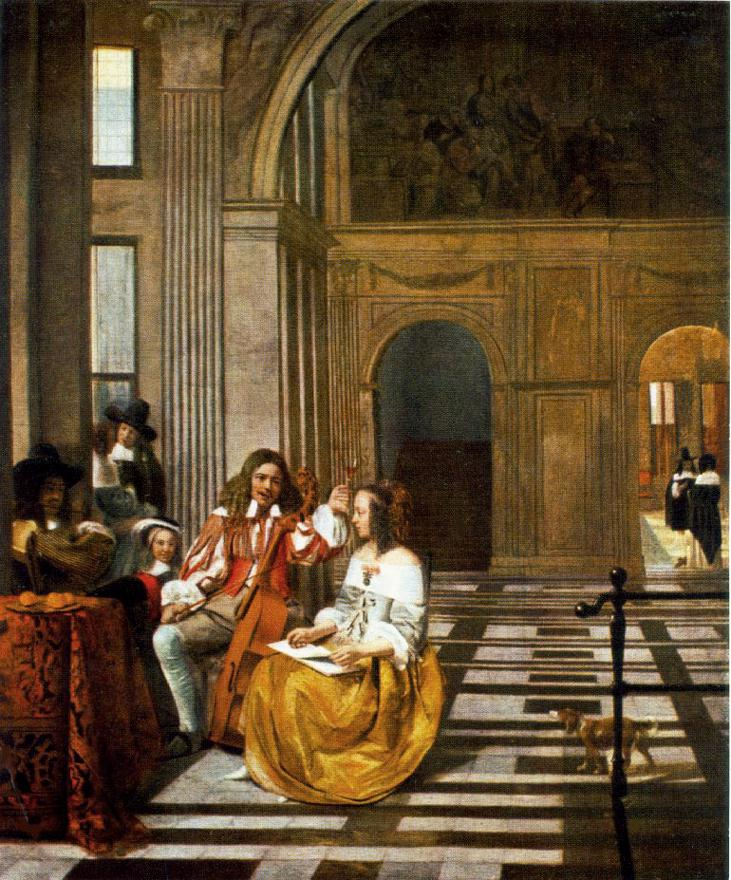
- Artist: Pieter de Hooch
- Year: c. 1663–1665
- Medium: oil on canvas
- Dimensions: 72 cm × 85 cm (28 in × 33 in)
- Location: Museum der bildenden Künste; Leipzig

Musical Party in a Hall (c. 1663–1665) is an oil-on-canvas painting by the Dutch painter Pieter de Hooch. It is an example of Dutch Golden Age painting and is now in the Museum der bildenden Künste, in Leipzig, Germany.

The painting was documented by Hofstede de Groot in 1908, who wrote:

126. THE MUSIC-PARTY. deG. 34. On the left in a large hall, the left-hand portion of which is represented, sit three persons at a table covered with an Ispahan carpet, upon which are some oranges. One gentleman plays the cello, another the flute, while a lady sings. The flute-player sits on the extreme left behind the table, wearing a slouch hat.

The cello-player sits to the right of the table, in full view of the spectator; he has long curls, and wears knee-breeches and a pink doublet with slashed sleeves over a white shirt with broad cuffs. He raises a glass with his left hand and holds his bow with his right. He looks at the lady sitting at his right; she has her music-book in her lap, and wears a greenish bodice and a yellow silk skirt. Between the two men is a boy, and behind him a couple. From the right comes a little dog. At the back of the hall a flight of stone steps goes up through a door. A second door on the right shows a well-lighted room, in which a young couple stand. Above these doors a copy of Raphael's School of Athens is let into the wall.

According to Dr. W. Bode, the picture dates from about 1662 to 1665. Its canvas is 32 inches by 27 inches. Described by Ch. Blanc, Le Tresor de la Curiosité, ii. 262.

Owners of the painting have included Pierre de Grand Pre, Paris, February 16, 1809 (bought for 2620 -francs, Paillet), James, London, 1892 (Thieme), and it is in the collection of the A. Thieme at Leipzig, No. 45 in the 1900 catalogue.

The large hall, the left-hand portion of the painting, is a gallery of the main hall of the (then) Amsterdam City Hall, today the Royal Palace of Amsterdam. The painting at the back is a fantasized version of the School of Athens by Raphael, but in reality another painting was installed. The gallery is possibly the one in the southeast corner near the registry office for weddings, as there are three couples represented. Possibly the doorway on the right is meant to be the registry office itself.

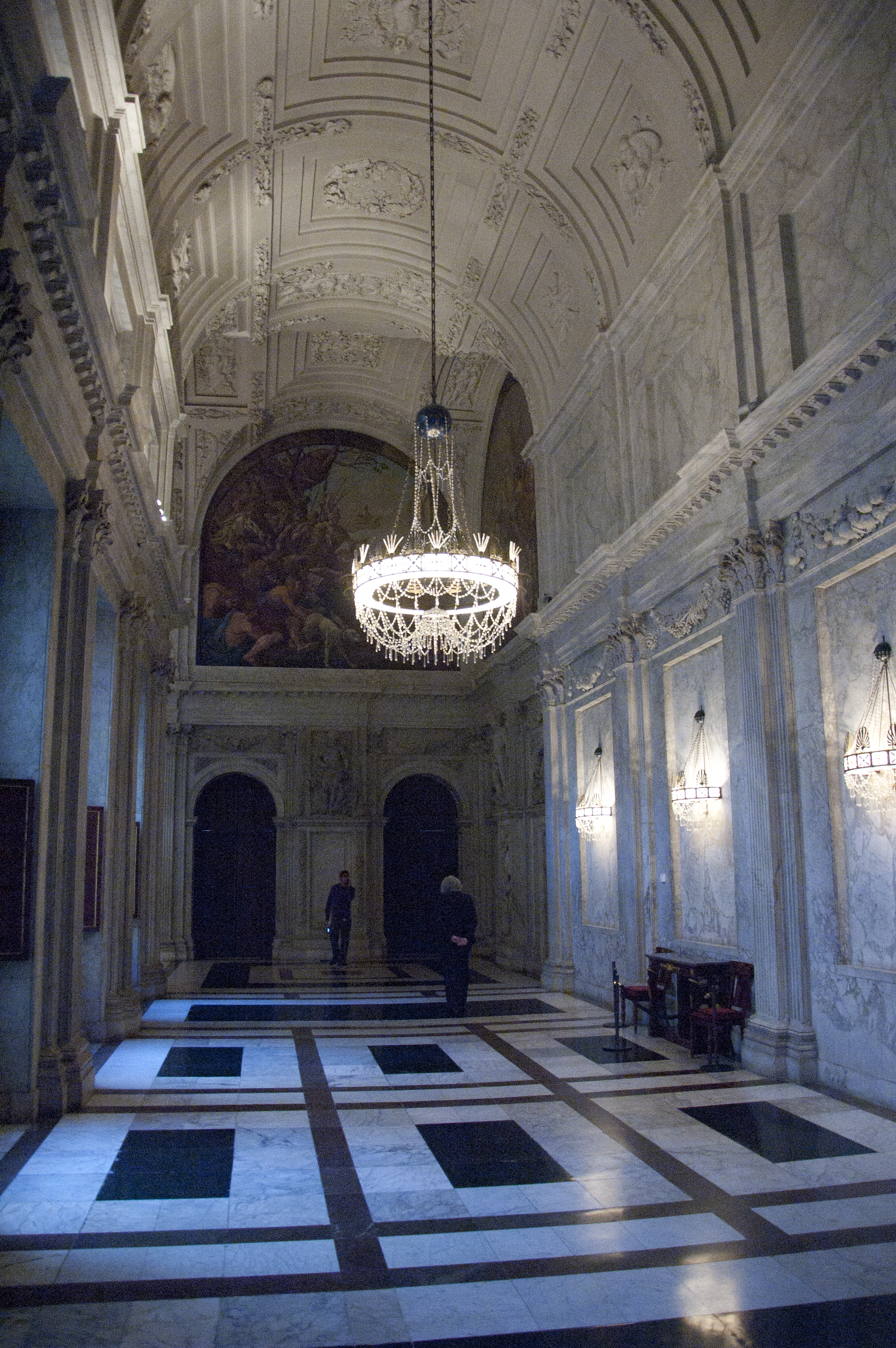
View of a gallery of the Royal Palace

De Hooch made at least two more paintings with scenes of the interior of the Amsterdam City Hall:

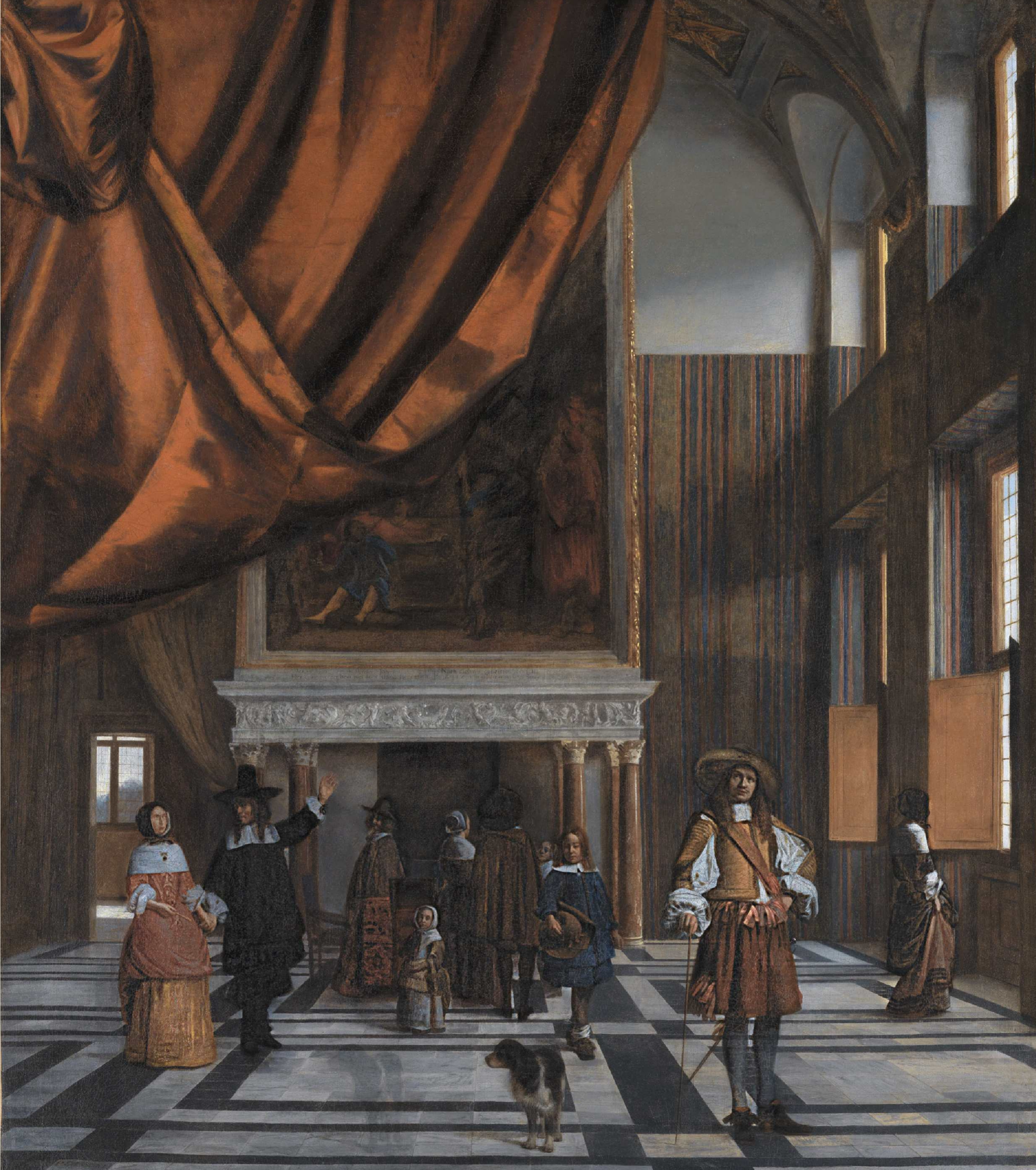
The Council Chamber in Amsterdam Town Hall

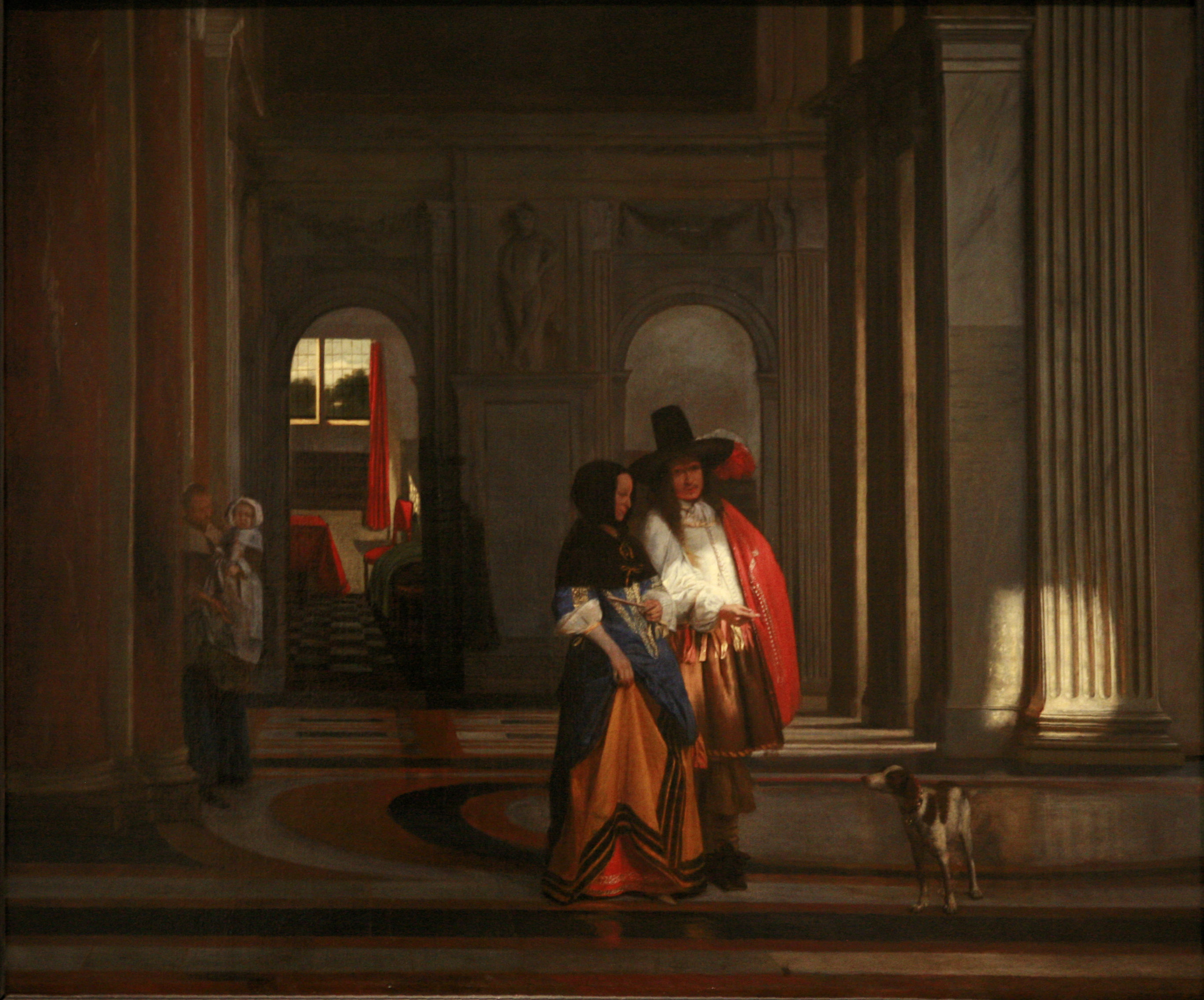
Going for a Walk in the Amsterdam Town Hall

== See also ==
- List of paintings by Pieter de Hooch
