= Alfred Thieme =

German industrialist and art collector

- Born: 2 May 1830; Leipzig
- Died: 2 April 1906 (aged 75); Leipzig

Alfred Thieme (1830 – 1906) was a German industrialist and art collector from Leipzig.

What little is known of his life was published in his art catalog, which was written by his son, the art historian Ulrich (known for Thieme-Becker) and the art historian Wilhelm von Bode. It was illustrated with engravings of artworks by Albert Krüger. He donated much of his collection, also known as the Thiemeschen Sammlung, to the Museum der bildenden Künste.

Thieme was also the father of Georg Thieme who founded a medical publishing business, today Thieme Medical Publishers.

== Biography ==
Alfred Thieme was the son of the Leipzig banker Conrad Friedrich August Thieme. He was a personally liable partner in the iron, sheet metal and beam wholesale company C. F. Weithas Nachfolger. From 1890 to 1896, Thieme served as president of the Chamber of Commerce in Leipzig. He was considered one of the wealthiest men in Saxony. Between 1874 and 1876, he commissioned the Leipzig architect Arwed Rossbach to design a representative villa with outbuildings on the section of Weststraße that was removed after 1945. In 1886, he donated 66 Dutch paintings from his collection to the Museum of Fine Arts, Leipzig. A second, even more valuable collection that he assembled was acquired by the Leipzig museum in 1916. From 1891 to 1901, he was a royal appointee to the First Chamber of the Saxon Landtag.

== Art collection ==
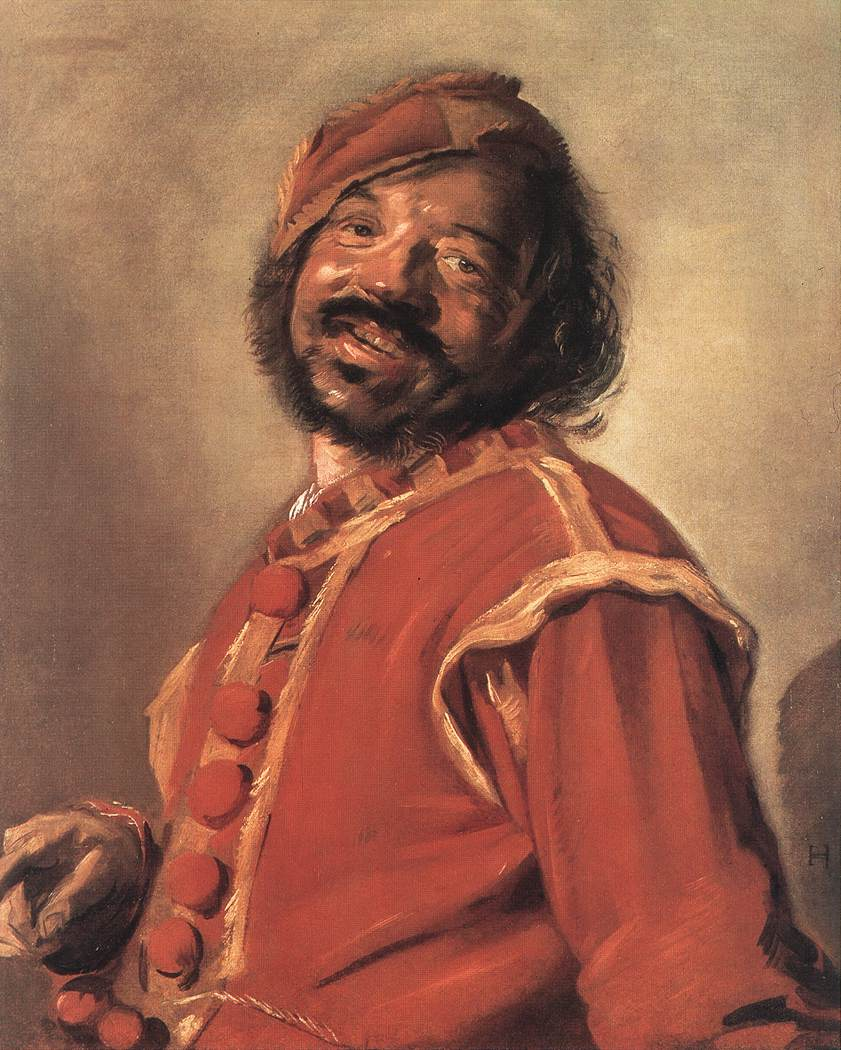
The Mulatto, by Frans Hals

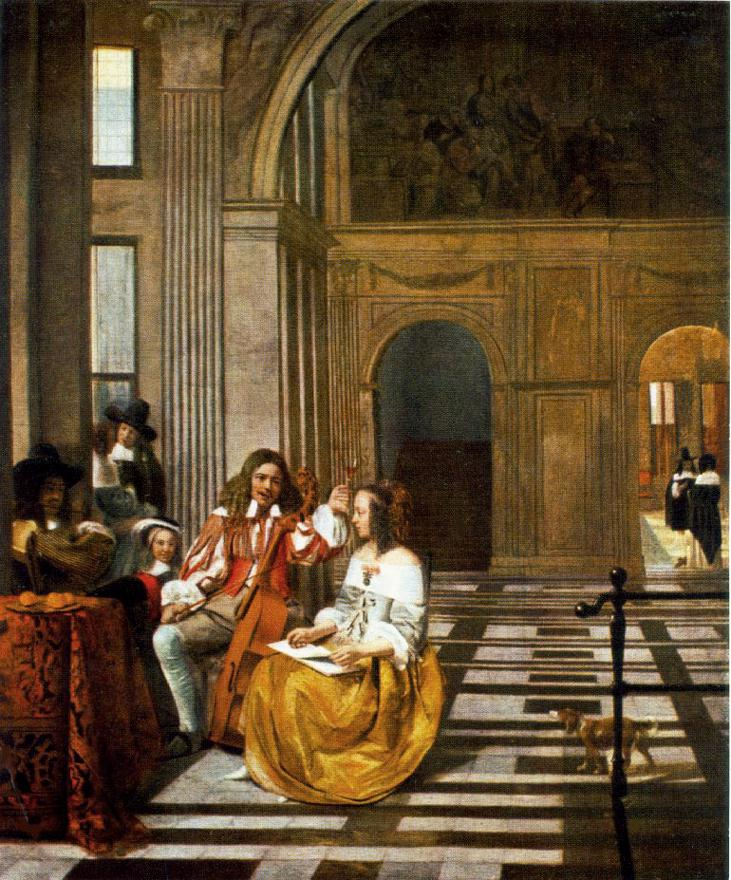
Musical Party in a Hall, by Pieter de Hooch
