= Thieme Medical Publishers =

German medical and science publisher in the Thieme Publishing Group

- Founded: 1886
- Founder: Georg Thieme
- Country of origin: Germany
- Headquarters location: Stuttgart
- Distribution: self-distributed (the Americas, India); Mare Nostrum (UK); Human Kinetics (Australia); LIDEL (Portugal)
- Key people: Albrecht Hauff, Publisher
- Publication types: Books, academic journals
- Nonfiction topics: science and medicine
- Official website: www.thieme.com

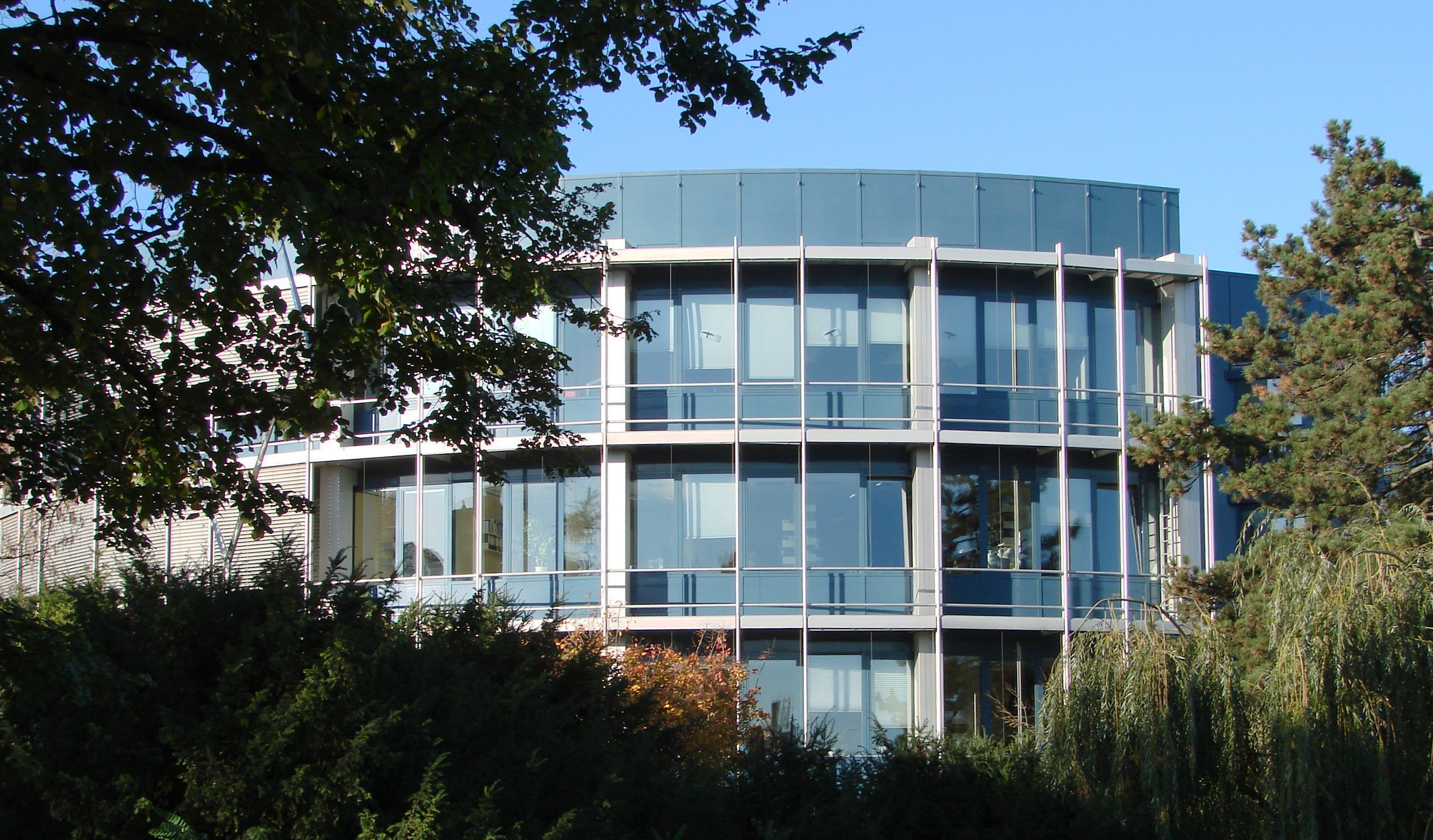

Thieme Medical Publishers is a German medical and science publisher in the Thieme Publishing Group. It produces professional journals, textbooks, atlases, monographs and reference books in both German and English covering a variety of medical specialties, including neurosurgery, orthopaedics, endocrinology, urology, radiology, anatomy, chemistry, otolaryngology, ophthalmology, audiology and speech-language pathology, complementary and alternative medicine. Thieme has more than 1,000 employees and maintains offices in seven cities worldwide, including New York City, Beijing, Delhi, Stuttgart, and three other cities in Germany.

== History ==
Georg Thieme Verlag was founded in 1886 in Leipzig, Germany, by Georg Thieme when he was 26 years old. Thieme remains privately held and family-owned. The company received some early success in 1896 by publishing Wilhelm Röntgen's famous picture of his wife's hand in what is still one of Thieme's and Germany's oldest journals, the Deutsche Medizinische Wochenschrift. In 1919, Georg Thieme partnered with Bruno Hauff, a young publisher from Leipzig. When Thieme died in 1925, ownership of the company passed to Hauff. Members of the Hauff family have been the proprietors of the business ever since.

In 1946, two years after Thieme had been bombed and forced to close completely during World War II, the Allies relocated the company from Leipzig in the eastern sector to Stuttgart in the west where it was provided with a license to publish and distribute journals, brochures, and books.

Guenther Hauff, son of Bruno, acquired Stratton International Medical Book of New York in 1979, and several years later, in 1984, the two companies merged to become Thieme Medical Publishers New York.
